= List of multiple-barrel firearms =

Below is a list of multiple-barrel firearms of all forms from around the world.

== Pistols ==
Name	Manufacturer	Image	Cartridge	Country	Year
Arsenal Firearms AF2011A1	Arsenal Firearms		.38 Super.45 ACP	Italy	2011
Baylè 1879 wallet / palm pistol				FR	1879
Chiappa M6 survival gun	Chiappa Firearms		12 gauge.22 LR	Italy	2010
COP .357 Derringer			.38 Special.357 Magnum	US	1983
Double-Barreled Wheellock Pistol Made for Emperor Charles V	Peter Peck		.46	GER	1540
DoubleTap derringer	DoubleTap Defense, LLC		9×19mm Parabellum.45 ACP	US	2012
Garrucha (pistol)			.32 S&W.38 S&W.22 Short.22 Long.22 Long Rifle	Brazil	1930s
Howdah pistol			.577 Snider.455 Webley.476 Enfield	UK	1800s-1900s
Heckler & Koch P11	Heckler & Koch		7.62×36mm	West Germany	1977
HDH revolver	Henrion, Dassy & Heuschen		.25 ACP.32 ACP; 6.5 Velodog	BEL; FR	1911
Ideal Conceal	Ideal Conceal, Inc.		.380 ACP; 9×19mm Parabellum	US	2018
Lancaster pistol			.577 inch.450 Adams.455 Webley	UK	1800s-1900s
LeMat Revolver	London Armoury Company		.36.42	US; FR	1855
M6 aircrew survival weapon	Ithaca Gun Company		.22 Hornet.410 bore	US	1952
Mossberg Brownie	O.F. Mossberg & Sons		.22 LR.22 Short	US	1919
Mk 1 Underwater Defense Gun			Mark 59 Mod 0 Projectile	US	1970
MSP Groza silent pistol	Tula Arms Plant		7.62×38 SP-3	Soviet Union	1972
Pepper-box					1700s-1800s
Pistola con caricato			6.35×15 mmSR	Italy; Spain	1900
Remington Zig-Zag Derringer	E. Remington and Sons		.22 short	US	1861
Remington Model 95	Remington Arms		.41 Short	US	1866
S4M	Tula KBP		7.62×63mm	Soviet Union	1965
S333 Thunderstruck	Standard Manufacturing		.22 WMR	US	2019
Schüler Reform			.25 ACP	GER	1907
Sharps Deringer	Sharps		.22 short	US	1859
SPP-1 underwater pistol	Tulsky Oruzheiny Zavod		4.5×40mmR	Soviet Union	1975
Springfield Armory M6 Scout			.22 LR.22 Hornet.410	US	
TKB-506	Tula Arms Plant		7.62mm SP-2	Soviet Union	1955
TP-82			5.45×39mm	Soviet Union	1986

== Rifles ==
Name	Manufacturer	Image	Cartridge	Country	Year
Nock gun	Henry Nock		.46 inches (12 mm)	UK	1779

== Flare launchers ==
Name	Manufacturer	Image	Cartridge	Country	Year
Nambu Type 90	Nambu Arms Manufacturing Company			Japan	1930

== Non-lethal ==
Name	Manufacturer	Image	Cartridge	Country	Year
Flash-ball	Verney-Carron		44×83mm	France	1995
MP-461			18×45 mm	Russia	2002
Osa			18×45 mm	Russia	1997

== Automatic rifles ==
Name	Manufacturer	Image	Cartridge	Country	Year
80.002			5.45×39mm 12.7mm grenade	Soviet Union	1975
AICW	Metal Storm		5.56×45mm 40mm grenade	AUS	2001
ru:АО-36	TsNIITochMash		5.6 13MZhV	Soviet Union	1965
AO-63 assault rifle	TsNIITochMash		5.45×39mm	Soviet Union	1984
FDM L4/L5			6mm	US	2018
H&R SPIW	Harrington y Richardson		5,6×57mm.17 Triplex; 40x46mm grenade	US	1951
S&T Daewoo K11	S&T Daewoo		5.56×45mm 20×30mm grenade	South Korea	2010
OICW-type T88/T98 "NK-11"			5.56×45mm 20×30mm grenade	Democratic People's Republic of Korea	2010
Fusil Automático Doble (FAD)	Peruvian arms		5.56×45mm 40x46mm grenade	Peru	2008
Knötgen automatic rifle			7.92×57mm	German Empire	1910
PAPOP	GIAT		5.56×45mm 35mm grenade	FR	1995
Springfield Armory SALVO	Springfield Armory		5.56×45mm	US	1957
TKB-059	Tula Arms Plant		7.62×39mm	Soviet Union	1962
QTS-11	Norinco		5.8×42mm	China	2011
XM29 OICW	Heckler & Koch; Alliant Techsystems		5.56×45mm	GER; US	1996

== Submachine guns ==
Name	Manufacturer	Image	Cartridge	Country	Year
Onorati SMG			9×19mm Parabellum	Italy	1936
Sturmpistole M.18 Steyr			9×23mm Steyr	Austrian Empire; Kingdom of Hungary	1917
Villar Perosa aircraft submachine gun			9mm Glisenti	Kingdom of Italy	1914

== Shotguns ==
Name	Manufacturer	Image	Cartridge	Country	Year
Beretta 682	Beretta		12-gauge	Italy	1984
Beretta DT-10	Beretta		12-gauge	Italy	2000
Beretta Silver Pigeon	Beretta		12-gauge 20-gauge 28-gauge.410 bore	Italy	1950s
Beretta Ultraleggero	Beretta		12-gauge	Italy	2021
Blaser F3	Blaser		12-gauge 20-gauge 28-gauge	GER	2004
Browning BSS	Browning Arms Company		12-gauge	US	1971
Browning Citori	Miroku Corporation		12-gauge 16-gauge 20-gauge 28-gauge.410 bore	Japan	1973
Browning Superposed	Browning Arms Company		12-gauge	US	1931
Chiappa Double Badger	Chiappa Firearms		.22 LR.410 bore	Italy	
Chiappa Triple Threat	Chiappa Firearms		12 Gauge	US	2013
Colt Defender Mark I			20-gauge	US	1967
Cynergy Shotgun	Browning Arms Company			US	2004
DP-12	Standard Manufacturing		12 gauge	US	2015
FN SC-1	FN Herstal			BEL	
Ithaca Auto & Burglar	Ithaca Gun Company		12 Gauge; 28-gauge	US	1922
IZh-12	Izhevsk Mechanical Plant		12-gauge 16-gauge	USSR	1962
IZh-27	Izhevsk Mechanical Plant		12-gauge 16-gauge 20-gauge	USSR	1969
IZh-43	Izhevsk Mechanical Plant		12-gauge 16-gauge.410 bore	USSR	1986
IZh-54	Izhevsk Mechanical Plant		12-gauge	USSR	1954
IZh-56	Izhevsk Mechanical Plant		28-gauge 22LR	USSR	1956
IZh-58	Izhevsk Mechanical Plant		12-gauge 16-gauge 20-gauge 28-gauge	USSR	1958
IZh-59	Izhevsk Mechanical Plant		12-gauge	USSR	1960
IZh-94	Izhevsk Mechanical Plant		12-gauge 20-gauge.410 bore	USSR	1993
M30 Luftwaffe drilling	Sauer & Sohn		12/65 gauge 9.3×74mmR	Nazi Germany	1941
Marble Game Getter	Marble Arms		.410 bore	US	1908
Mossberg Silver Reserve	Mossberg		12-gauge	US	2021
MTs 5	TsKIB SOO		16-gauge 20-gauge 28-gauge	USSR	1950
MTs 7	TsKIB SOO		12 gauge 20 gauge 7.62×54mmR; 9×53mmR	USSR	1950s
MTs 8	TsKIB SOO		12-gauge 20-gauge	USSR	1953
MTs 30	TsKIB SOO		12-gauge 9×53mmR	USSR	1958
MTs 109	TsKIB SOO		12-gauge 9×53mmR	USSR	1968
MTs 110	TsKIB SOO		12-gauge 20-gauge 7.62×51mm 9×53mmR	USSR	
MTs 111	TsKIB SOO		12/70mm 7.62×54mmR; 9×53mmR	USSR	1968
Remington Spartan 310	Izhevsk Mechanical Plant		12-gauge 20-gauge 28-gauge.410 bore	USSR	1972
Ruger Gold Label	Sturm, Ruger & Co.		12-gauge	US	2002
Ruger Red Label	Sturm, Ruger & Co.		12-gauge	US	1978
TOZ-28	Tula Arms Plant		20-gauge 7.62x38mmR; 6.5x38mmR	USSR	1964
TOZ-34	Tula Arms Plant		12-gauge 20-gauge 28-gauge	USSR	1964
TOZ-55	Tula Arms Plant		12-gauge	USSR	1975
TOZ-57	Tula Arms Plant		12-gauge	USSR	
TOZ-66	Tula Arms Plant		12-gauge	USSR	1968
TOZ-84	Tula Arms Plant		12-gauge 9×53mmR	USSR	1980
TOZ-250	Tula Arms Plant		.22 LR; 16-gauge	USSR	1960s
Savage Model 24	Savage Arms		.22 LR.410 bore	US	1938
Stevens Model 311	Stevens Arms		12-gauge	US	1920
Stoeger Coach Gun	E.R. Amantino		12-gauge	US	
Stoeger Condor	E.R. Amantino		12-gauge 16-gauge 20-gauge	Brazil	
Weatherby Orion	Weatherby		12-gauge	US	2014
Winchester Liberator	Winchester Repeating Arms Company		16 Gauge; 12 gauge	US	1962
Winchester Model 21	Winchester		12-gauge	US	1931 - 1959

== Machine guns ==
Name	Manufacturer	Image	Cartridge	Country	Year
421 RK	Oerlikon Contraves		42×338mm 42×347mm	Swiss	1958
AK-630	TsKIB SOO		30×165mm AO-18	Soviet Union	1963
Bailey machine gun	Winchester Repeating Arms Company		.32 rifle cartridge	US	1874
Billinghurst Requa Battery gun			.58 caliber	US	1861
Caldwell machine gun			.303 British	AUS	1915
General Electric CHAG (Compact High Performance Aerial Gun)	General Electric		30×173mm	US	1980s
General Electric CHAG 225	General Electric		25×137mm	US	1980s
Colt Mk 11 cannon	Colt's Manufacturing Company		20x110mm USN	US	1956
CS/LM5	Chongqing Jianshe Motorcycle		12.7×108mm.50 BMG	China	2008
CS/LM12			7.62×54mmR; 7.62×51mm NATO	China	2012
EX-17 Heligun	Hughes Aircraft Company		7.62x51mm NATO	US	1962
Feldl gun			11x50mmR	Kingdom of Bavaria	1867
Fokker-Leimberger	A.H.G. Fokker & Leimberger		7.92×57mm Mauser	German Empire	1916
Fyodorov–Shpagin Model 1922			6.5×50mmSR Arisaka	Soviet Union	1922
Gardner gun				US	1874
Gast gun			7.92×57mm Mauser	German Empire	1915
Gatling gun				US	1861
GAU-6	General Electric		.50 BMG; 10x108mm	US	1970
GAU-7/A Ford-Philco	Ford-Philco		25×152mm Brunswick caseless	US	1974
GAU-7/A General Electric	General Electric		25×152mm Hercules caseless	US	1971
GAU-8 Avenger	General Electric		30×173mm	US	1977
GAU-12 Equalizer	General Dynamics		25×137mm	US	1971
GAU-13	General Dynamics		30×173mm	US	1977
GAU-19	General Dynamics		.50 BMG	US	1983
GECAL 50	General Electric		.50 BMG	US	1982
it:GE 225	General Electric		25×137mm	US	1985
GE 325	General Electric		25×137mm	US	1980s
Gebauer 1918.M	Danuvia		8×50mmR Mannlicher	Hungary	1918
Gryazev-Shipunov GSh-23	KBP Instrument Design Bureau		23×115mm	Soviet Union	1965
Gryazev-Shipunov GSh-6-23	KBP Instrument Design Bureau		23×115mm	Soviet Union	1975
Gryazev-Shipunov GSh-6-30	KBP Instrument Design Bureau		30×165mm	Soviet Union	1975
Gryazev-Shipunov GSh-30-2	KBP Instrument Design Bureau		30×165mm	Soviet Union	1981
GShG-7.62 machine gun	KBP Instrument Design Bureau		7.62×54mmR	Soviet Union	1968
Hotchkiss Revolving Cannon	Hotchkiss et Cie			FR	1872
In-Line	AAI Corporation		7.62×51mm NATO	US	1969
Komodo Armament Eli gun	Komodo Armament		7.62×51mm NATO	IDN	2014
Kortik CIWS	KBP		30×165mm AO-18	Soviet Union	1989
M61 Vulcan	General Electric		20×102mm	US	1959
M134 Minigun	General Electric		7.62×51mm NATO	US	1960
M197 electric cannon	General Dynamics		20×102mm	US	1967
Meroka CIWS	FABA Sistemas / Navantia		20x118mm	Spain	1984
MG 29	W+F Bern		7.5×55mm Swiss	CH	1929
Mitrailleuse				FR	1851
Montigny mitrailleuse				BEL	1863
Moharram			12.7x108mm	Iran	2014
Nikonov machine gun	Izhmash		5.45×39mm	Soviet Union	1977
Nordenfelt gun				UK	1873
Oerlikon KBD	Oerlikon Contraves		25×184mm	Swiss	1988
Rheinmetall MG14Z	Tactics Group GmbH		7.62×51mm NATO	GER	2014
Rheinmetall RMG 7.62	Rheinmetall Defence		7.62×51mm NATO	GER	2013
Slostin machine gun	Degtyaryov Plant		7.62×54mmR; 14.5×114 mm	Soviet Union	1939
T250	Springfield Armory		37×219mmSR T68; 35×228 mm	US	1956
T220 Vulcan II	General Electric		30×113mmB; 30×126mmB	US	1957
TKB-666	KBP Instrument Design Bureau		7.62×54mmR	Soviet Union	1974
Twin Bren			7.62×39mm	China	1935
twin MG 81Z			7.92×57mm	Nazi Germany	1942
Type 89 machine gun			7.7×58mm Arisaka	Empire of Japan	1929
Type 100 machine gun			7.92×57mm	Empire of Japan	1940
Type 1130 CIWS			30×173mm	China	2015
Type 730 CIWS	713th Research Institute		30×173mm	China	2003
WLKM 12,7 mm	Zakłady Mechaniczne Tarnów		.50 BMG	Poland	
XM133 Minigun	General Electric		7.62×51mm NATO	US	1969
XM188	General Electric		30×100mmB WECOM	US	1966
XM214 Microgun	General Electric; General Dynamics		5.56×45mm	US	1966
XM301	General Dynamics		20×102mm	US	1992
Yak-B 12.7mm machine gun	KBP Instrument Design Bureau		12.7×108mm	Soviet Union	1973
ZPL-20	ZVI		20×102mm	Czechia	2004

== Grenade launchers ==
Name	Manufacturer	Image	Cartridge	Country	Year
DP-64	Degtyarev plant		45mm grenades	RUS	1990
STK SSW	ST Kinetics		5.7x28mm 40x46mm	SG	2004

== Rocket launcher ==
Name	Manufacturer	Image	Cartridge	Country	Year
Fliegerfaust	HASAG		20mm	Nazi Germany	1945
FHJ-84	Norinco		62mm	CHN	1980s
M202 FLASH	Northrop Corporation		66mm	US	1970
RPG-30	NPO Bazalt		105mm	RUS	2008

== See also ==
- Combination gun
- Double-barreled shotgun
- Lists of weapons
- List of firearms
- List of assault rifles
- List of machine guns
- List of pistols
- List of semi-automatic pistols
- List of revolvers
- List of sniper rifles
- List of grenade launchers
