= Type 90 =

Type 90 may refer to:

== Japanese weaponry ==
- Type 90 75 mm field gun, 1932–1945
- Type 90 240 mm railway gun 1930–1945
- Type 90 tank, from 1990
- Type 90 Ship-to-Ship Missile, from 1990
- 61 cm Type 90 torpedo, used during World War II
- Nambu Type 90, a flare gun 1930s–1940s
- Nakajima A2N or Navy Type 90 Carrier Fighter, a carrier-borne fighter of the 1930s

== Chinese weaponry ==
- Type 90 AFV, an armoured fighting vehicle
- Type-90 cluster munition, a submunition for cluster rockets
- Type 90-II and Type 90-IIM, versions of the Al-Khalid tank
- Type 90 submachine gun, Taiwanese prototype SMG
- Type 90, version of the Swiss Oerlikon GDF 35 mm twin cannon

== See also ==
- T-90, Russian main battle tank
