= Speedline =

Speedline may refer to:

- Speed line, artistic lines indicating speed and direction of travel
- PATCO Speedline, a rapid transit system
- Speedline Corse and Speedline Truck, brands of magnesium wheels produced by Ronal
- SPEEDLINE, the call sign for the former Airspeed Aviation; see Abbotsford International Airport
- SpeedLine, a rifle manufactured by Verney-Carron
