= Bailey machine gun =

Bailey Machine Gun
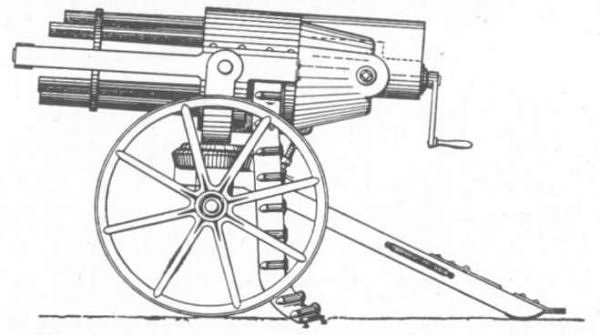
- Sketch of the Bailey Machine Gun, from the 1876 trials
- Type: Heavy Machine Gun
- Place of origin: United States

Service history
- Used by: United States

Production history
- Designer: Fortune L. Bailey
- Designed: 1874
- Manufacturer: Winchester Arms Co.

Specifications
- Cartridge: .32 rifle cartridge
- Rate of fire: 1,000 rounds per minute

The Bailey Machine Gun was a rapid-fire weapon developed in the late 19th century. It was a multiple barrel weapon similar to the much more commonly known Gatling gun and was the first weapon of this type to be belt-fed. Although commonly referred to as the Bailey Machine Gun, it is technically not a machine gun since it is externally powered using a hand crank. However, rapid-fire weapons of this type are commonly referred to as machine guns, even though this usage of the term is technically incorrect.

== History ==
The Bailey Machine Gun was designed in 1874 by Fortune L. Bailey of Indianapolis, Indiana. The initial design had some issues, but by 1875, a reliable working model had been produced by the Winchester Arms Company. This design was submitted to the U.S. Navy for evaluation.

In January 1876, Commodore T. H. Patterson of the Navy Yard in Washington, D. C. ordered trials for the new weapon. These trials began on February 11, 1876. It was noted that the weapon was small in comparison to similar weapons, which Bailey explained was due to the fact that the weapon had been designed around the .32 caliber rifle round for demonstration and proof of concept. Initial testing of the weapon had been so successful that Bailey had chosen to demonstrate the weapon as-is, rather than scale the technology up to a larger round.

The Navy Board found that Bailey had brought an insufficient number of ammunition belts for a thorough reliability and endurance test, and because of this, they refused to officially take the weapon under consideration. They did allow Bailey to fire off as many rounds as he desired for unofficial consideration, however. The ammunition belts that Bailey had provided held 100 rounds each, and a second belt could not be loaded after a burst of fire had been initiated. The sustained rate of fire was therefore found to be inadequate for Naval requirements. Bailey did manage to demonstrate a very high rate of fire, firing off a complete 100 round belt in 6 seconds for an official firing rate of 1,000 rounds per minute.

Commander Sicard, the officer in charge of the evaluation, wrote that "The test that was made for rapidity of fire was, however, truly astonishing. One hundred rounds being fired in about 6 seconds, the gun appearing to be almost in a continual blaze, the whole number ran off smoothly."

== Design and features ==
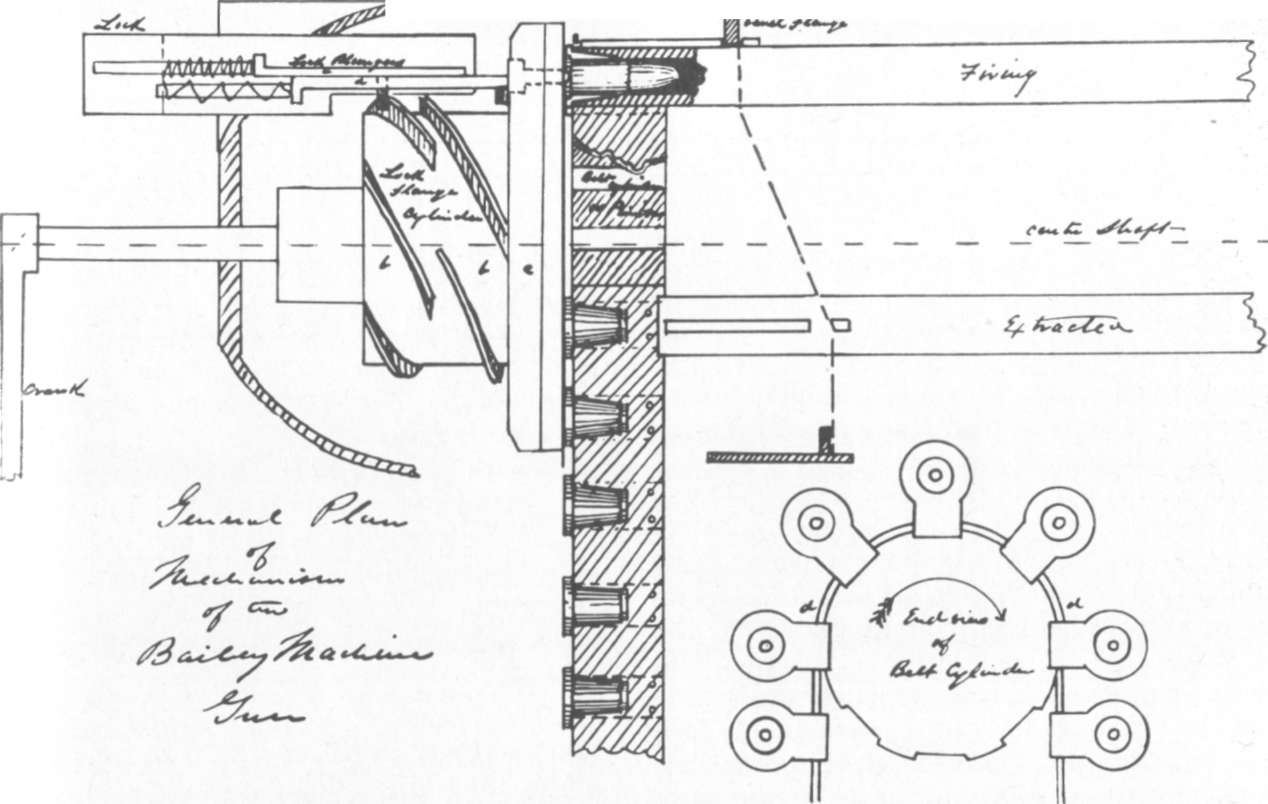
Sketch of the Bailey machine gun mechanism, drawn during the 1876 trials.

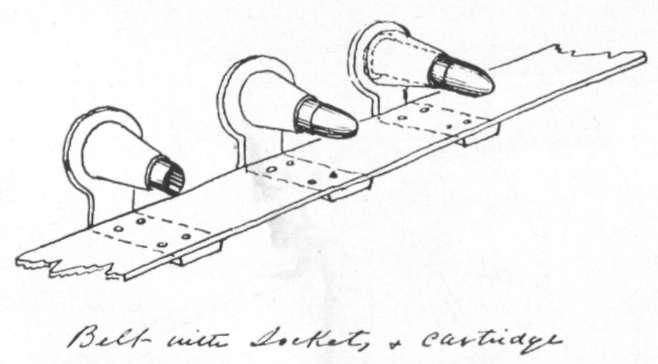
Sketch of the Bailey Machine Gun belt, drawn during the 1876 trials.

Superficially, the Bailey Machine Gun resembled the Gatling gun, as it also had multiple barrels and was hand cranked. The similarity was only superficial though, as the firing mechanism of the Bailey Machine Gun was significantly different than that of the Gatling gun.

The Bailey Machine Gun used a belt feed system that did not remove the cartridges from the belt as the weapon was fired. Other rapid-fire weapons of this era used a drum or hopper to hold the ammunition. The belt-feed was considered to be very innovative, and many later machine guns would end up using belt-feed mechanisms of some sort.

When the handle was cranked, the barrels as well as the firing mechanism rotated. The round was fired from the top barrel, and the weapon was designed so that a round could not be fired until the round and its associated barrel reached the top position on the weapon. This prevented accidental premature discharges.

== See also ==
- Ripley machine gun – Early volley gun
- Gardner gun – Machine gun
- Hotchkiss revolving cannon – Guns from Hotchkiss arms company
- Gatling gun – 1860s multi-barrel rapid-fire gun
- List of multiple barrel firearms
