= Hotchkiss gun =

Guns from Hotchkiss arms company

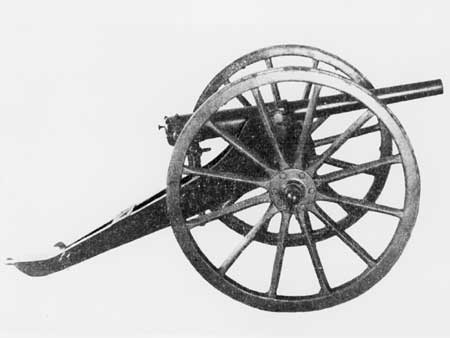
A Hotchkiss 42 mm gun

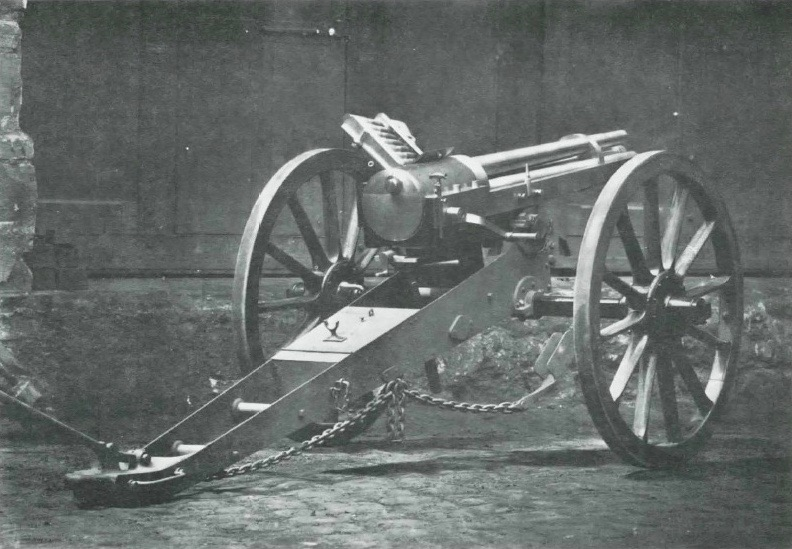
The Hotchkiss Revolving Cannon picture published 1874

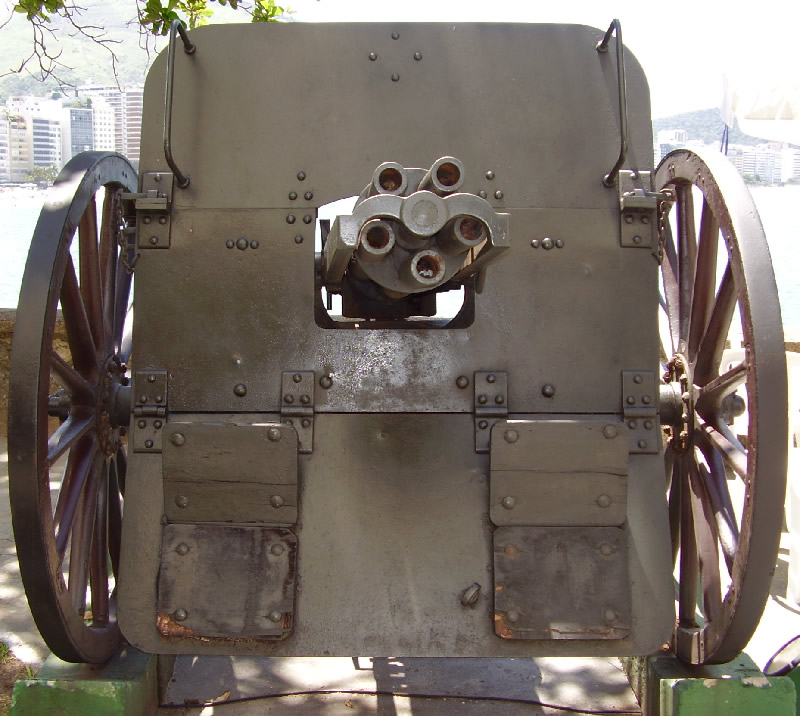
Hotchkiss 5-barrel revolving cannon, Fort Copacabana

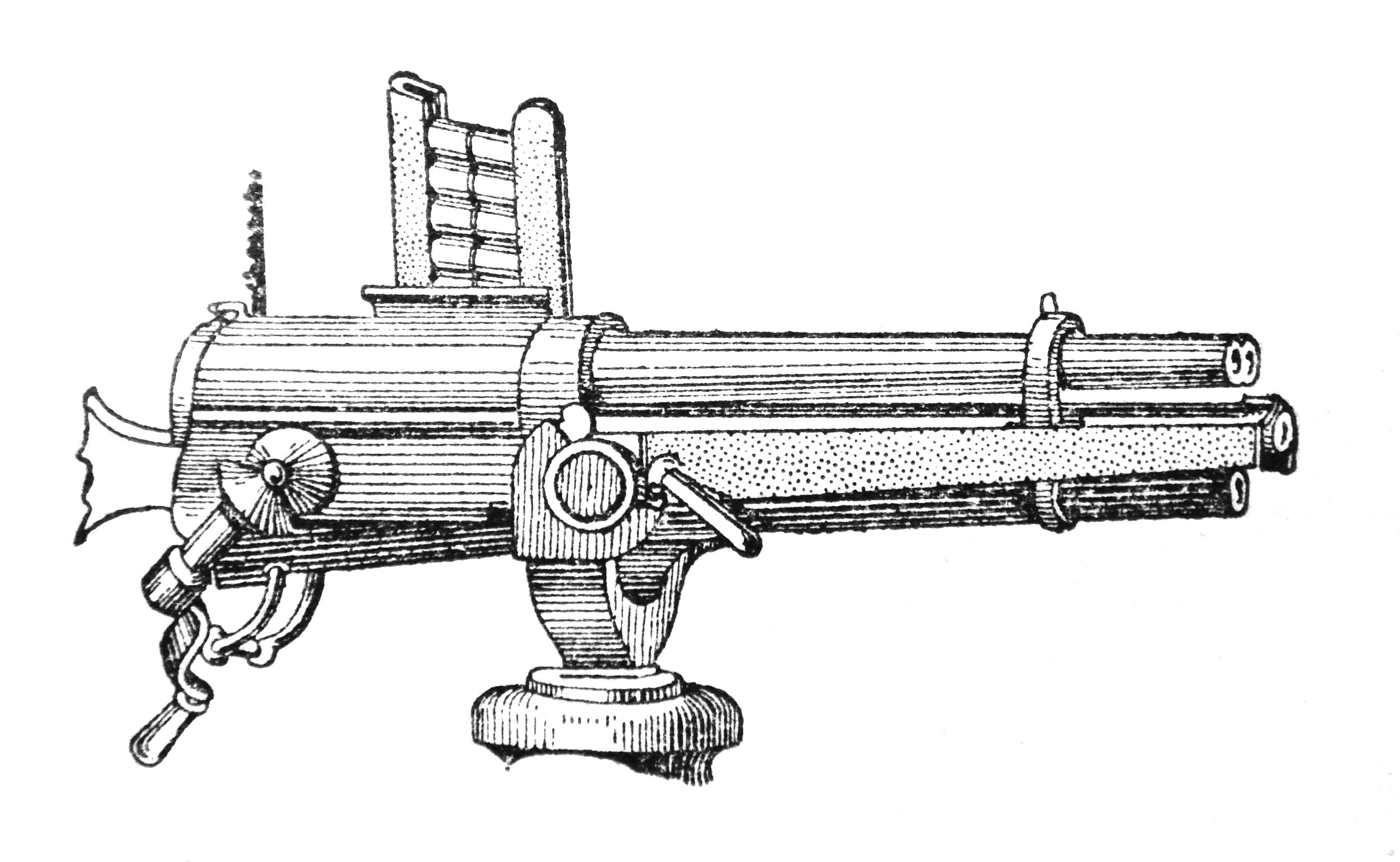
A ship mounted Hotchkiss cannon

The Hotchkiss gun can refer to different types of the Hotchkiss arms company starting in the late 19th century. It usually refers to the 1.65-inch (42 mm) light mountain gun. There were also navy (37 & 47 mm) and 3-inch (76 mm) Hotchkiss guns. The 42 mm gun was intended to be mounted on a light carriage or packed on two mules to accompany a troop of cavalry or an army traveling in rough country.

== Descriptions ==
=== 1.65-inch gun ===
The 1.65-inch (42 mm) gun and accessories could be packed on two mules. The gun was introduced as a modern replacement for the M1841 12-pounder mountain howitzer. The first gun purchased by the US military from the French arms firm of Hotchkiss was employed against the Nez Percé in 1877. Over the next twenty years the US purchased 56. They were used at the Wounded Knee Massacre in 1890, and again in Cuba at the Battle of Las Guasimas, the Battle of El Caney and the attack on San Juan Hill during the Spanish–American War of 1898.

=== Hotchkiss revolving cannon ===
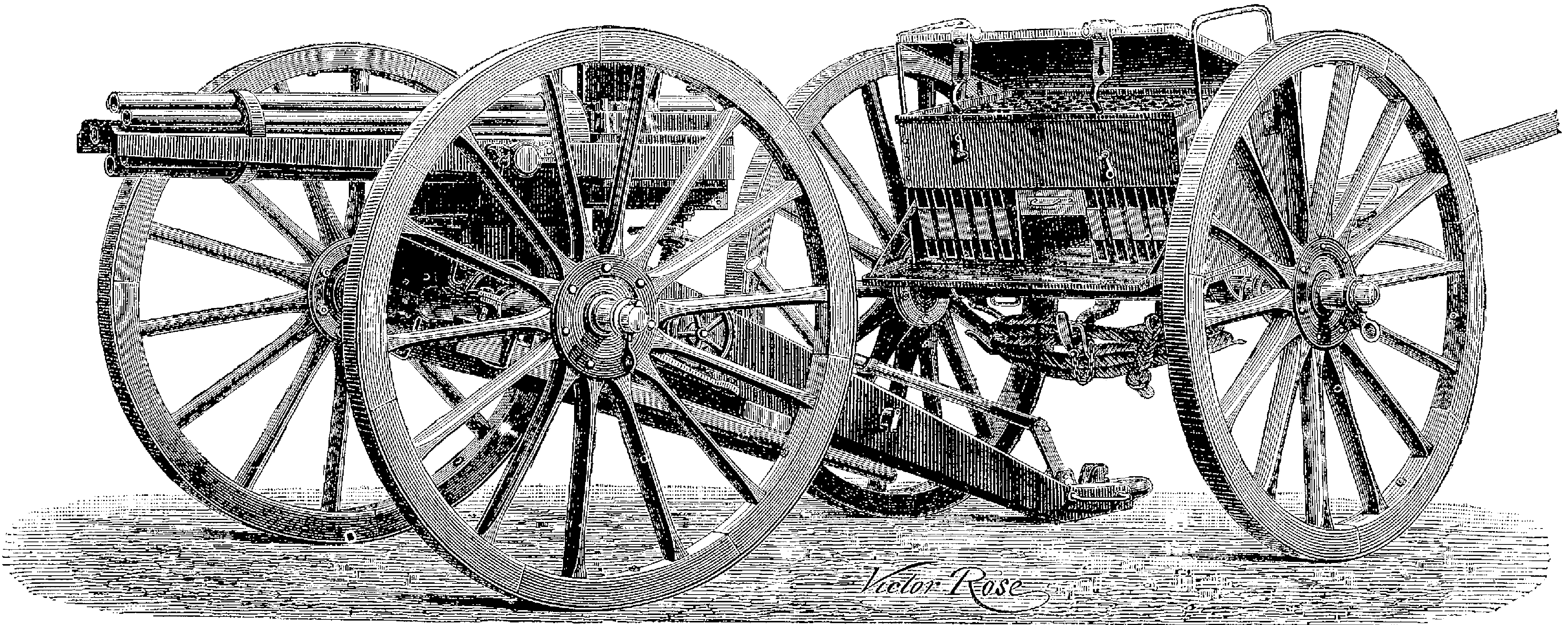
Hotchkiss mitrailleuse, adopted for French fortresses

The Hotchkiss revolving cannon was a rotating barrel weapon invented in 1872 by Benjamin B. Hotchkiss (1826–1885), founder of Hotchkiss & Co. It was used by German authorities in the 19th century. It was also referred to as the "Hotchkiss gun". Though superficially resembling a Gatling gun, the internals are very different, with only a single reciprocating bolt rather than a separate action for every barrel. It was a built-up, rifled, rapid-fire gun of oil-tempered steel, having a rectangular breechblock which moved in a mortise cut completely through the jacket. It was designed to be light enough to travel with cavalry, and had an effective range beyond that of rifled small-arms.

The 1-pounder revolving Hotchkiss cannon had five 37 mm barrels, and was capable of firing 68 rounds per minute with an accuracy range of 2,000 yards (1,800 m). Each feed magazine held ten rounds and weighed approximately 18 pounds (8 kg). Besides the field gun version, there were several other versions of the 37 mm Hotchkiss revolving cannon, notably versions for naval defense against torpedo boats and fortress versions firing shrapnel or canister shells for the defense of moats. At least one US Army field artillery battery was equipped with five 37mm (known as 1.45-inch) Hotchkiss revolving cannons in the early 1890s, supplementing its complement of 3.2-inch breechloading rifles. The naval version was adopted by Russia and the United States, amongst others. The field cannon version was accompanied by a horse-drawn ammunition limber, which held 110 rounds plus six loaded magazines, totaling 170 rounds. One example is on display at the Museum of the History of the Brazilian Army at Fort Copacabana, Rio de Janeiro.

A 3-pounder 47 mm Hotchkiss revolver cannon was also adopted by the US and Russian navies in the 1880s. This had five barrels. With 3-pounder and 1-pounder weapons, it is difficult to determine from references what type of weapons a particular ship had. Single-shot, revolver cannon, and (from 1890) Maxim-Nordenfelt 1-pounder cannon weapons were all used on new warships from 1880 to 1910. All of these were called quick-firing or, in the US, rapid-firing. In the US Army, at least one field artillery battery equipped a single "heavy" revolving cannon in the late 1890s (likely for purposes of testing its effectiveness), probably the 3-pounder model.

== Other guns ==
Hotchkiss also produced a range of light naval guns and, in the 1930s, anti-tank guns. The naval guns which originated in the 1880s were mostly 3-pounders and 6-pounders and originally were widely used (by Britain, Russia, and the United States amongst others) for close-up defense of major warships against small craft armed with the newly invented locomotive torpedo. When improvements in torpedo range made them obsolete in this role, they continued to be used as small-craft armament up to and including World War II. In World War I the British motor gunboats which won naval supremacy from the Germans on Lake Tanganyika were armed with the Hotchkiss 3-pounder. The Hotchkiss 6-pounder was adopted by the British army for the first tanks. During World War II the 6-pounder was the main weapon of the early units of the numerous and successful Fairmile D Motor Torpedo Boats of the Royal Navy, not being entirely replaced by more modern weapons until 1945.

== See also ==
- Gatling gun – Multi-barrel repeating firearm, 1860s-1910s
- Ripley machine gun – Early volley gun
- Gardner gun – Machine gun
- Bailey machine gun
