= S333 Thunderstruck =

Personal defense revolver

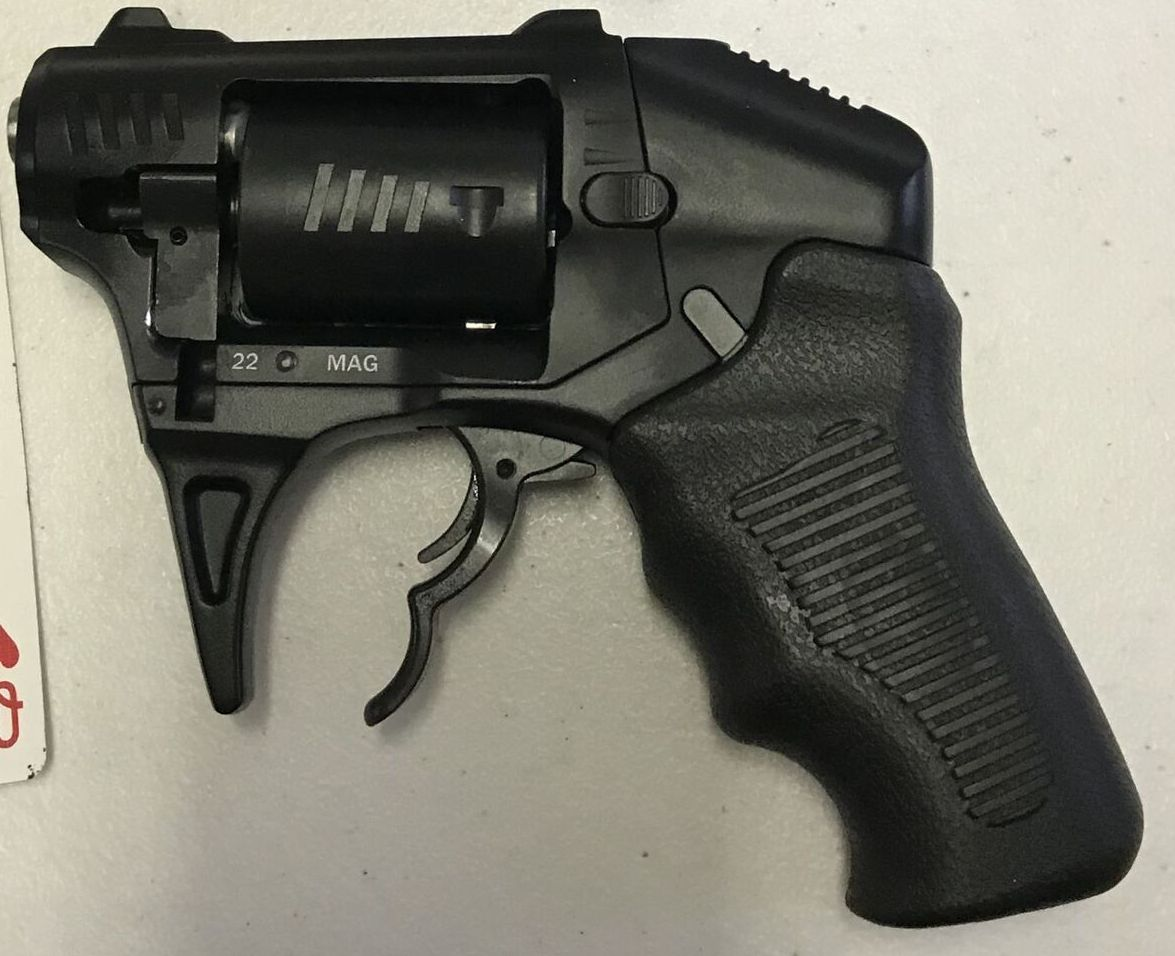
- Type: Revolver
- Place of origin: United States

Production history
- Designed: c. 2019
- Manufacturer: Standard Manufacturing
- Unit cost: $369 (MSRP)
- Produced: 2019–present

Specifications
- Mass: 18 oz (510 g)
- Barrel length: 1.25 or 1.5 in (32 or 38 mm)
- Cartridge: .22 Winchester Magnum Rimfire
- Action: Double action only (DAO) volley gun
- Rate of fire: 2 rounds (simultaneously) per pull
- Feed system: 8-round cylinder
- Sights: Iron sights

The S333 Thunderstruck is an aluminum-frame revolver, designed and manufactured by Standard Manufacturing of New Britain, Connecticut, and intended for concealed carry. Introduced in 2019, the S333 is a double barrel revolver with an eight-round cylinder. A type of volley gun, each trigger pull simultaneously fires two .22 Winchester Magnum Rimfire cartridges.

== Background ==
Standard Manufacturing is known for producing the DP-12, a pump action double-barreled shotgun with dual tube magazines, with each trigger pull alternating which barrel is fired from. In 2017, Standard Manufacturing introduced the S333 Volleyfire, a pepper-box revolver with a cylinder holding six rounds of .25 ACP, generally regarded as a low-powered cartridge. The Volleyfire has dual firing mechanisms and barrels, such that each trigger pull fires two rounds simultaneously. As of October 2019, the Volleyfire was no longer in production.

=== Etymology ===
The "333" in the name is a reference to a firearms rule of three: "most self defense scenarios take place within three yards, with three shots fired in under three seconds."

== Operation ==
Like its precursor the Volleyfire, the Thunderstruck has dual firing mechanisms and barrels, such that each trigger pull fires two rounds simultaneously. The Thunderstruck's cylinder holds eight rounds of .22 Winchester Magnum Rimfire (.22 WMR). It has been offered with barrel lengths of 1.25 inches (32 mm) and 1.5 inches (38 mm)—the part number for both offerings is the same.

There is a partial trigger guard (not wrap-around) along with a blade safety on the trigger, which is meant to be pulled using two fingers and requires a pull exceeding 20 pounds-force (89 N). Operation is double action only (DAO) and there is no exposed hammer.

=== Legality ===
Part of the definition of a machine gun per United States federal law is "Any weapon which shoots, is designed to shoot, or can be readily restored to shoot, automatically more than one shot without manual reloading, by a single function of the trigger". However, per the manufacturer, the Bureau of Alcohol, Tobacco, Firearms and Explosives (ATF) has stated that the Thunderstruck "...does not meet the ATF definition of a 'machine gun'." Reportedly, this is because the two rounds are fired simultaneously, not sequentially.
