= Gatling gun =

Multi-barrel repeating firearm, 1860s-1910s

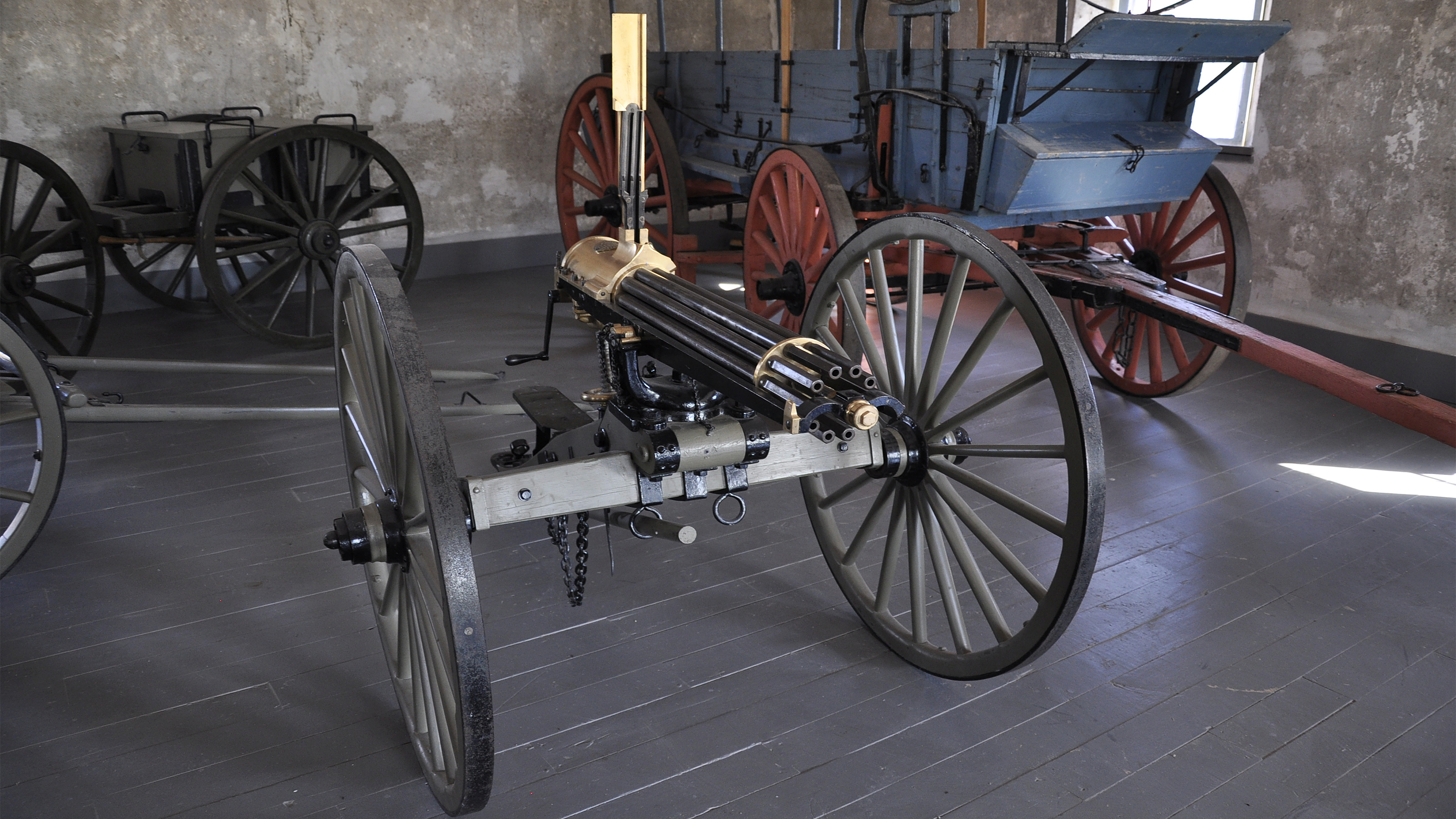
- 1876 Gatling gun kept at Fort Laramie National Historic Site
- Type: Rapid-fire gun, hand-cranked machine gun
- Place of origin: United States

Service history
- In service: 1862–1911
- Used by: See Users
- Wars: American Civil War; Boshin War; Indian Wars; Franco-Prussian War; Anglo-Ashanti War; Ethiopian-Egyptian War; Haw Wars; Russo-Turkish War (1877–1878); Second Anglo-Afghan War; Anglo-Zulu War; War of the Pacific; Argentine Civil Wars; Russian conquest of Central Asia; Kiriji War; Mahdist War; Anglo-Egyptian War; Colombian Civil War (1884–1885); Northwest Rebellion; Italo-Ethiopian War of 1887–1889; Revolution of the Park; Argentine Revolution of 1893; Revolta da Armada; First Sino-Japanese War Second Matabele War; Spanish–American War; Philippine–American War; Boxer Rebellion; Colorado Labor Wars; Russo-Japanese War (limited); 1907 Honduran Conflict; Mexican Revolution; Battle of Blair Mountain

Production history
- Designer: Richard Jordan Gatling
- Designed: 1861
- Manufacturer: Eagle Iron Works; Cooper Firearms Manufacturing Company; Colt's Patent Firearms; American Ordnance Company
- Produced: 1862–1903

Specifications
- Mass: 170 lb (77.2 kg)
- Length: 42.5 in (1,079 mm)
- length: 26.5 in (673 mm)
- Crew: 4

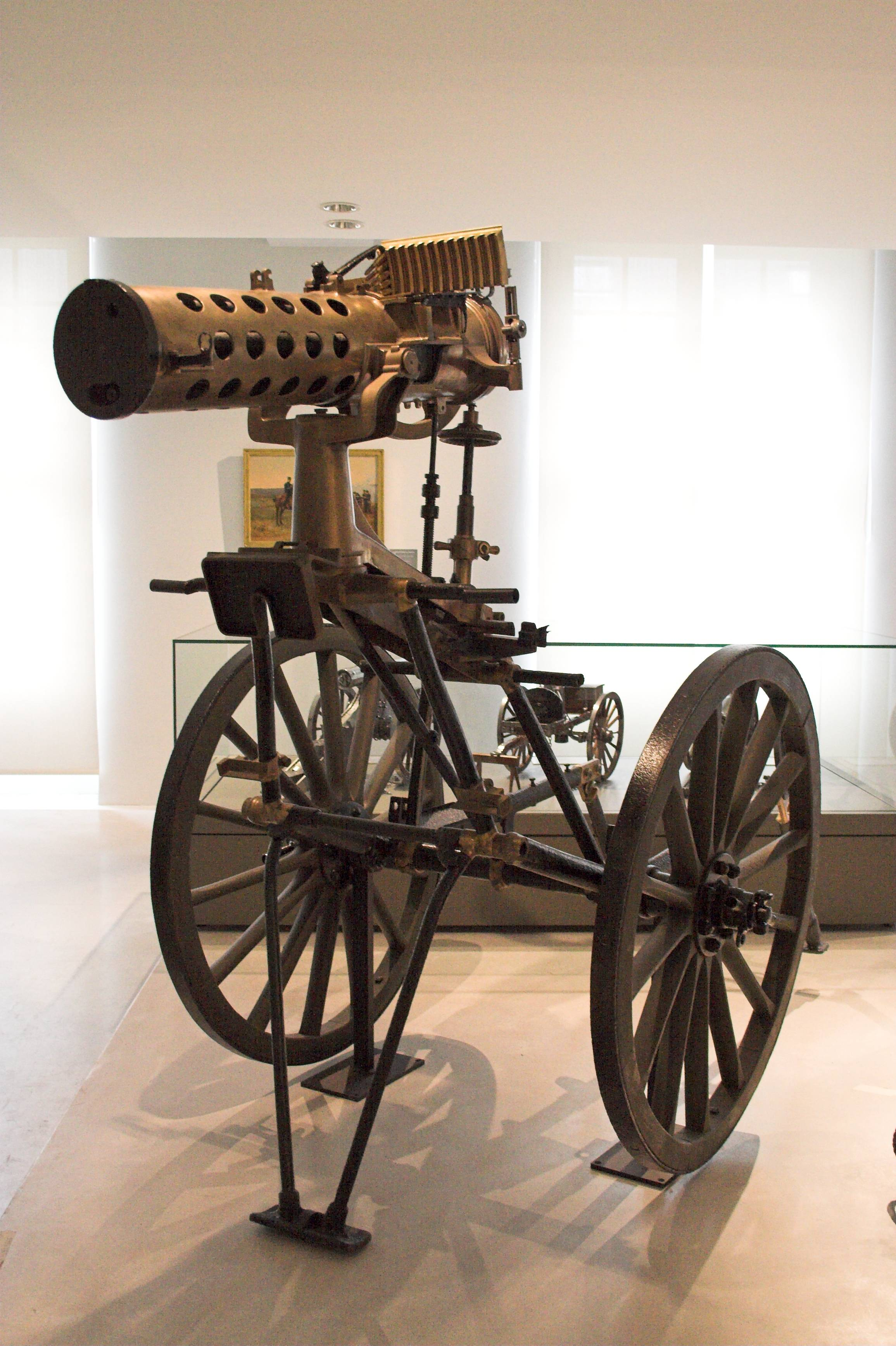
Mitrailleuse Gatling modèle APX 1895

The Gatling gun, also known in Russia as the Gorloff, is a rapid-firing multiple-barrel firearm invented in Indiana in 1861 by North Carolina native Richard Jordan Gatling. It is an early machine gun and a forerunner of the modern electric motor-driven rotary cannon.

The Gatling gun is centered on a cyclic multi-barrel design which facilitated cooling and synchronized the firing-reloading sequence. As the handwheel is cranked, the barrels rotate, and each barrel sequentially loads a single cartridge from a top-mounted magazine, fires off the shot when it reaches a set position (usually at 4 o'clock), then ejects the spent casing out of the left side at the bottom, after which the barrel is empty and allowed to cool until rotated back to the top position and gravity-fed another new round. This configuration eliminated the need for a single reciprocating bolt design and allowed higher rates of fire to be achieved without the barrels overheating quickly.

One of the best-known early rapid-firearms, the Gatling gun saw occasional use by the Union Army during the American Civil War, which was the first time it was employed in combat. It was later used in numerous military conflicts, including the Boshin War, the Anglo-Zulu War, and the assault on San Juan Hill during the Spanish–American War. It was also used by the Pennsylvania militia in episodes of the Great Railroad Strike of 1877, specifically in Pittsburgh. Gatling guns were also mounted aboard ships.

== Design ==
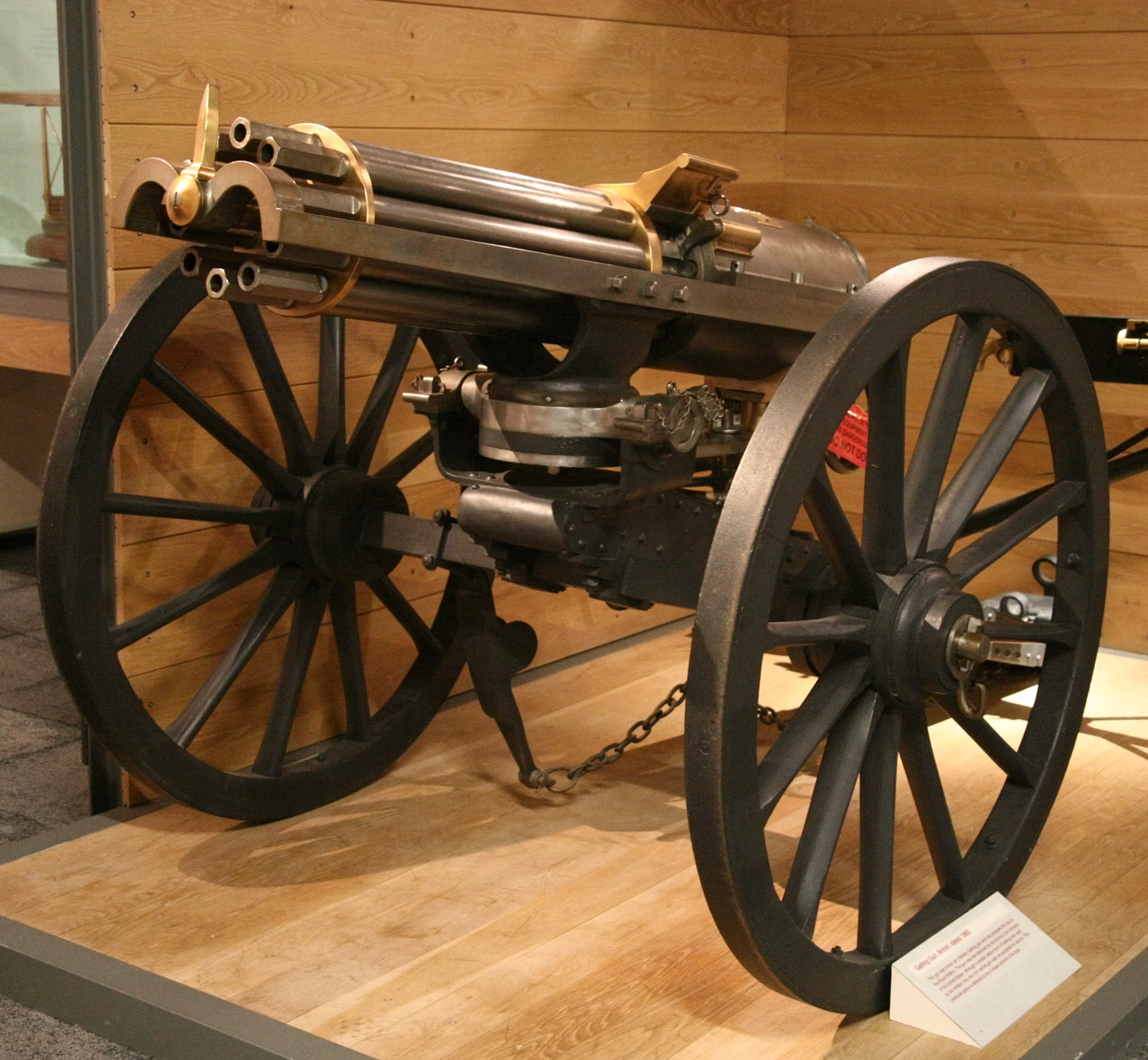
A British 1865 Gatling gun at Firepower – The Royal Artillery Museum

=== Operating mechanism ===
The Gatling gun is operated by a hand-crank mechanism, with six barrels revolving around a central shaft (although some models had as many as ten). Each barrel fires once per revolution at about the same position. The barrels, a carrier, and a lock cylinder were separate and all mounted on a solid plate revolving around a central shaft, mounted on an oblong fixed frame. Turning the crank rotated the shaft. The carrier was grooved and the lock cylinder was drilled with holes corresponding to the barrels. The casing was partitioned, and through this opening, the barrel shaft was journaled. In front of the casing was a cam with spiral surfaces. The cam imparted a reciprocating motion to the locks when the gun rotated. Also in the casing was a cocking ring with projections to cock and fire the gun. Each barrel had a single lock, working in the lock cylinder on a line with the barrel. The lock cylinder was encased and joined to the frame. Early models had a fibrous matting stuffed in among the barrels, which could be soaked with water to cool the barrels down. Later models eliminated the matting jacketing as being unnecessary.

=== Feeding and firing cycle ===
Cartridges, held in a hopper, dropped individually into the grooves of the carrier. The lock was simultaneously forced by the cam to move forward and load the cartridge, and when the cam was at its highest point, the cocking ring freed the lock and fired the cartridge. After the cartridge was fired the continuing action of the cam drew back the lock bringing with it the spent casing which then dropped to the ground.

=== Early ammunition systems ===
The grouped barrel concept had been explored by inventors since the 18th century, but poor engineering and the lack of a unitary cartridge made previous designs unsuccessful. The initial Gatling gun design used self-contained, reloadable steel cylinders with a chamber holding a ball and black-powder charge, and a percussion cap on one end. As the barrels rotated, these steel cylinders dropped into place, were fired, and were then ejected from the gun. The innovative features of the Gatling gun were its independent firing mechanism for each barrel and the simultaneous action of the locks, barrels, carrier, and breech.

The ammunition that Gatling eventually implemented was a paper cartridge charged with black powder and primed with a percussion cap because self-contained brass cartridges were not yet fully developed and available. The shells were gravity-fed into the breech through a hopper or simple box "magazine" with an unsprung gravity follower on top of the gun. Each barrel had its own firing mechanism.

=== Feed systems and sustained fire ===
Despite self-contained brass cartridges replacing the paper cartridge in the 1860s, it was only in the Model 1881 that Gatling switched to the 'Bruce'-style feed system (U.S. Patents 247,158 and 343,532) which accepted two rows of .45-70 cartridges. While one row was being fed into the gun, the other could be reloaded, thus allowing sustained fire. The final gun required four operators. By 1886, the gun was capable of firing more than 400 rounds per minute.

=== Broadwell drum feed ===
The smallest-caliber gun also had a Broadwell drum feed in place of the curved box of the other guns. The drum, named after L. W. Broadwell, an agent for Gatling's company, comprised twenty stacks of rounds arranged around a central axis, like the spokes of a wheel, each holding twenty cartridges with the bullet noses oriented toward the central axis. This invention was patented in U. S. 110,338. As each stack emptied, the drum was manually rotated to bring a new stack into use until all 400 rounds had been fired. A more common variant had 240 rounds in twenty stands of fifteen.

=== Smokeless powder models ===
By 1893, the Gatling was adapted to take the new .30 Army smokeless cartridge. The new M1893 guns featured six barrels, later increased to ten barrels, and were capable of a maximum (initial) rate of fire of 800–900 rounds per minute, though 600 rpm was recommended for continuous fire. Dr. Gatling later used examples of the M1893 powered by electric motor and belt to drive the crank. Tests demonstrated the electric Gatling could fire bursts of up to 1,500 rpm.

=== Late models and military service ===
The M1893, with minor revisions, became the M1895, and 94 guns were produced for the U.S. Army by Colt. Four M1895 Gatlings under Lieutenant John H. Parker saw considerable combat during the Santiago campaign in Cuba in 1898. The M1895 was designed to accept only the Bruce feeder. All previous models were unpainted, but the M1895 was painted olive drab green, with some parts left blued.

Model 1900 was very similar to Model 1895 but with only a few components finished in O.D. green. The U.S. Army purchased several M1900s. All Gatling Models 1895-1903 could be mounted on an armored field carriage. In 1903, the Army converted its M1900 guns from .30 Army to fit the new .30-03 cartridge (standardized for the M1903 Springfield rifle) as the M1903. The later M1903-'06 was an M1903 converted to .30-06. This conversion was principally carried out at the Army's Springfield Armory arsenal repair shops. All models of Gatling guns were declared obsolete by the U.S. military in 1911, after 45 years of service.

=== Design significance ===
The original Gatling gun was a field weapon that used multiple rotating barrels turned by a hand crank, and firing loose (no links or belt) metal cartridge ammunition using a gravity feed system from a hopper. The Gatling gun's innovation lay in the use of multiple barrels to limit overheating, a rotating mechanism, and a gravity-feed reloading system, which allowed unskilled operators to achieve a relatively high rate of fire of 200 rounds per minute.

=== Comparison with automatic weapons ===
Although the first Gatling gun was capable of firing continuously, it required a person to crank it and so it was not a true automatic weapon. The Maxim gun, invented and patented in 1883, was the first true fully-automatic weapon making use of the fired projectile's recoil force to reload the weapon. Nonetheless, the Gatling gun represented a huge leap in firearm technology.

=== Predecessors and battlefield role ===
Before the Gatling gun, the only weapons available to military forces that could fire many projectiles in a short period of time were mass-firing volley weapons, like the Belgian and French mitrailleuse of the 1860s and 1870s, and field cannons firing canister shot, much like an upsized shotgun. The latter was widely used during and after the Napoleonic Wars. Although the maximum rate of fire was increased by firing multiple projectiles simultaneously, those weapons still needed to be reloaded after each discharge, which for multi-barrel systems like the mitrailleuse was cumbersome and time-consuming. That negated much of the advantage of their high rate of fire per discharge by making them much less powerful on the battlefield. In comparison, the Gatling gun offered a rapid and continuous rate of fire without having to be manually reloaded by opening the breech.

Early multi-barrel guns were approximately the size and weight of artillery pieces and were often perceived as a replacement for cannons firing grapeshot or canister shot. Compared with earlier weapons such as the mitrailleuse, which required manual reloading, the Gatling gun was more reliable and easier to operate and had a lower, but continuous rate of fire. The large wheels required to move these guns around required a high firing position, which increased the vulnerability of their crews.

=== Operational limitations ===
Sustained firing of black powder cartridges generated a cloud of smoke, making concealment impossible until smokeless powder became available in the late 19th century. When operators were firing Gatling guns against troops of industrialized nations, they were at risk, being vulnerable to artillery they could not reach and snipers they could not see.

== History ==
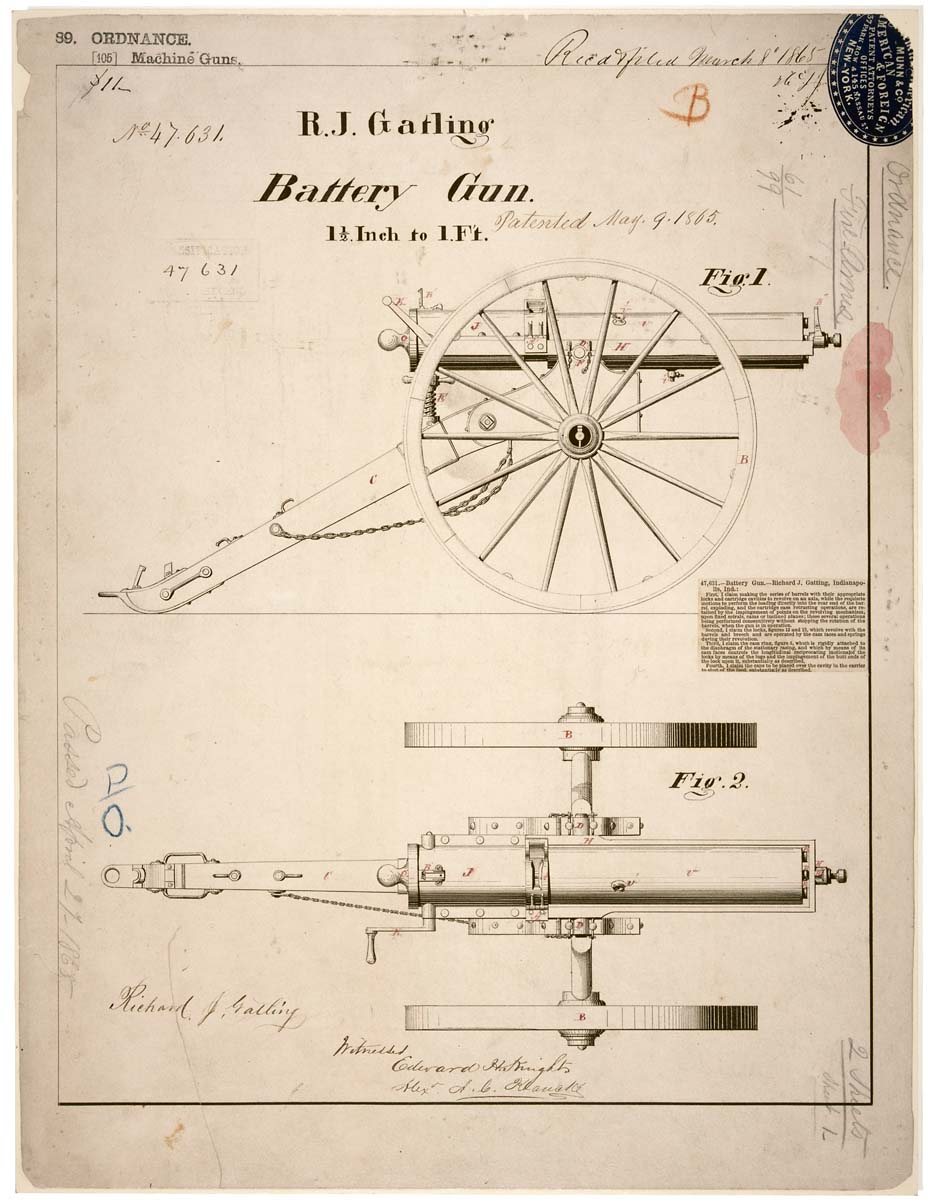
Patent drawing for R. J. Gatling's "battery gun", 9 May 1865

The Gatling gun was designed by the American inventor Richard J. Gatling in 1861 and patented on November 4, 1862. Gatling wrote that he created it to reduce the size of armies and so reduce the number of deaths by combat and disease.

=== United States and South America ===
The US Army adopted Gatling guns in several calibers, including .42 caliber, .45-70, .50 caliber, 1 inch, and (M1893 and later) .30 Army, with conversions of M1900 weapons to .30-03 and .30-06. The .45-70 weapon was also mounted on some US Navy ships of the 1880s and 1890s.

The British manufacturer James George Accles, previously employed by Colt 1867–1886, developed a modified Gatling gun circa 1888 known as the Accles Machine Gun. Circa 1895, the American Ordnance Company acquired the rights to manufacture and distribute this weapon in the Americas. It was trialed by the US Navy in December 1895, and was said to be the only weapon to complete the trial out of five competing weapons, but was apparently not adopted by US forces.

The Gatling gun was first used in warfare during the American Civil War. Twelve of the guns were purchased personally by Union commanders and used in the trenches during the Siege of Petersburg, Virginia (June 1864–April 1865). Eight other Gatling guns were fitted on gunboats. The gun was not accepted by the American Army until 1866 when a sales representative of the manufacturing company demonstrated it in combat.

On July 17, 1863, Gatling guns were purportedly used to overawe New York anti-draft rioters. Two were brought by a Pennsylvania National Guard unit from Philadelphia to use against strikers in Pittsburgh.

Gatling guns were famously not used at the Battle of the Little Bighorn, also known as "Custer's Last Stand," when General George Armstrong Custer chose not to bring Gatling guns with his main force.

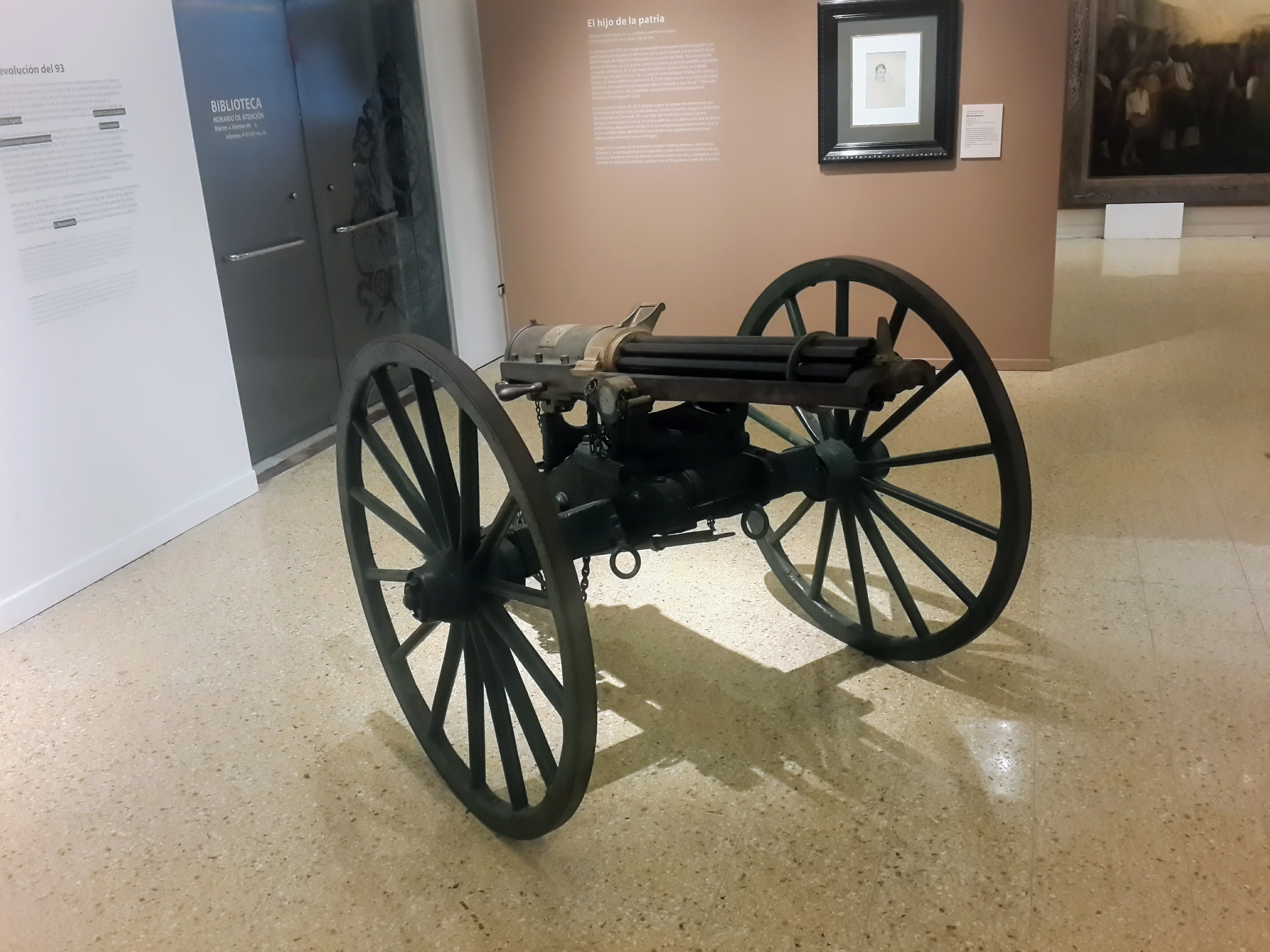

In April 1867, a Gatling gun was purchased for the Argentine Army by Interior Minister Domingo F. Sarmiento under instructions from President Bartolomé Mitre. However, it did not see active service during the Paraguayan War.

The Brazilian Imperial military purchased a couple of Gatling guns from the 1870s onward.

Captain Luis Germán Astete of the Peruvian Navy took with him dozens of Gatling guns from the United States to Peru in December 1879 during the Peru-Chile War of the Pacific. Gatling guns were used by the Peruvian Navy and Army, especially in the Battle of Tacna (May 1880) and the Battle of San Juan (January 1881) against the invading Chilean Army.

In 1888, the SS Ozama smuggled a number of Gatling guns into Haiti.

In 1907, Gatling guns were used by Nicaragua in the battle of Namasique, largely manned by American mercenaries.

Gatling guns were kept in store by coal companies and used during the Battle of Blair Mountain in 1921. On September 1, a group of striking miners stole one of the guns and assaulted a valley called Craddock Fork near the town of Lake. Opposing forces fought back with a machine gun, but after three hours of heavy fire, their weapon jammed. The miners surged forward and briefly broke the defensive line, but were repulsed by another machine gun nest located further up the ridge.

=== Russia ===
According to author John Ellis, the Russians were amongst the first to realize the potential of machine guns, testing two Gatlings in 1865 and promptly ordering twenty for the Imperial Russian Army, eventually obtaining a license to build them locally and by 1876, the Russians had 400 Gatlings organized in eight batteries. Historical writer Chris McNab gives a different account, stating that the Russians had been introduced to the Gatling in 1871, not 1865, when Colonel Aleksandr Pavlovich Gorloff was given a demonstration, and impressed by what he saw, ordered 400 Gatlings for the Imperial Army.

Before the guns were shipped to Russia, Gorloff ordered nameplates bearing his own name to be manufactured and fixed them in place of the original plates bearing the Colt's Patent Firearms company—subsequently, the Gatling gun became known in Russia as the Gorloff gun. In an early example of Russian disinformation, an article published in the Journal de St.-Pétersbourg in November 27, 1870 stated that:

The mitrailleuse adopted in Russia is on a model invented by Major-General Gorloff and based upon the American Gatling system. The Gorloff gun, however, only resembles the Gatling in exterior form and is quite original. In perfecting his arm, Dr Gatling has, it appears, been guilty of important plagiarisms on the Gorloff model, which has a just title to the name of the 'Russian mitrailleuse'.

Both Ellis and McNab accounts agree that these guns saw Russo-Turkish War (1877–1878), where they were effectively used at the Battle of Nikopol and the Siege of Plevna. The Gorloff gun was also used during the Russian conquest of Central Asia to repel Turkmen cavalry charges. In one of the last uses of mechanical machine guns in combat, some Gatling-Gorloffs were used to defend fortifications in Port Arthur during the Russo-Japanese War of 1904–1905.

=== Africa and Asia ===
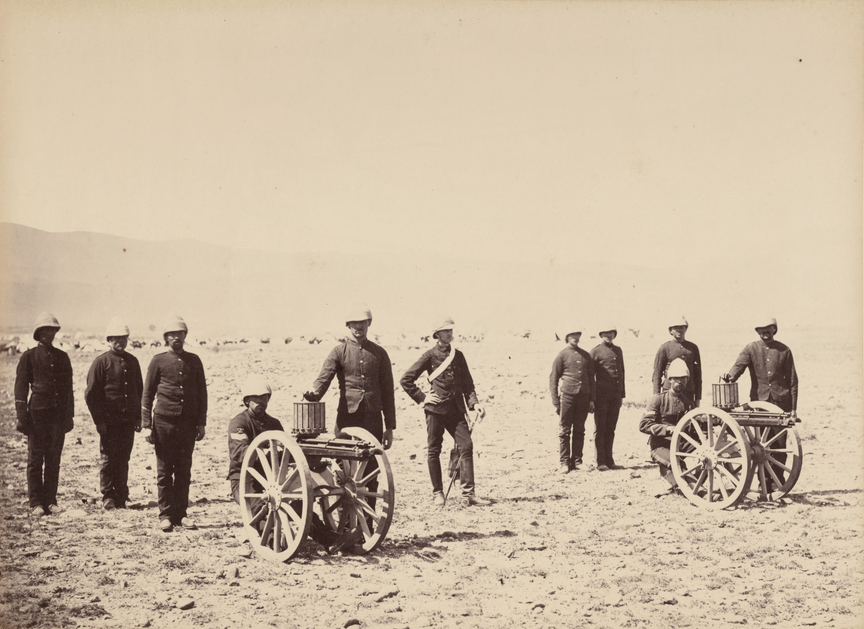
Two British Army Gatling guns from the Second Anglo-Afghan War

The Gatling gun was used most successfully to expand European colonial empires by defeating indigenous warriors mounting massed attacks, including the Zulu, the Bedouin, and the Mahdists. The British Army first deployed the Gatling gun in 1873–74 during the Anglo-Ashanti wars, and extensively during the last actions of the 1879 Anglo-Zulu war. The Royal Navy used Gatling guns during the 1882 Anglo-Egyptian War.

The British models, introduced in 1874 for the army and navy were fed with .45 inch (11.5 mm) cartridges, while the Royal Navy later adopted a .65 caliber for ship-mounted guns and coastal fortifications. The .45 bottlenecked coiled brass cartridges had a tendency of getting torn off, jamming the mechanism, specially in dusty or sandy environments. Afterwards the British began using drawn brass cartridges, solving the reliability issues.

The Gatling gun inspired Sir Henry Newbolt to write a poem in 1892 about the Battle of Abu Klea (1885), though the British troops used the similar Gardner gun instead:

The sands of the desert are sodden red
Red with the wrack of a square that broke
The Gatlings jammed and the Colonel dead
And the regiment blind with the dust and smoke.

— Sir Henry Newbolt, Vitaï Lampada

Gatling guns were used by Egyptian forces both on sea and land and saw combat in Sudan and Abyssinia. Isma'il Pasha ordered 120 Colt 1865 six-barrel Gatling guns; after being convinced by Shahine Pasha who witnessed Gatling gun trials at Shoeburyness in 1866. In 1872 a few ''camel'' guns were purchased, these were smaller and used a tripod instead of the carriage. During the Siege of Khartoum an Egyptian Gatling gun aided by a telescope was able to target Sudanese artillery crews from a distance of 2,000 yards.

Gatling guns were imported by some states in Nigeria. They were used during the Kalabari Civil War of 1879–83, the Abbi House bought one from King Jaja of Opobo and it may have been used in canoe warfare. The Ijesha used a Gatling gun against the Ibadan during the early 1880s. In 1882 the Bonny used a Gatling gun during an attack on New Calabar.

By 1880, the Siam kingdom, now Thailand, had imported an unknown number of Gatlings. By 1885 the kingdom had a Gatling Gun regiment of 600 men; those weapons were possibly used in the Haw Wars. They were also seen among Prince Bigit's escort in 1886.

The Korean Empire possessed a number of Gatlings. Six had been imported in 1884, by 1891 it had a battery of fourteen guns and in 1894 the army's two American drilled regiments had as many as 40 Gatlings and practiced regularly (Supposedly because the noise pleased Emperor Gojong). Some of them were deployed to defend the approaches of the capital during the Donghak Rebellion, but there is no evidence they saw combat.

=== British North America ===
Lieutenant Arthur L. Howard of the Connecticut National Guard had an interest in the company manufacturing Gatling guns. In 1885 Howard brought a personally owned Gatling gun to the North-West Territories of Canada in what is now, since 1905, the Province of Saskatchewan for use with the Canadian military against Métis and First Nations rebels during the North-West Rebellion of 1885 led by Louis Riel.

=== Spanish–American War ===
Gatling guns were used successfully by the U.S. Army during the Spanish–American War in 1898. A four-gun battery of Model 1895 ten-barrel Gatling guns chambered in .30 Army, made by Colt, was formed as part of a separate detachment led by Lieutenant John "Gatling Gun" Parker. The detachment proved very effective, supporting the advance of American forces at the Battle of San Juan Hill. Three of the Gatlings with swivel mountings were used with great success against the Spanish defenders. During the American charge up San Juan and Kettle hills, the three guns fired a total of 18,000 rounds in 8 1/2 minutes (an average of over 700 rounds per minute per gun of continuous fire) against Spanish troop positions along the crest of both hills, causing significant casualties.

Despite this successful deployment, the Gatling's weight and cumbersome artillery carriage hindered its ability to keep up with infantry forces over uneven terrain, particularly in Cuba, where roads were often little more than jungle footpaths. By this time, the U.S. Marines had been issued the modern tripod-mounted M1895 Colt–Browning machine gun using the 6mm Lee Navy round, which they employed to defeat the Spanish infantry at the battle of Cuzco Wells.

=== Philippine–American War ===
Gatling guns were used by the U.S. Army during the Philippine–American War.

One such instance was during the Battle of San Jacinto (1899) (Spanish: Batalla de San Jacinto) which was fought on November 11, 1899, in San Jacinto in the Philippines, between Philippine Republican Army soldiers and American troops.

The Gatling's weight and artillery carriage hindered its ability to keep up with American troops over uneven terrain, especially in the Philippines, where movement outside the cities was hindered by dense forests and steep mountain paths.

== Further development ==
After the Gatling gun was phased out and replaced by newer recoil or gas-operated weapons, the approach of using multiple externally powered rotating barrels fell into disuse for many decades. However, some examples were developed during the interwar years, but only existed as prototypes or were rarely used. The concept resurfaced after World War II with the development of the Minigun and the M61 Vulcan in particular for use in aircraft over reciprocating bolt autocannons which are more prone to jamming in high g environments. Multiple other rotating barrel firearms were built from the late 20th century to the present, the largest of them being the 30mm GAU-8 Avenger autocannon as used on the Fairchild Republic A-10 Thunderbolt II.

== Users ==
- Argentina
- Austria-Hungary
- Brazil
- British Empire
- Bolivia
- Kingdom of Bonny
- Chile
- Colombia
- Khedivate of Egypt
- France
- Haiti
- Kingdom of Hawaii
- Ijesha Kingdom
- Kingdom of Italy
- Empire of Japan
- Kalabari Kingdom
- Korean Empire
- Liberation Army of the South
- Kingdom of Montenegro
- Morocco
- Nagaoka Domain
- Nicaragua
- Ottoman Empire
- Peru
- (Qing dynasty) Qing Empire
- Radical Civic Union
- Kingdom of Romania
- Russian Empire
- (Rattanakosin Kingdom (1782–1932)) Kingdom of Siam
- Sultanate of Zanzibar
- Beylik of Tunis
- United States

== Gallery ==
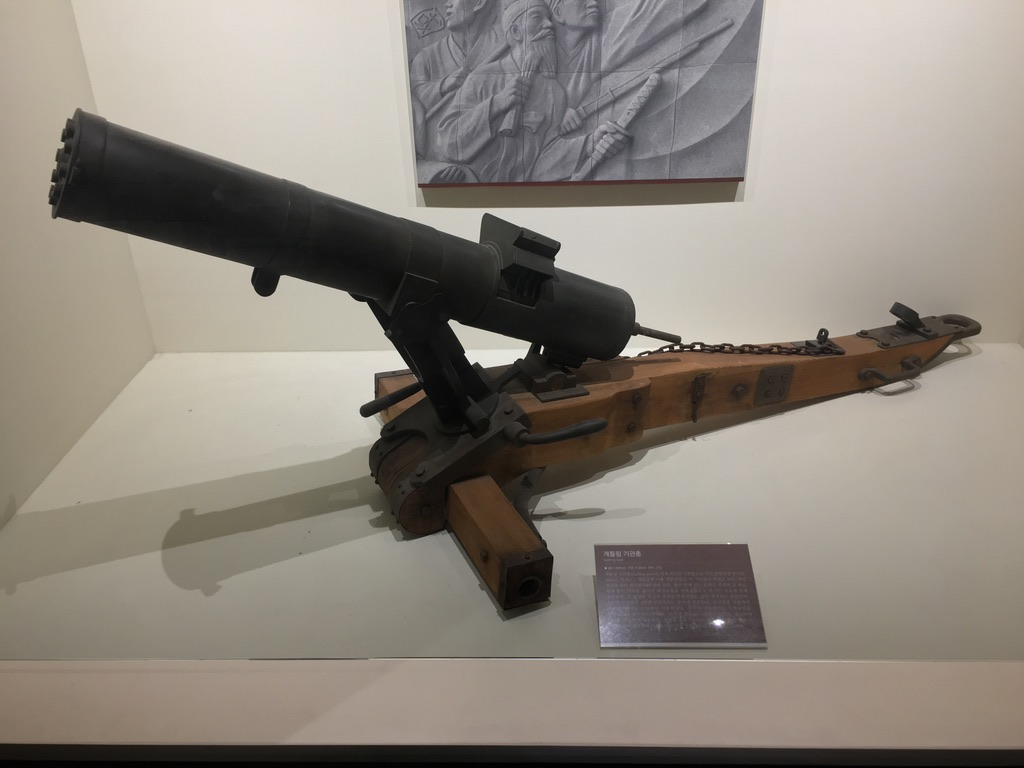
A Korean Gatling gun from the Donghak Peasant Revolution

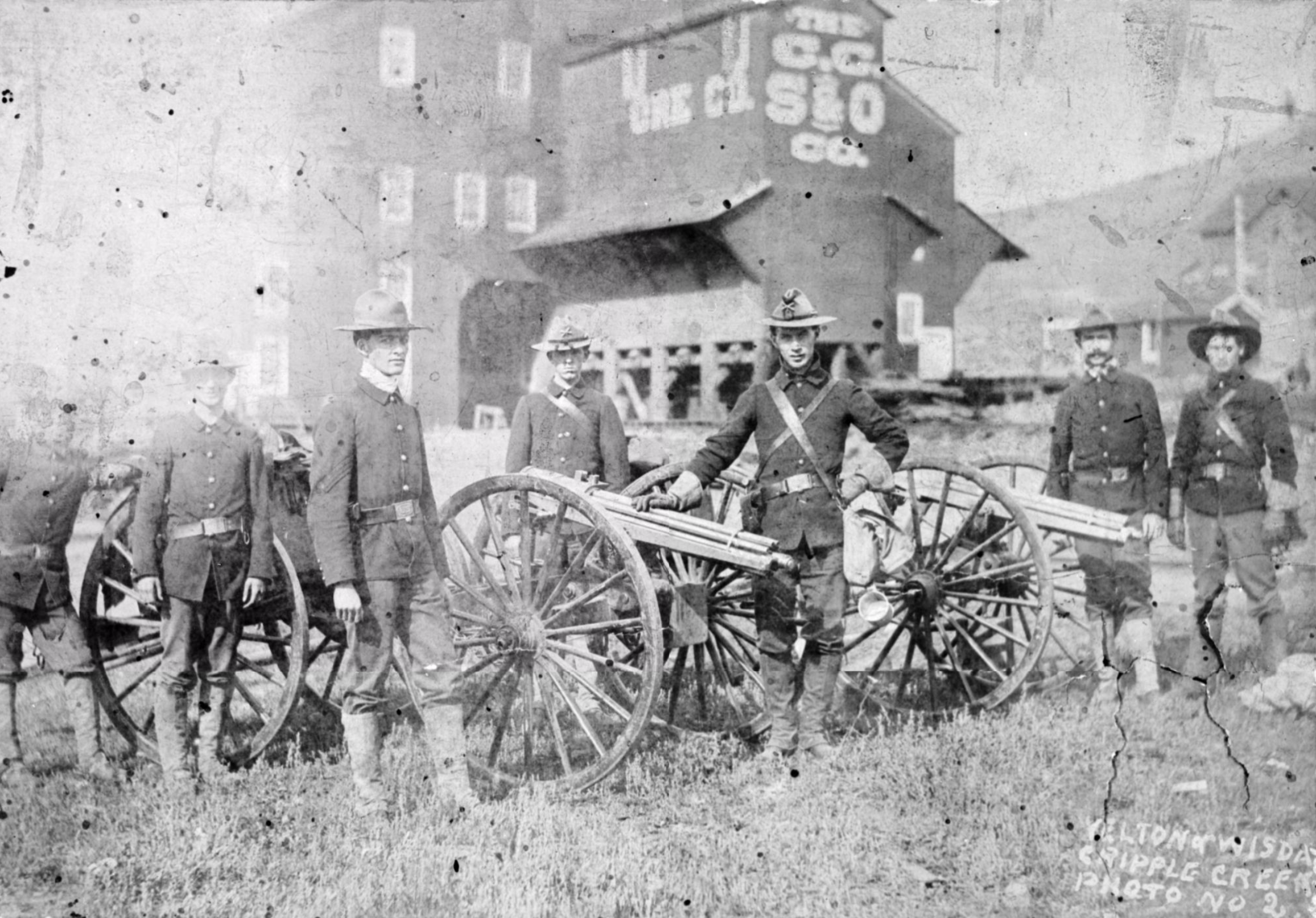
Colorado National Guard with Gatling guns during Colorado Labor Wars, 1904

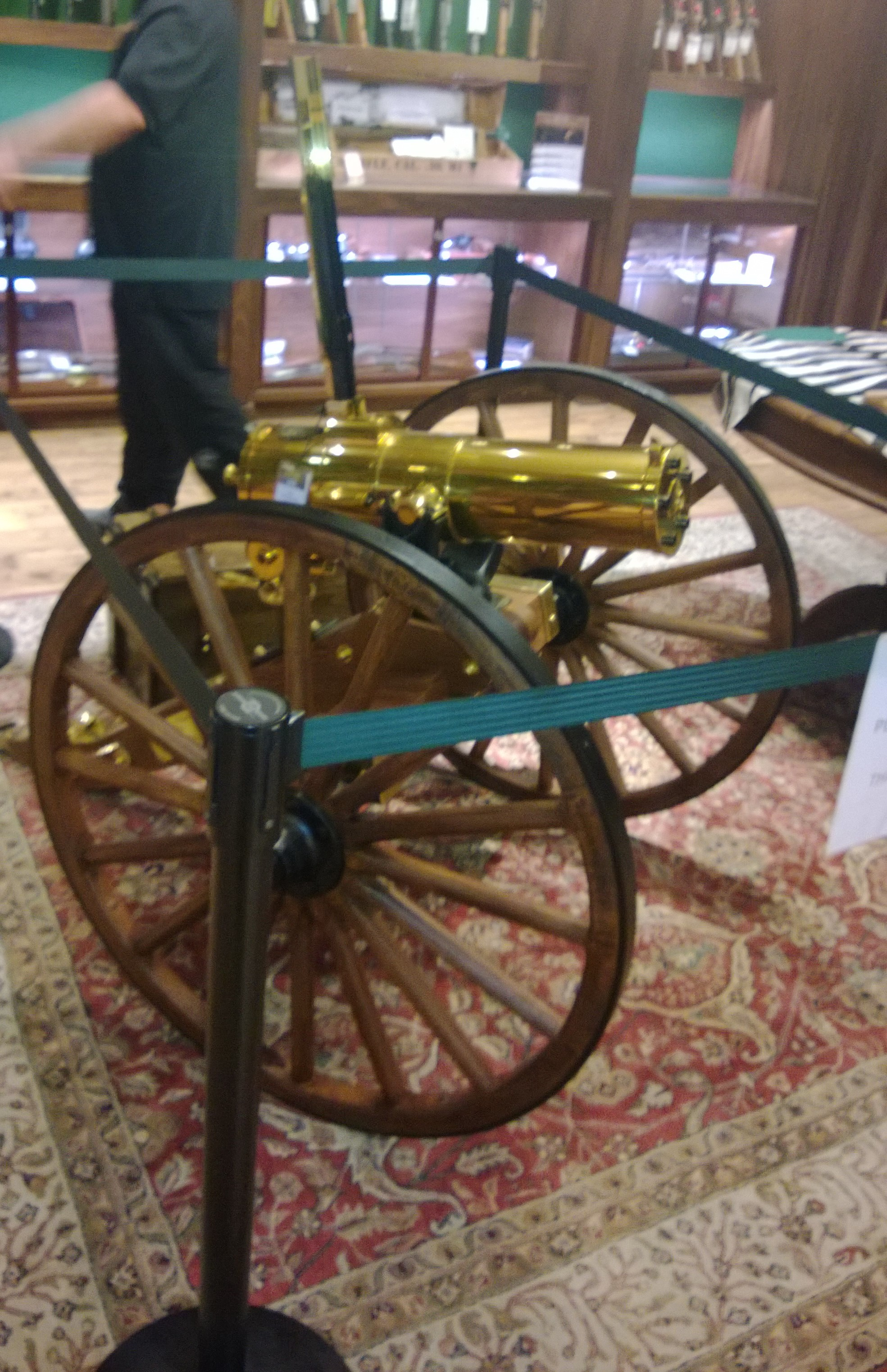
A modern reproduction of the Gatling gun

== See also ==
- Ripley machine gun – Early volley gun
- Gardner gun – Machine gun
- Hotchkiss revolving cannon – Guns from Hotchkiss arms company
- Bailey machine gun
- List of multiple barrel firearms
