= Arsenal Firearms AF2011A1 =

AF2011-A1
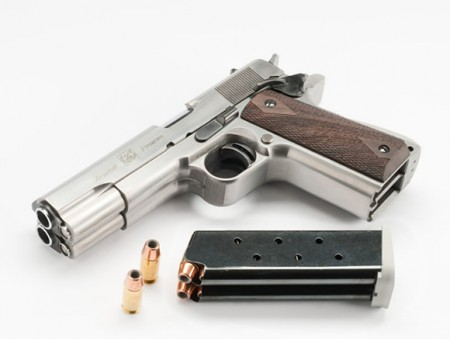
- Standard model AF2011A1 chambered in .45 ACP with fully loaded double magazine.
- Type: Semi-automatic pistol
- Place of origin: Italy

Production history
- Designer: Nicola Bandini
- Manufacturer: Arsenal Firearms
- Unit cost: $4,799 - $7,224 USD
- Produced: 2012–present
- Variants: Standard; Dueller; Dueller Prismatic

Specifications
- Mass: 1.85 kg for Standard; 2.00 kg for Dueller
- Length: 220 mm for Standard; 260 mm for Dueller
- Barrel length: 125 mm for Standard; 165 mm for Dueller
- Width: 50 mm for Dueller
- Height: 145 mm for Dueller
- Cartridge: .45 ACP.38 Super
- Action: Short recoil operation
- Feed system: Two 8-round detachable box magazines attached to a single base plate

The Arsenal Firearms AF2011-A1 is a double-barreled, semi-automatic pistol of Italian origin.

== History ==
The AF2011-A1 Double Barrel Pistol comes actually as the very first industrial double barrel semiautomatic pistol of all time. The original idea came about ten years back to Swiss armourer Vivian Mueller, who at the time experimented cutting and welding together multiple parts of the famous Sig P210: the result was a long slide, double barrel 9mm, highly decorated collector piece, which indeed shot very well. Our idea took the challenge further: to commemorate the legendary Colt 1911-A1 in the Centenary by making a true industrial market-ready double barrel .45 caliber pistol. We achieved success in the brief span of 6 months, after intense and round-the-clock 3D designing, stereolithographic modeling and parts machining.

— Arsenal Firearms AF2011 Description

The purpose of the AF2011A1 pistol is to increase the ballistic capability of .45 ACP without the need to develop a more powerful round.

The AF2011A1 has its roots in the Grieco pistol that also came with double barrels for the same purpose.

== Design ==
The AF2011-A1 is a double-barreled pistol based on the design of the M1911. It is practically two M1911 pistols built into a single side-by-side frame. Its barrels, triggers, magazines, and hammers all come in pairs, and are connected together so that pulling on one trigger would fire both barrels. The iron sights sit between the two barrels.

The majority of internal parts including the firing pins, firing pin plates, sear groups, springs, recoil rods, and mainspring housings are interchangeable with standard M1911 replacement parts.

== Cartridges ==
The available cartridges for the AF2011-A1 are:

- .45 ACP
- .38 Super

== Variants ==
As of September 2015 the AF2011 was available in three variants:

- Standard Model: A double-barreled pistol based on the M1911.
- Dueller: Has a 6.5-inch SUS416 stainless steel barrel, serrated slide, magnum beavertailed grip and custom trigger set.
- Dueller Prismatic: Has top external compensators, 45° side ambidextrous brake ports, 6.5-inch SUS416 stainless steel barrel, serrated slide, custom trigger set, magnum beavertailed grip safety and G10 tactical grips.

== In popular culture ==
=== Films ===
The AF2011-A1 is first seen in the (2013) film "My Name is Paul", A postapocalyptic version of the Apostle Paul. In 2014 it appeared in Intruders (TV series) used by a character (Richard Shepherd) played by James Frain.

It was later seen in the 2015 James Bond film Spectre. In the film the villain Mr. Hinx (Dave Bautista) is shown firing the weapon at Mr. Bond's plane leaving two distinct bullet holes in its side. Arsenal Firearms supplied five weapons which had to be specially modified to fire movie-blank rounds.

Also, the AF2011A1 is seen dual-wielded by Milla Jovovich as Alice in the trailer of Resident Evil: The Final Chapter.

In S3E19 of Gotham (TV series), Detective James Gordon is shown reloading the AF2011A1 while conversing with Harvey Bullock in the GCPD. The weapon also makes an appearance in Deadpool 2, being touted by Weasel.

=== Video games ===
The AF2011-A1 is featured in the videogame Killing Floor 2, as a perk weapon for the Gunslinger.

The game already has the original M1911 pistol, making the player able to dual wield both the single barrel and double barrel versions for "a total of 6 M1911s". It is also present in VR Gun club.

This weapon also appeared in Counter-Strike Online 2 and Phantom Forces on Roblox.

=== Miculek video ===
In May 2015 American professional speed and competition shooter Jerry Miculek uploaded a video of himself firing two .45 ACP AF2011A1 pistols simultaneously.

In the video, Miculek can be seen firing 20 rounds in 1.5 seconds.

The video quickly went viral and was featured in a number of firearms and general news publications.

As of October 2018 the video has generated over 11 million views making it the most viewed video in Miculek's YouTube channel.
