= FDM L4/L5 =

L4/L5
- Type: Multiple-barrel firearm
- Place of origin: United States

Production history
- Designer: Martin Grier
- Designed: 2018

Specifications
- Mass: 6.5 lbs
- Caliber: 6mm
- Action: Electronic
- Feed system: 4 or 5-round charge blocks

The L4 and L5, also called the Ribbon Gun, is a prototype, caseless, multi-bore selective fire rifle with an electronic firing system. The firearm was designed and built by Martin Grier, of Forward Defense Munitions, based in Colorado Springs, spending $500,000 in development. In 2018, the U.S. Army requested a prototype for testing as a potential replacement for the M16 rifle.
