= Onorati SMG =

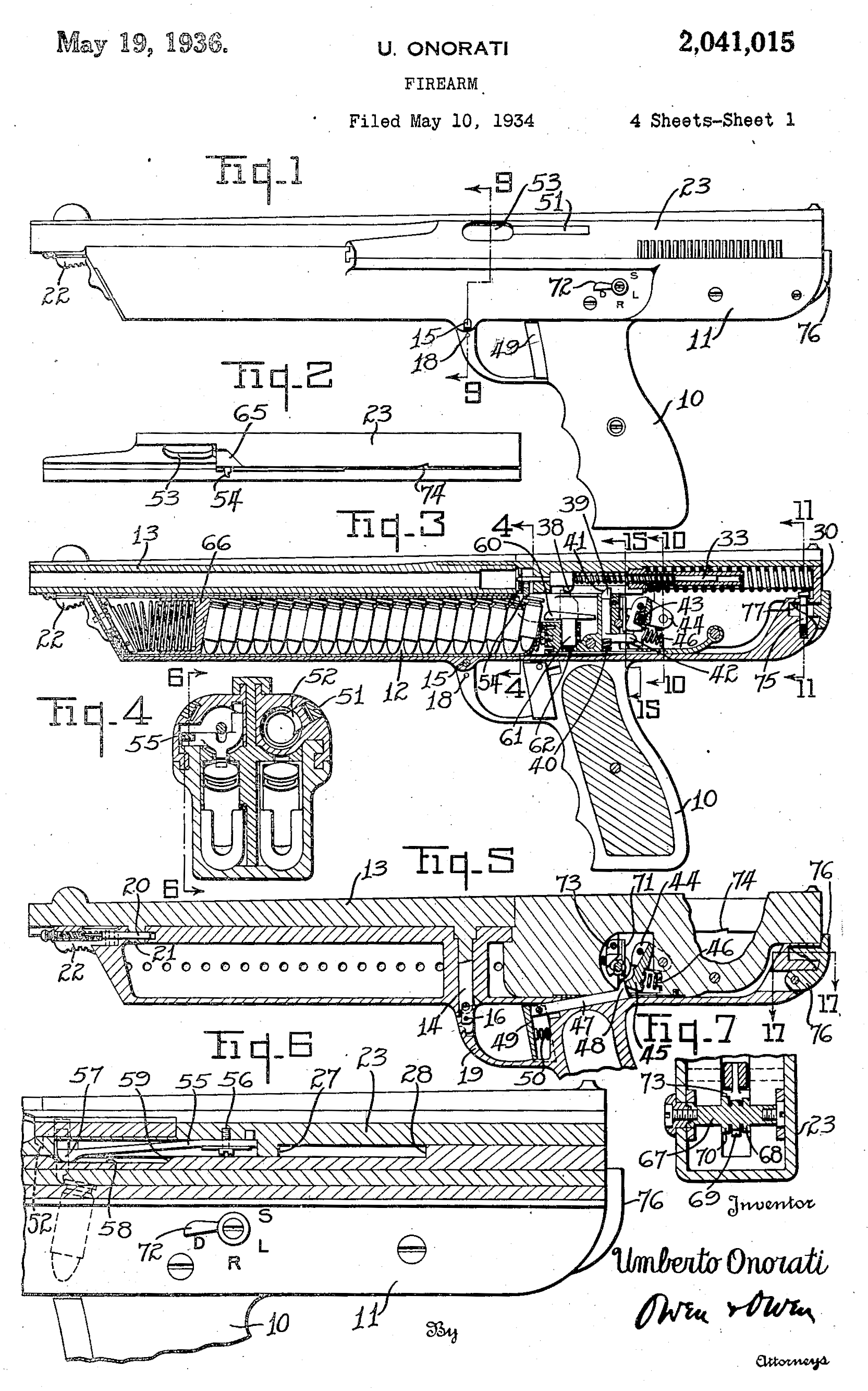
- Blueprints sheet
- Type: Submachine gun, machine pistol
- Place of origin: Italy

Production history
- Designer: Umberto Onorati
- Designed: 1936, 1938

Specifications
- Caliber: 9×19mm Parabellum
- Action: Blowback
- Feed system: 2 20-round detachable box magazines

The Onorati SMG is a two-barrel Italian prototype submachine gun. A pistol calibre rifle variant also existed.

== Design details ==
The weapon was designed by Umberto Onorati; very little other information about the weapon is available. As no pictures of the weapon exist, it can be assumed that the weapon never advanced past prototype stages. The Onorati used a dual-bolt system and fed from two 20-round detachable box magazines inserted into the weapon.

== Variants ==
SMG

The standard SMG with a wood stock; magazines are inserted into the weapon and stored under the handguard.

Pistol

A machine pistol variant of the same weapon, which has a normal pistol grip instead of a stock acting as a grip.
