= Weatherby Orion =

- Type: Over-Under Double Barrel Shotgun

Production history
- Manufacturer: Weatherby
- Produced: 2014-Present
- Variants: Orion I

Specifications
- Mass: 7 lbs

The Weatherby Orion is a Boxlock Over-Under Double Barrel Shotgun with a solid steel receiver.
