= Double-Barreled Wheellock Pistol Made for Emperor Charles V =

Pistol

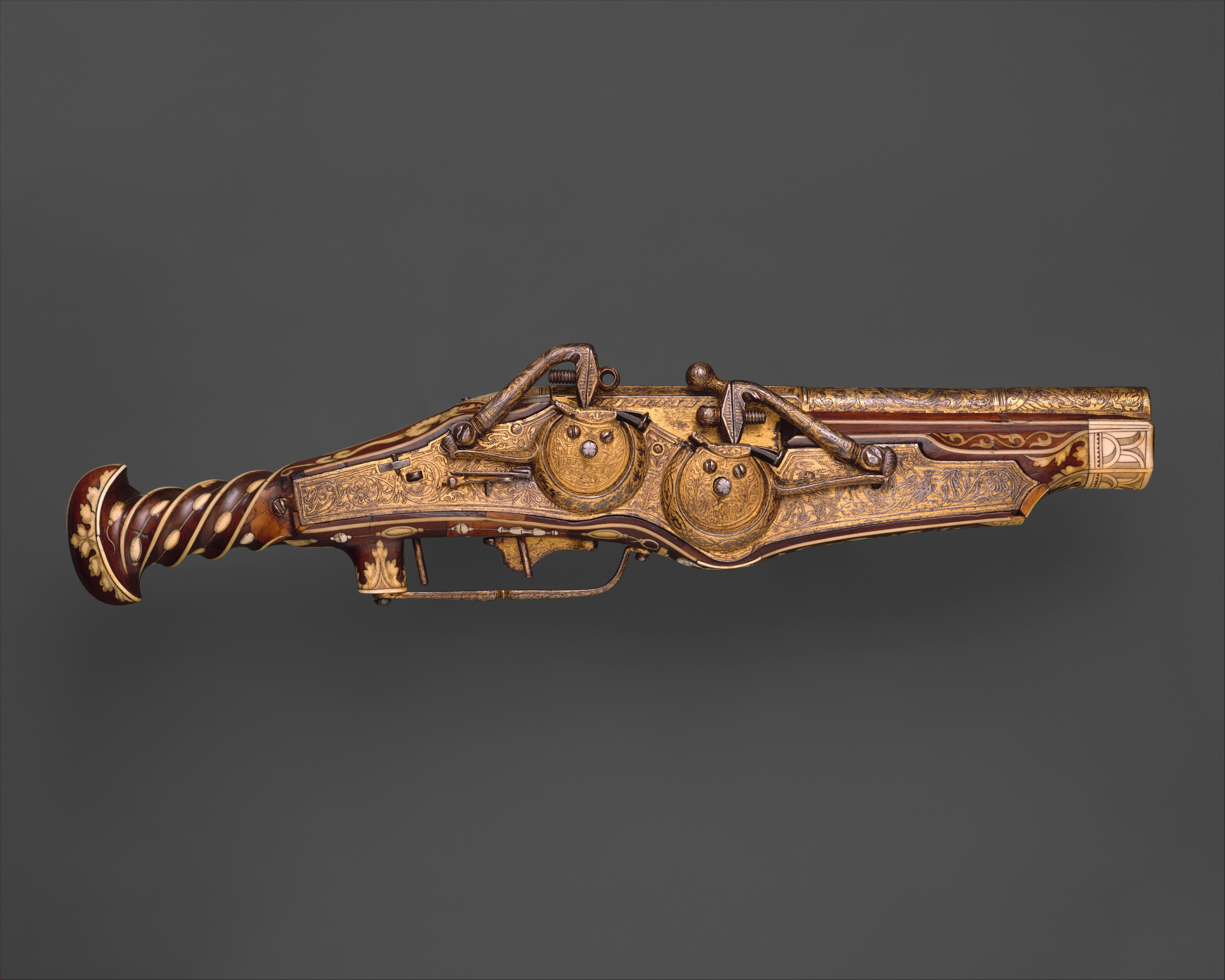
- Artist: Peter Peck; Ambrosius Gemlich
- Year: 1540–45
- Medium: Steel, ivory, cherry wood, staghorn
- Dimensions: 49.2 cm (19.4 in)
- Location: Metropolitan Museum of Art

A double-barreled wheellock pistol was crafted by German gunsmith Peter Peck for Charles V in 1540. It is one of the oldest surviving European pistols. It is in the collection of the Metropolitan Museum of Art.

== Description ==
The pistol was made by gunsmith Peter Peck of Munich for Emperor Charles V, a noted firearms enthusiast. The .46 caliber double-barreled pistol fires via the use of two wheellock mechanisms, one for each barrel; these were commonly used in custom-made firearms of the day, as while wheellocks were more expensive they were considered more reliable than early flintlock mechanisms or matchlocks. The pistol's wheellocks are noted as being particularly precise, as Peck worked as a watchmaker in addition to being a gunsmith. While it was mused that Charles commissioned a pistol with two barrels and two wheellocks as befitting his status as the sovereign of two empires (Charles V was emperor of both Spain and the Holy Roman Empire), similarly-dated firearms from Bavaria also employ a double wheellock firing action.

In terms of aesthetics, the 5 lb. 10 oz pistol is elaborately decorated; the pistol's cherry wood stock is inlaid with ivory and staghorn, its metalwork is engraved and sheaved in gold, while the gun's grip is intricately carved. The bodywork of the gun is stamped with a double headed eagle (Charles' symbol as Holy Roman Emperor) and an image of the Pillars of Hercules, a symbol of the Crown of Spain. The weapon is inscribed with the Latin motto Plus ultra (More beyond), which is the national motto of the Kingdom of Spain. On the reverse side from the two wheellocks, the ivory inlay of the gun has been carved away to form a relief image of hunters and hunting dogs chasing game. The gun's decoration was executed by German gunsmith Ambrosius Gemlich.

== Gallery ==
Double-Barreled Wheellock Pistol Made for Emperor Charles V

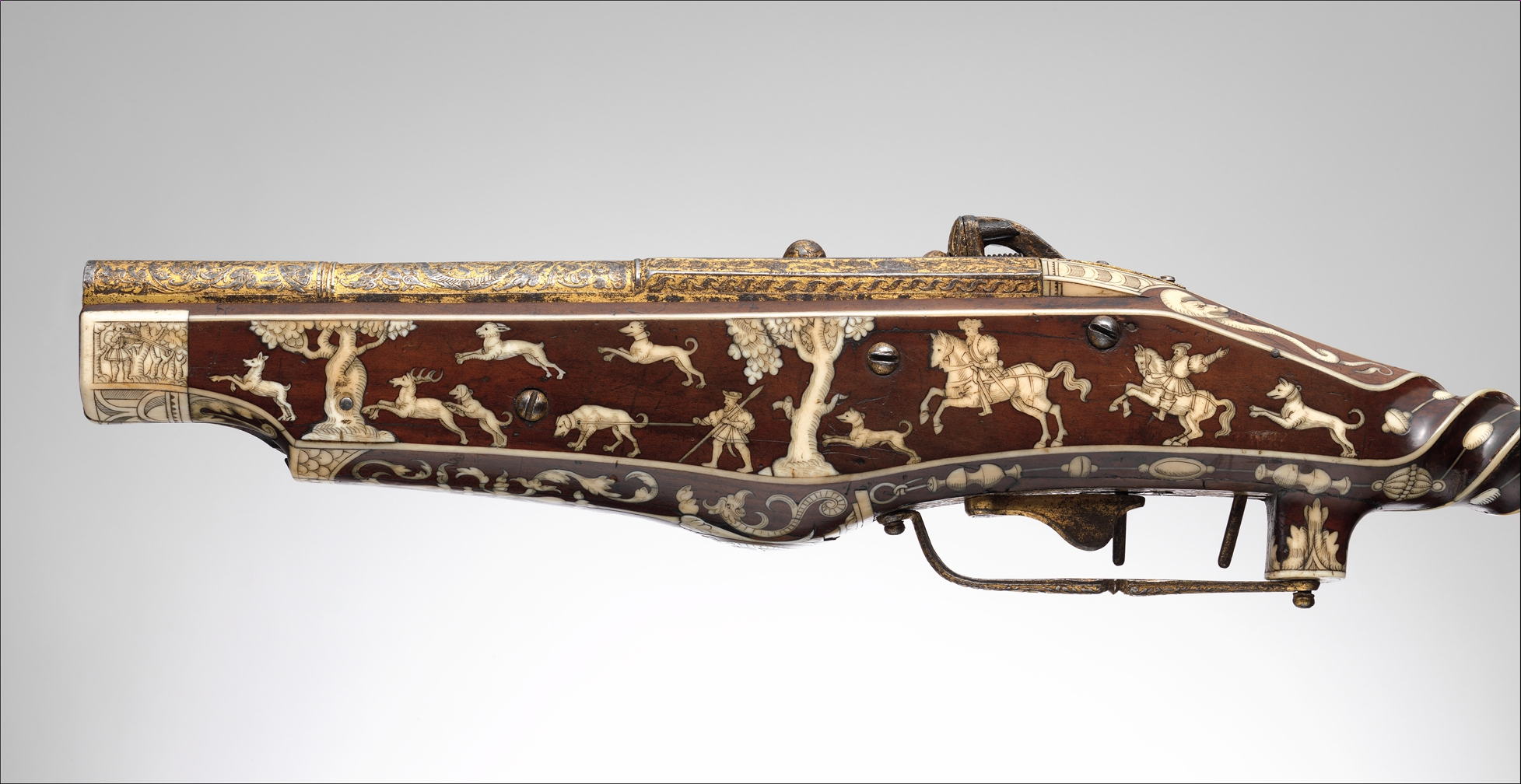
Relief image of hunters and their dogs pursuing game. Done in cherry wood with ivory inlay.

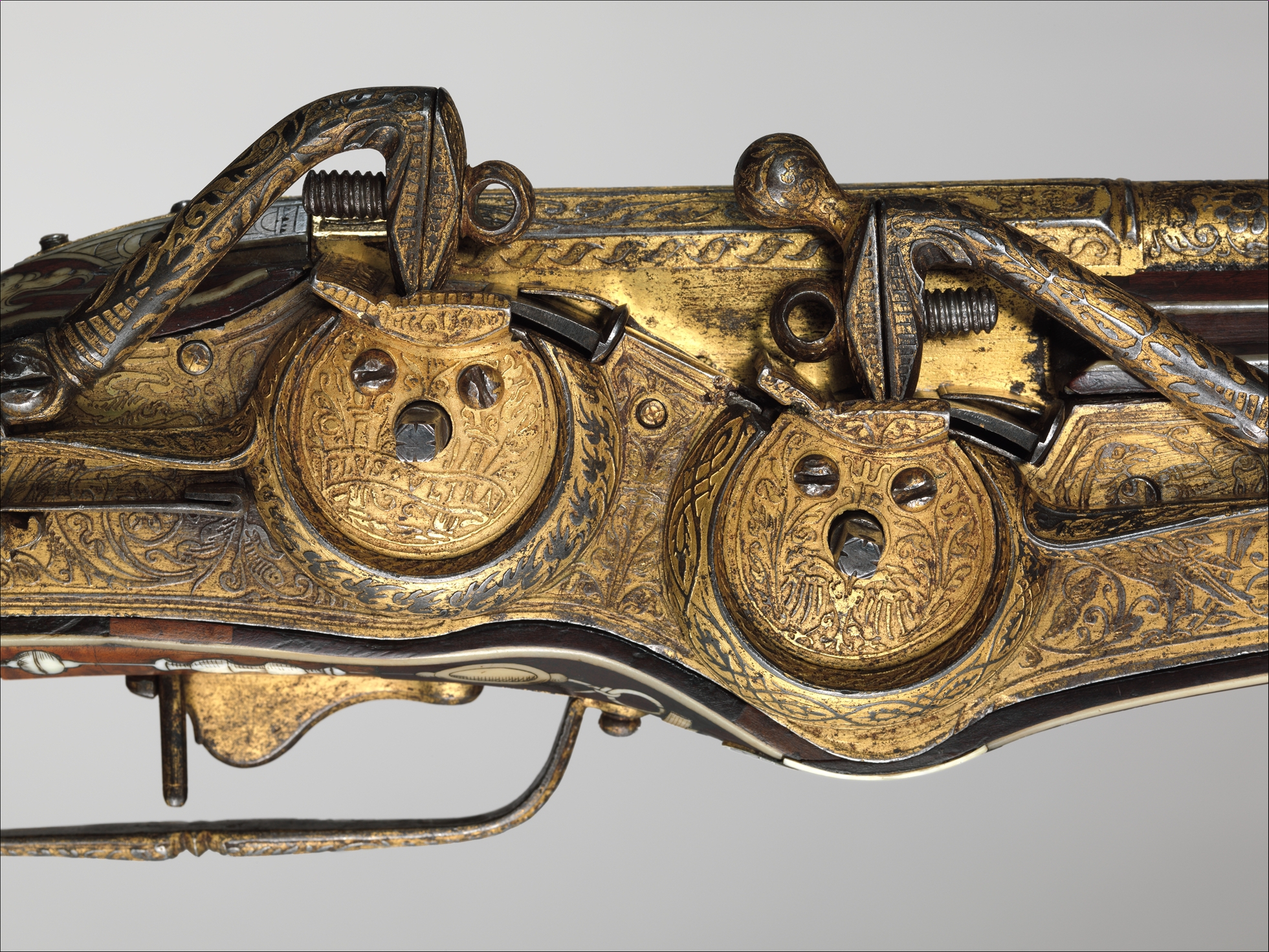
Close-up image of the weapon's rotating wheels.

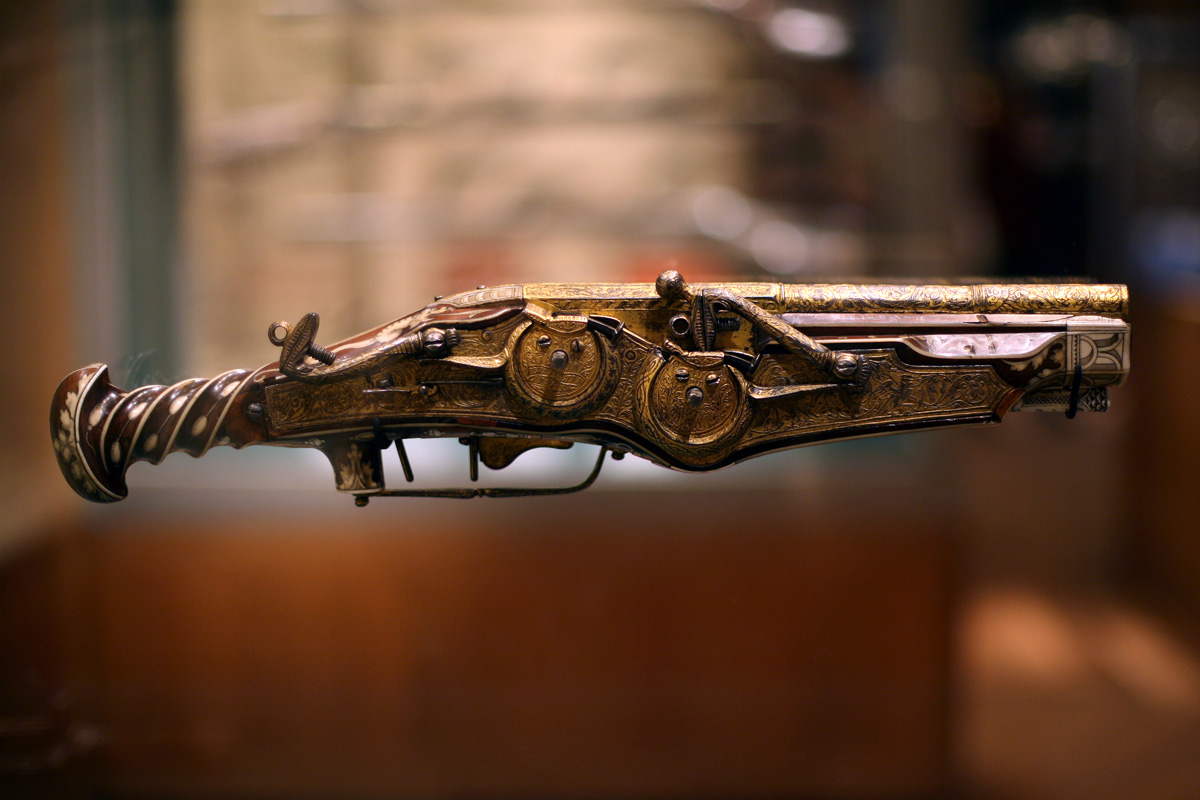
Pistol in its display case at the Metropolitan Museum of Art.
