= Type-90 cluster munition =

Chinese cluster munition

The Type-90, also known as the MZD-2, is a Chinese submunition used in the 122 mm Type-81 cluster rocket. It is made by Norinco. Type-81 rockets with Type-90 submunitions were used by Hezbollah against Israel in the 2006 Lebanon War, and they have been used in the Syrian Civil War as bombs dropped by weaponized Hezbollah quadcopters.

Each Type-90 resembles a small cylindrical bell with a ribbon at one end. A plastic band full of 3mm steel spheres wraps horizontally around the middle of the cylinder. Inside is an armor-piercing shaped charge. Each Type-81 rocket contains 39 Type-90 submunitions.
