= Standard Manufacturing =

American firearms manufacturer

- Type: Privately held
- Founded: 2011; 15 years ago
- Headquarters: New Britain, Connecticut, US
- Key people: Louis Frutuoso, president
- Products: Firearms
- Parent: Connecticut Shotgun Manufacturing Company
- Website: stdgun.com

Standard Manufacturing, LLC. is an American firearms manufacturer based in New Britain, Connecticut. The company was founded in 2014 by Louis Frutuoso. It serves as a subsidiary to Connecticut Shotgun Manufacturing Company, a manufacturer, repairer, and distributor of shotguns and related products.

Standard Mfg. produces shotguns, single action revolvers, double action revolvers, semi-automatic pistols, semi-automatic rifles, and various parts. Standard Mfg. continues to become a rising firearm manufacturer in the state of the Connecticut. It became recognized for such firearms such as designing and manufacturing the DP-12, a 12-gauge double-barreled pump shotgun, and the Switch Gun, a .22 WMR folding single-action revolver.

== History ==
Standard Manufacturing was founded by Louis M. Frutuoso in 2014 as a subsidiary to Connecticut Shotgun Manufacturing Company. Connecticut Shotgun was manufacturing, repairing, and distributing high-end shotguns and sports-related products. To branch out into the industry, Standard Mfg. was created as a separate name to serve to new demographic. Standard Manufacturing debuted in the industry with the release of the DP-12, a 12-gauge double-barreled pump shotgun. The shotgun immediately caught recognition from consumers with its ability to fire two rounds with one pump of the shotgun. It would eventually go on to become one of Standard's most successful products, winning the 2015 Blue Book of Gun Values Top 10 Firearms Industry Award and 2016 NRA Golden Bullseye Award. The release of the SKO-12, a 12-gauge gas-operated, magazine-fed semi-automatic shotgun was Standard's next entry into the shotgun market. This would eventually lead to the production of the SKO Shorty and SKO Mini, which are both shortened versions of the SKO semi-automatic platform.

Taking advantage of the 100,000 sq ft of manufacturing space, Standard Mfg. started making its own AR receivers in-house with eventually developed into the production of AR-15-style rifles. They debuted in 2016 in multiple different models, such as making a CT-exclusive rifle along with five different models (Model A, B, C, D, E). As of today, Standard Mfg. lower receivers continue to be a top product for consumers.

Having many former Colt and U.S. Firearms employees, Standard Mfg. decided to break out further with the production of their own version of the classic 1911 and Single Action Revolver. Standard started out selling these revolvers as color case hardened done in-house, the reception of single-action fans and appraisers was so great that it led to the production of nickel-plated Single Action revolvers. In 2023, there was the recent release of the "Sheriff's Model", an ejector less single-action revolver based on the shopkeeper. Standard has produced various models of this 1911 in Case Colored and Blued, along with their own tactical-based 1911 HPX model and military-based 1911A1 model.

2019 was a major year for the company with the debut of the S333 Thunderstruck. First presented at SHOT Show 2017 as a pepper-box style pocket pistol, and later developed into a double-action, double-barreled revolver in 2019. The gun received immediate attention for its particular ergonomic design and the ability to fire two .22 Winchester magnum rounds with one pull of the trigger. Throughout the 2020 pandemic, Standard Mfg. would have an influx in sales which lead to the eventual releases of the G4S, a .22LR semi-automatic rifle and the SP-12, a 12ga ambidextrous, bottom ejecting, pump-action shotgun in 2021. Gaston J. Glock Style, LP. had also been purchase by Standard Mfg. in the same year. In 2022, Standard Mfg. would catch more viral attention from consumers with the debut of the Switch Gun, a .22WMR folding single-action revolver. As of 2023, it has become one of Standard Mfg.'s best received and sold firearms and also being sold in .22LR.

2023 has led to the official debuts of the Jackhammer .22LR semi-automatic pistol, S333 Gen III double-action, double-barreled two-shot revolver, and "Sherriff's Model" shopkeeper-style .45LC single-action revolver.

== Products ==
Product names in italics are no longer listed on the company's website.

=== Pistols ===
- Jackhammer - a .22 semi-automatic target pistol based on the Thompson submachine gun.
- Standard 1911 – a version of the .45 ACP M1911 pistol
- S333 Thunderstruck – a .22 WMR double-barreled personal defense revolver firing two rounds per trigger pull.
- Standard Single Action Revolver – a version of the Colt Single Action Army
- Switch-Gun™ - a self-defense .22 Magnum revolver that can fold its grip.
- SG22 - a .22LR semi-automatic pistol based on the Colt Woodsman.
- SG9 - a 9mm semi-automatic pistol.

=== Rifles ===
- G4S – a semi-automatic .22 caliber version of the Thompson submachine gun.
- STD-15 - a variant of the AR-15 available in multiple models and calibers.

=== Shotguns ===
- DP-12 – a 12-gauge double-barreled pump shotgun.
- SKO – a 12-gauge shotgun variant of the AR-15.
- SP-12- an ambidextrous pump-action 12-gauge shotgun.
