= FN SC-1 =

- Type: Over-Under Double Barrel Shotgun

Production history
- Manufacturer: FN Herstal

Specifications
- Mass: 8.2 lbs
- Length: 46.38 in

The FN SC-1 is an over-under double-barreled shotgun designed for sport.
