= Standard Manufacturing DP-12 =

DP-12
- Type: Bullpup pump-action shotgun
- Place of origin: United States

Production history
- Manufacturer: Standard Manufacturing
- Unit cost: US$1,395.00–1,495.00 (MSRP)
- Produced: 2015–present

Specifications
- Mass: 9.3 lb (4.2 kg)
- Length: 29.5 in (75 cm)
- Height: 7 in (18 cm)
- Cartridge: 12 gauge (2 3/4" or 3" shells)
- Caliber: 12 gauge
- Barrels: 2
- Action: Pump action with two shots from single trigger, inline shell feeding
- Effective firing range: 22.9 m (20 yards)
- Feed system: 7+7+2 (2 3/4") or 6+6+2 (3") dual internal tube
- Sights: Iron sights are not standard, Picatinny rails for accessories like flip up iron AR-15-style backup sights and red dot reflex sights

The DP-12 is a bullpup 12-gauge pump action double-barreled shotgun designed by Standard Manufacturing. It has two underbarrel tube magazines, each of which feeds its own barrel. Each magazine tube can hold up to 7 2.75-inch (70 mm) 12-gauge shotshells or 6 3-inch (76 mm) shotgun shells; 16 (2 3/4") or 14 (3") in total with indicator windows.

== Design ==
The DP-12 shotgun is a manually operated, pump action weapon. The first trigger pull fires the right barrel and the second fires the left. The sliding forend is connected to the bolt by dual operating bars. Ammunition is fed from 2x independent magazine tubes, located below the barrels.

Rounds are loaded into the magazines through a large loading/ejection port, located at the bottom rear of the gun in the stock, behind the pistol grip. Empty shells are ejected down through the same port. The safety is an ambidextrous AR style lever located above the grip.

Sighting equipment is not included, but iron sights and/or a red dot sight can be installed using the standard Picatinny rail located above the barrels. A second Picatinny rail at the end of the slide (under the muzzles) can be used for a forward grip or other accessories.

=== Chokes ===
The barrels come threaded with a Tru-Choke thread pattern and 2x flush-mount spreader choke tubes. There are 2x optional chokes from the manufacturer, the doorbuster tactical choke and stiletto choke.

=== Colors ===
There are several different color variants of this shotgun. They include black, flat-dark earth, green, tan, gold and black & gold two-tone.

== See also ==
- List of multiple-barrel firearms
