= Flash-ball =

Flash-Ball
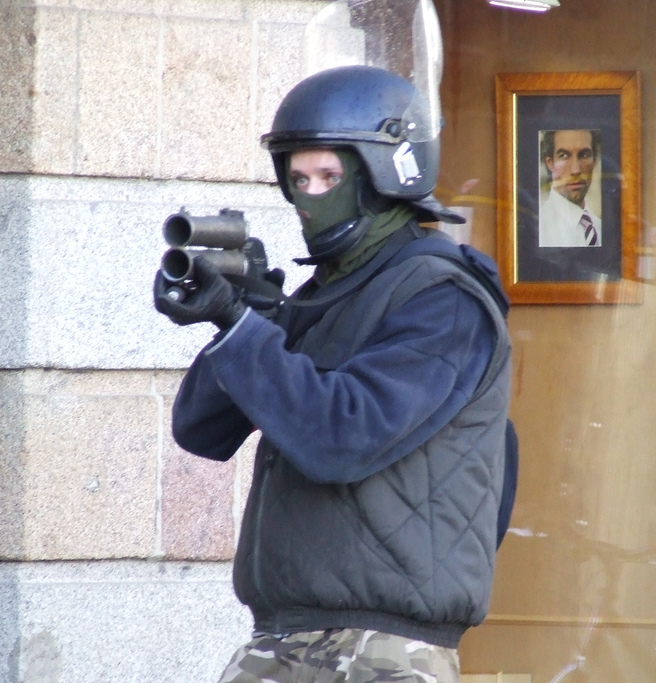
- A French policeman holding a flash-ball launcher
- Type: Less-lethal launcher
- Place of origin: France

Production history
- Designed: 1990
- Manufacturer: Verney-Carron
- Produced: 1995–present
- Variants: Side-by-side; Over-and-under

Specifications
- Cartridge: 44×83 mm
- Caliber: 44 mm
- Barrels: 2
- Action: Striker fired
- Rate of fire: Double-action
- Sights: Iron

Flash-Ball is a registered trademark for a less-lethal hand-held projectile launcher developed by French hunting firearms manufacturer Verney-Carron. Flash-Ball is intended to be used by riot police as an alternative to lethal firearms, bean bag rounds and plastic bullets.

== Characteristics ==
The weapon exists in two versions of calibre 44/83. The super-pro version features vertically stacked barrels and is made from metal alloys, while the compact version is made from lighter composite materials with the twin barrels side by side. Both versions of the weapon can be used to fire a variety of ammunition although a soft 44 mm rubber ball is the most common.

According to the manufacturer's own publicity, the Flash-Ball's standard round has the stopping power of a 9 mm calibre handgun but considerably less kinetic energy per square centimetre, making it unlikely to penetrate the body of a normally clothed person even at ranges down to 5 metres (5.5 yd).

Various human rights groups have expressed fears that the widespread deployment of such weapons could result in police being less likely to apply de-escalation tactics when dealing with potentially dangerous situations.

== Safety concerns ==
Numerous eye losses, comas, and brain traumas as well as major bone breakages and two deaths due to cardiac arrest have been attributed to the use of Flash-Ball by police.

== Users ==
- France: Law enforcement in France
- Macau: Grupo de Operações Especiais (Special Operations Group) of Macau Police
- Portugal: Public Security Police
- Indonesia: Indonesian National Police

== See also ==
- Blast ball
