= Baylè 1879 wallet / palm pistol =

- Type: Pistol
- Place of origin: France

Production history
- Designed: 1879

Specifications
- Barrels: 6 Vertically
- Action: Double-action
- Sights: Iron

The Baylè Pistol was a six barrel pistol of French origin introduced in 1879. The barrels were stacked vertically and firing was actuated with a double-action trigger mechanism firing each round at a time.
