= Verney-Carron =

French firearm manufacturing company

Verney-Carron S.A.
- Company type: public limited company
- Traded as: Euronext: MLVER
- Industry: Arms
- Founded: 1820; 206 years ago
- Founder: Claude Verney-Carron
- Headquarters: Saint-Etienne, France
- Products: Firearms
- Website: www.verney-carron.com

Verney-Carron S.A. is a French firearm manufacturing company based in Saint-Etienne, Auvergne-Rhône-Alpes. The company makes a wide range of hunting shotguns and rifles. In 2004, Verney-Carron purchased the traditional artisan gun making company Demas, forming the L'Atelier Verney-Carron brand of antique firearms.

Although more well known in France than the rest of Europe or North America, export of their firearms to South America and parts of Europe is not uncommon. Verney-Carron also notably designs and produce the "Flash-ball" less lethal rubber bullet gun widely used by French riot control police forces since 2000.

== History ==
The company was founded in 1820 by gunmaker Claude Verney (1800–1870), who came from a family of prominent gunsmiths since 1650, and at the age of 20 won first prize in an armory competition (French: Concours d'Armurerie) held by the City of Saint-Etienne. He later in 1830 married Antoinette Carron, the daughter of another gunsmith family, and changed the name of his business to Verney-Carron. When Claude Verney died in 1870, his eldest son Jean (1839–1916) took over the business with his brothers, and the company was named Verney-Carron Frères (brothers) before restored to the old name by Jean's son Claude (1868–1941) in 1917 after Jean's death.

At the end of the First World War, Verney-Carron assimilated the employees and equipment of another manufacturer Auguste Marze in 1926, creating the new Verney-Carron S.A. The great crash of 1929 and the economic depression that followed caused the company to gradually changeover from a direct sales operation into a manufacturing company selling through a network of firearms retailers. Starting in 1936, Verney-Carron diversified by adding fishing and tennis equipment distribution as well as bicycle manufacturing to its business portfolio, which helped the company to survive the difficult years of the Second World War.

At the end of World War II, the company rebuilt by assembling six manufacturers, under the name Groupement d'Exploitation des Fabricants d'Armes Réunis (GEFAR). Despite competition from the national arsenals, over 150,000 firearms were manufactured, most of them under the brand name "Pionnier" ("pioneer"). In 1954, the company signed the license with a little known Italian manufacturer, which had just completed the development of a very light semi-automatic hunting shotgun, to manufacture the product, marking a new turning point of Verney-Carron entering into the era of modern industrial production.

In 1963, Verney-Carron absorbed SIFARM, a combination of the venerable manufacturers Berthon Frères, Francisque Darne, Didier-Drevet, Gerest and Ronchard-Cizeron, along with the famous barrel maker Jean Breuil. The Sagittaire, the first mass-produced French over-and-under shotgun, was brought out in 1966 and immediately became a real market leader, and production doubled from 1970 to 1975. However, the company closing down the facilities at Cours Fauriel to concentrate operations at the mechanical workshops of Boulevard Thiers during a very difficult period followed up to the 1980s. During this period, Verney-Carron won the contract for the manufacture of sub-assemblies for FAMAS, the new assault rifle for the French Army. This arrangement lasted over ten years and contributed to total renovation of the company's quality control, and allowed Verney-Carron to expand steadily in a continually depressed market.

In 1985, an over & under Sagittaire with a light alloy receiver was introduced, and was an immediate success that ensured the Sagittaire's retaining its No. 1 market position. Three years later in 1988, the new Super 9 was introduced in the "Trap" model, and was followed by many others, notably the "Plume" ("featherweight") model in 1993. The Super 9 gradually replaced the older Sagittaire line, but one model, the "Double Express", was introduced in 1989, which, added to the "Impact" rifle, improved the sales of rifled firearms. A new Sagittaire model called the "Nouvelle Technologie" was introduced in 1994, and was lauded by the whole hunting press and enthusiastically taken up by hunters.

In 1990, the marketing of a brand new defensive weapon called the "Flash-Ball" started, and has since been adopted by several police and law enforcement agencies. In 1999, a new Flash-Ball intended for the security sector, called the "Super Pro", would slowly become one of the basic weapons for the French National Police and is pending to be equipped by the Municipal Police. A new bolt-action rifle, the Impact Plus, came out in 1996. In 2000, the Impact Auto carbine, the first and only automatic hunting carbine manufactured in France, was launched building on the success of the Impact Plus.

On 11 February 2025, the company has declared insolvency and requested judicial reorganization. On 13 February 2025, the Saint-Étienne Commercial Court authorised the opening of a receivership procedure for Verney-Carron, aiming to secure its future. The company, which suffered a €4.54 million loss in 2023, is in discussions with a major arms manufacturer, reportedly the Belgian FN Browning Group.

== Products ==
=== Rifles ===
==== Break action ====
- Sagittaire and SagittaireXS series

==== Manual repeating ====
- Impact Plus series – bolt action (discontinued)
- Impact LA series – pump action
- SpeedLine – lever-release rotating bolt short-stroke gas piston

==== Semi-automatic ====
- Impact NT series

==== Air rifle ====
- VC'R

=== Shotguns ===
==== Break action ====
- SOLO – single-barrel
- Vercar
- Sagittaire series
- Super 9 series

==== Manual repeating ====
- P12 – rifled pump action
- Véloce – lever-release blowback

==== Semi-automatic ====
- Impact series
- Matrix series
- V12N
