= Ripley machine gun =

Early volley gun

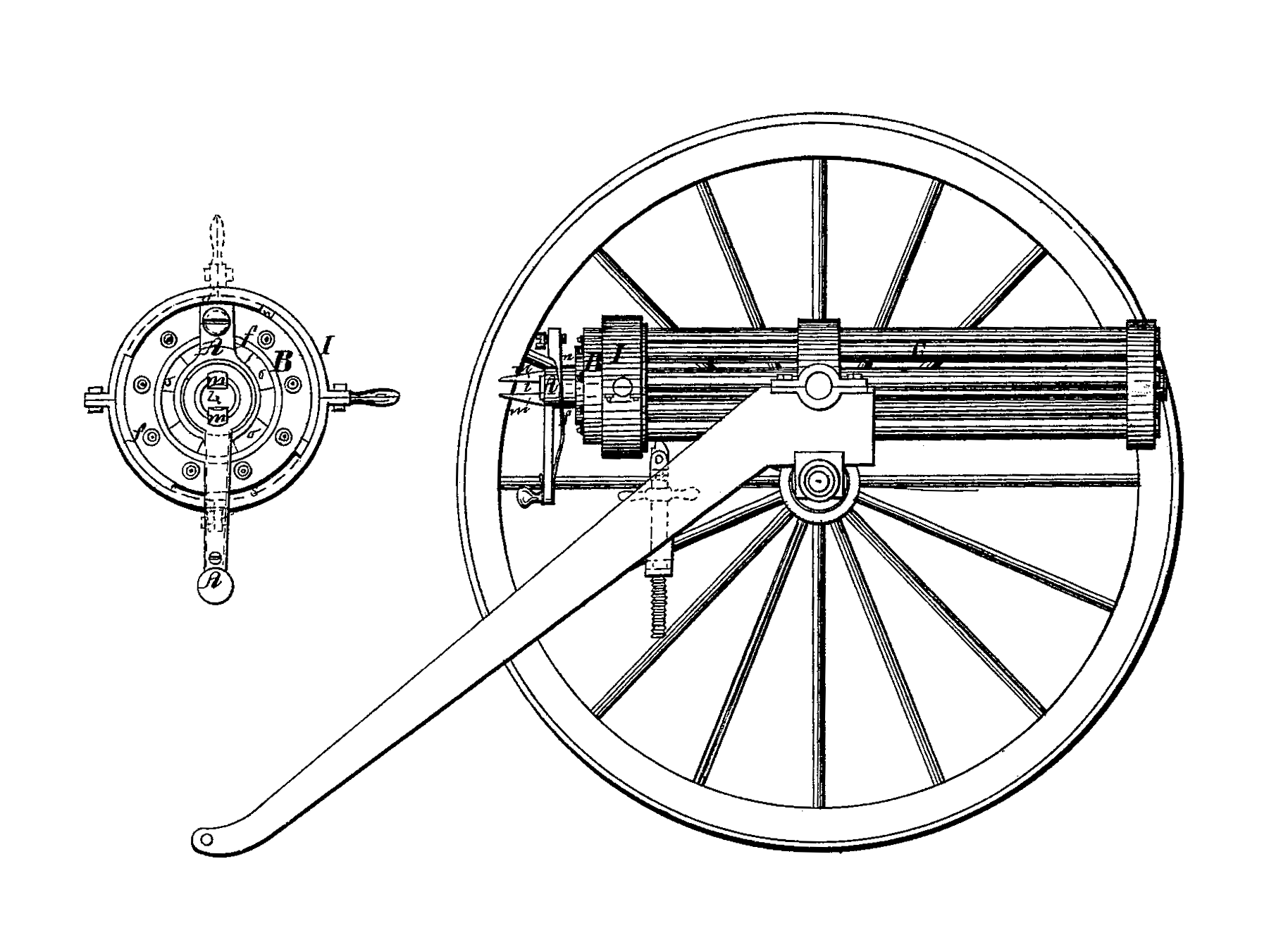
A patent image of the gun showing the carriage arrangement and operating handle.

The Ripley Machine Gun was a volley gun, an early precursor of the machine gun, which was patented in 1861 by Ezra Ripley. Although it is likely that it was never actually produced, it demonstrated a number of basic concepts that were employed in the design of the Gatling Gun that was patented the following year.

== Method of action ==
The design, as patented, consists of nine fixed barrels attached to a limbers and caissons. The weapon was loaded with a cylinder containing nine rounds of ammunition, arranged so that the rounds lined up with the barrels of the weapon. A firing handle was then attached, which locked the cylinder into place.

The weapon was fired by rotating the handle, with the barrels firing in sequence. By rotating the handle quickly a high rate of fire could be achieved, or slowly, single shots. Once the nine rounds of ammunition in the chamber were expended, the cylinder could be removed for reloading and a fresh cylinder could be inserted into the breech.

The weapon was probably never built, and was passed over in favor of volley guns like the Billinghurst Requa Battery.
