= Nambu Type 90 =

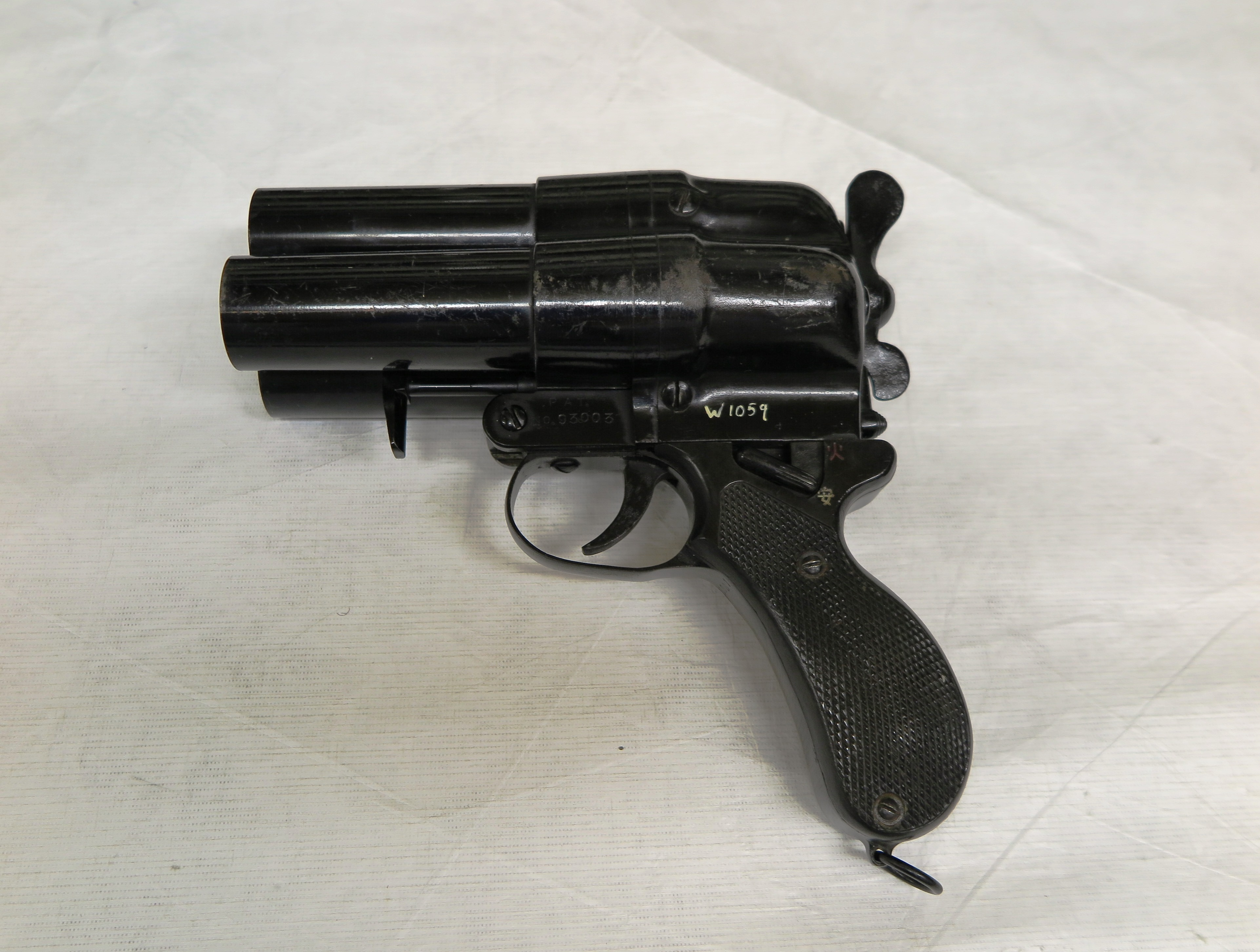
- Nambu Type 90 triple barrel flare pistol
- Type: Flare pistol
- Place of origin: Empire of Japan

Service history
- Wars: World War II; Vietnam War

Production history
- Manufacturer: Nambu
- Produced: 1930–1944/1945
- Variants: 2 Barrel Variant; 3 Barrel Variant

Specifications
- Cartridge: 28 x 90mm (White, Red, Yellow, Green or Blue flare); 28 x 94mm (Black smoke)
- Caliber: 28mm (1.1-inch)
- Barrels: 2 or 3
- Action: Striker-fired
- Feed system: Breech-loaded
- Sights: Iron sights

The Nambu Type 90 was a flare gun of Japanese origin and manufactured by Nambu. It was used by the Imperial Japanese Navy and came with two or three barrels.

The Type 90 designation is from the last two digits of its year of adoption, which was 2590 (or 1930 AD) on the Japanese Kōki calendar. It first came with three barrels with just less than 6,000 were manufactured. The First Model (made in the early 1930s during peacetime) was highly polished and finished, while the Second Model (dating from the mid-1930s to the mid-1940s during wartime) was less polished to speed production. The Third Model (dating from late in World War 2) was simplified and manufactured with two barrels for ease of production.

The barrels were made from blued steel and the body of the weapon was painted with a black lacquer. A two-position safety lever was just above the grip on the left side: up for "fire" and down for "safe". The barrel was selected by a lever above the grip backstrap: left for the left barrel, right for the right barrel and center for the center barrel; on the double-barrel model the center position acted as a second safety.

The barrels had rectangular decals on them indicating which flare was loaded as standard. The three-barreled version's barrels were marked one green decal on the right-hand barrel, one white decal on the top barrel, and one red with a yellow center stripe decal (to indicate red or yellow flares) on the left-hand barrel. White flares were used for illumination at twilight and night, black smoke was used for obscurement, and the colored flares were used for signalling. The shells had cardboard hulls with a brass or steel base.

The Imperial Navy's Type 90 is rarer than the Imperial Army's Type 10 for a few good reasons. First, they were made in lower numbers than the Army type. Second, they were usually issued to ships and naval aircraft and were lost when they were destroyed or sank. Third, US soldiers who found flare guns on the battlefield often threw them away, as they were not seen as collectable as pistols, rifles, or knives.

== Users ==
- Empire of Japan
- People's Republic of China: The Communist Chinese government manufactured a copy of the double-barreled Type 90 from 1949 to 1957. It was replaced by the single-barreled 26.5x80mmR Type 57, a copy of the single-barreled Soviet SPSh-44 flare pistol.
- North Vietnam: The Viet Minh and later People's Army of Vietnam (PAVN) used both the original Japanese versions and Communist Chinese copies. They were replaced in front-line use by the Soviet models in the mid-1960s.

== In film ==
In Hollywood films like Demolition Man (1993) and Waterworld (1995), the Type 90 is used as a stand-in for a futuristic shotgun pistol.
