= Honorary weapons of Russia =

Military awards

Russia has a long history of awarding honorary weapons, which is part of its military traditions and culture. This practice is related to the country's complex system of orders, decorations and medals.

== History ==
=== Tsarist period ===
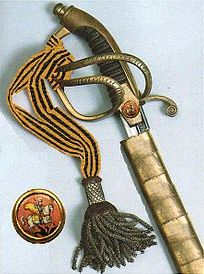
Award St. George's weapon

In the Tsardom of Moscow, the custom of awarding soldiers with weapons was already in place in the mid-17th century. The earliest known award dates back to 1642, when Tsar Mikhail Fyodorovich granted one of his confidants an award sabre with the inscription: "The Sovereign, Tsar and Grand Duke, Mikhail Fyodorovich has granted this sabre to the steward Bogdan Khitrovo." Award weapons, which were state awards, were presented for special military or, in some cases, civil merits. Most awards were made with bladed weapons, but in some cases, with firearms. The first mention of an award with firearms dates back to 1667, when Hetman Frol Minayev received a pishchal with an apple-wood stock decorated with bone and nacre from the Armoury Chamber.

The starting point in the creation of legislation for award weapons should be considered the creation of a regular army and navy under Peter the Great.

In 1797, Paul I introduced the Anninsky weapon into the award system.

Under Alexander I, the status of award weapons in the award system of the Russian Empire was enshrined in law: according to the decree of September 28, 1807, award weapons were equated to orders and divided into four classes:

- Gold weapons without an inscription;
- Gold weapons with the inscription "For Bravery";
- Gold weapons with diamonds;
- Blades decorated with diamonds and laurels.

The beginning of the wars against Napoleon (in which the Russian Empire participated) required an increase in the production of weapons for the army, and in 1808, by order of the Minister of War, the Tula Arms Plant stopped producing award and gift weapons for some time.

In general, before the 1812 French invasion of Russia, cases of awarding personalized weapons were isolated and were made by the tsars personally. During the French invasion, the awarding of weapons became widespread. In subsequent years, awards continued - in the wars with Turkey and the Persian War, 349 people received gold weapons, in the Polish war - 341, for the Hungarian campaign of 1849 - 121. In the Crimean War of 1853–1856, 456 officers received gold weapons, and 1,551 officers received Anninsky weapons.

Later, this tradition, slightly modified, was preserved until the February Revolution of 1917 and after it.

In pre-revolutionary Russia, not only Russian subjects were awarded weapons. For example, on the recommendation of Admiral Fyodor Ushakov, the Turkish captain Zeller was awarded a sabre decorated with diamonds worth 1,803 rubles. Statistics on such awards are not kept, as are the rather numerous awards of gold bladed weapons to Russian subjects on behalf of foreign sovereigns.

In 1913, when the new statute of the Order of St. George appeared, the gold weapons assigned to this order received a new official name - St. George's weapons and St. George's weapons decorated with diamonds. All types of these weapons began to have a small enamel cross of theOrder of St. George; on the general's weapons, the inscription "For Bravery" was replaced by an indication of the feat for which the award was granted. From that time on, the hilt of the St. George's weapons was officially not gold, but only gilded. During the World War I, the St. George's weapons became a mass-produced type of award. In total, 5,700 people were awarded it in 1914–1917 (from January to December 1916 alone, 2,005 people were awarded the St. George weapon, three of whom were awarded weapons decorated with diamonds).

=== Soviet period ===
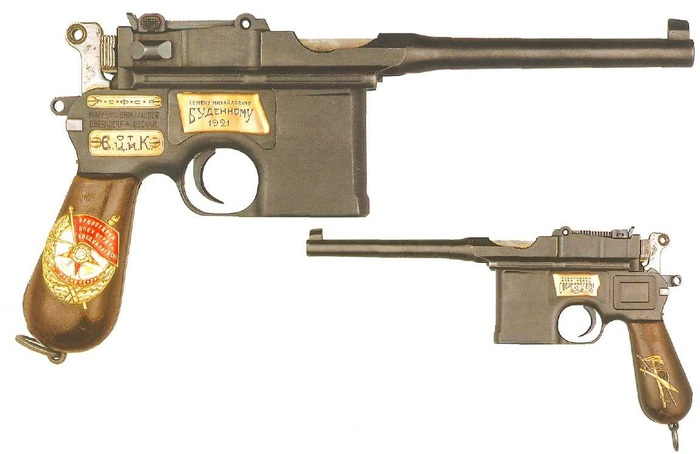
Award Mauser of Semyon Budyonny

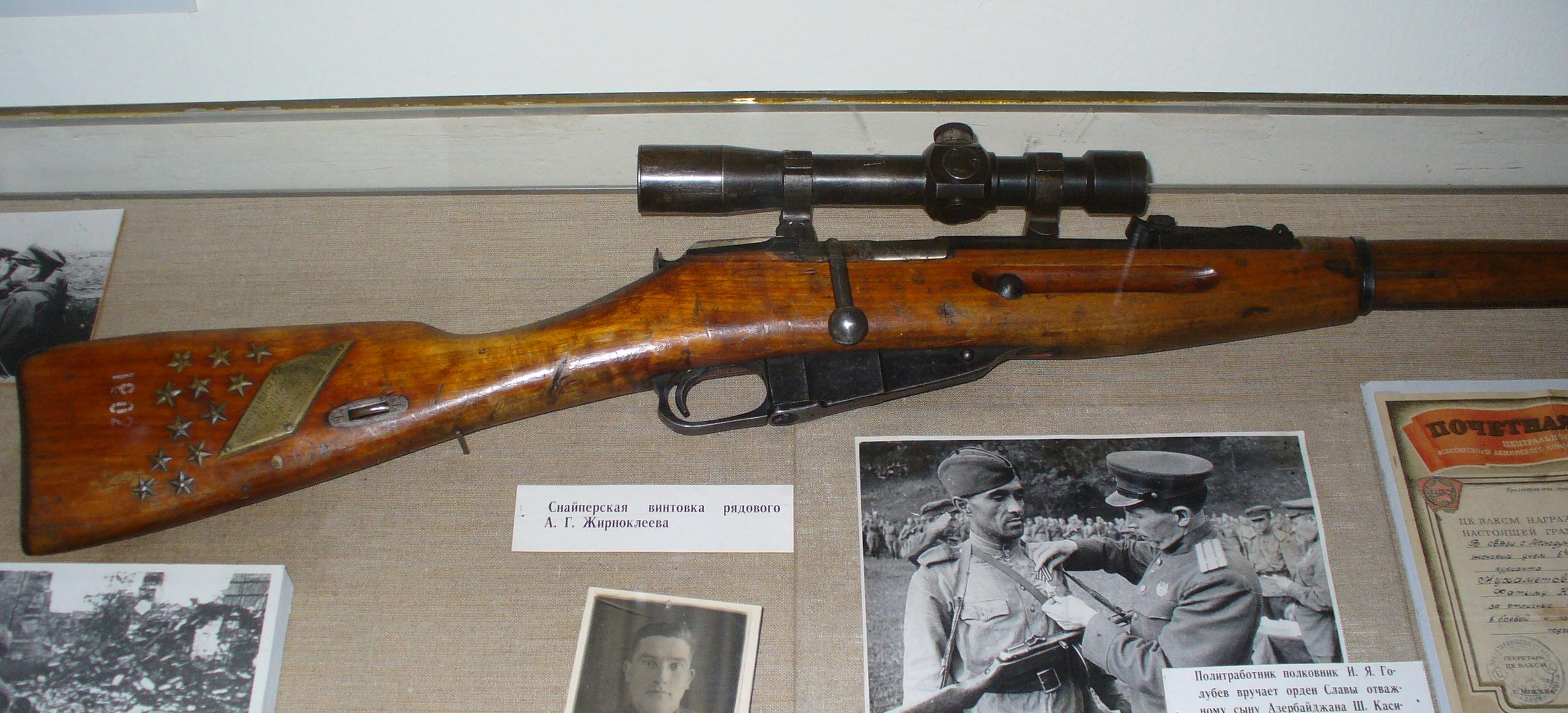
A personal sniper rifle M1891/1931 with a telescopic sight that belonged to a sniper A. G. Zhirnokleyev

The practice of awarding cold and firearms was already established during the Russian Civil War. Later, in 1919–1930, the Honorary Revolutionary Weapon was awarded. In total, from 1919 to the beginning of 1930, 21 people were awarded it (two of them twice).

In addition, in 1927, for military successes in defeating armed gangs operating in the mountainous and forested regions of the North Caucasus, the battalion commander of the Vladikavkaz Infantry School Georgy Rodin was awarded a personalized Browning pistol. In 1928, for saving fishermen in the Sea of Azov, the Italian pilot Primo Gibelli was awarded a personalized weapon and the Honorary Certificate of the All-Russian Central Executive Committee.

In November 1928, for initiative and courage in combat operations, the squadron commander of the 87th Transbaikal Regiment of the 9th Separate Far Eastern Cavalry Brigade of the Red Army Kuzma Sinilov was awarded a personalized Mauser pistol.

In 1930, weapons were awarded to 11 Red Army commanders who distinguished themselves during military operations on the Chinese Eastern Railway: Brigade Commander Stepan Vostretsov was awarded the Honorary Revolutionary Weapon, the commander of the artillery battery of the Primorsky Group of Forces M. A. Taube and nine commanders of the 105th Rifle Regiment of the 35th Rifle Division of the Red Army were awarded personalized weapons. Also in 1930, three operatives of the Moscow Criminal Investigations Department (N. I. Zhivalov, A. Kochkin and P. Kuzin) were awarded personalized Mauser pistols. On December 20, 1930, the TK pistol was awarded to the commandant of the 17th Timkovich border detachment I. I. Apanasevich (who developed the operation that resulted in the arrest of a Polish intelligence agent)).

At the end of 1931, the platoon commander of the combined detachment of cadets of the Lenin United Central Asian School Nikolai Lyashchenko was awarded a personalized weapon (for skillful command of the unit and personal bravery in battles with the Basmachi movement during the detachment's 1,200-km march through the Karakum Desert in September 1931).

In May 1932, a graduate of the Naval Academy, Nikolai Kuznetsov, was awarded a personalized TK pistol.

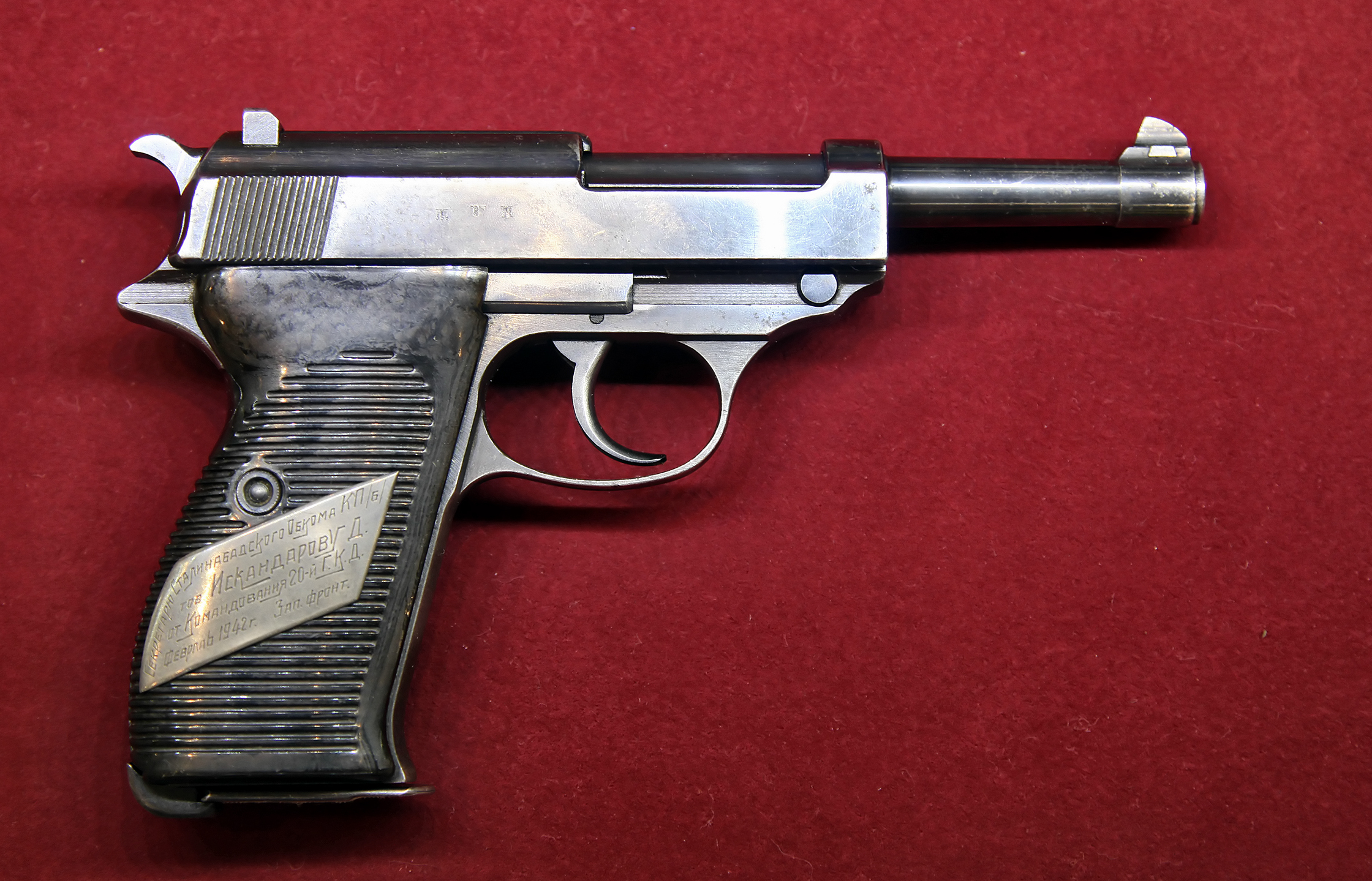
Award Walther P38 of Dzhurabek Iskandarov in the Tula Museum of Weapons

For military distinctions in the fight against the Basmachi movement, by the Decree of the Central Executive Committee of the Soviet Union of October 27, 1932, the commander of the aviation unit of the 95th transport aviation detachment of the Air Force of the Central Asian Military District, Pavel Nedosekin, was awarded a personalized weapon. On June 5, 1934, participants in the operation to search and rescue the crew of the icebreaker "Chelyuskin", Soviet Border Troops pilots V. A. Shurygin and A. A. Shestov, were awarded personalized Mauser pistols.

There were no awarded weapons among the participants in the Battle of Lake Khasan in the summer of 1938. Among the participants in the Battles of Khalkhin Gol in 1939, one person was awarded a weapon by decision of the government of a foreign state: on September 14, 1940, by decision of the Council of Ministers of the Mongolian People's Republic, the divisional commissar of the 17th Army, Mikhail Nikishev was awarded a personalized firearm - a Sauer hunting shotgun - for his military merits in the battles against Japanese troops

The majority of those awarded personalized weapons in the Soviet Union occurred during the Great Patriotic War (at the same time, there were cases of awarding distinguished snipers with personalized sniper rifles, at least several infantrymen were awarded PPSh-41 submachine guns and on May 1, 1944, a personalized machine gun was awarded). There are known cases of awarding captured weapons. There were cases of presenting personalized bladed weapons as a collective award (for example, the Sword of Stalingrad).

At the same time, there were repeated awards of weapons (sniper Vasiliy Komaritsky, who was awarded a sniper rifle after killing 170 enemy soldiers and officers, was awarded a personalized pistol).

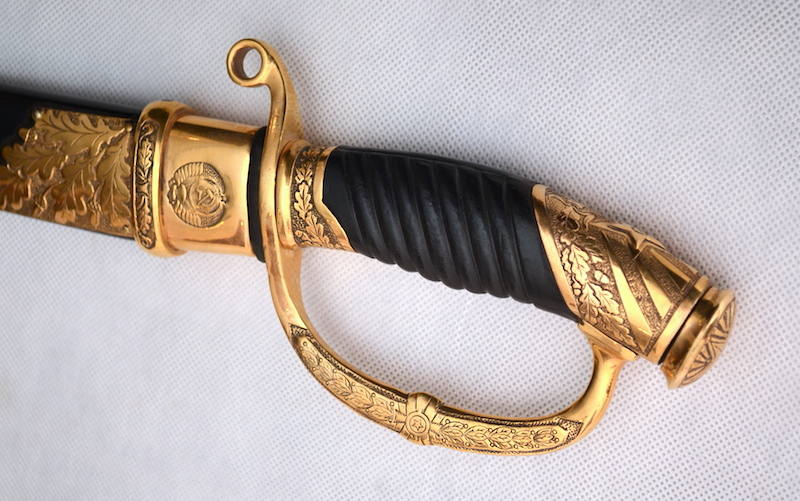
Honorary weapons with a gold image of the State Emblem of the Soviet Union

In the post-war period, the basis and procedure for presenting this award was strictly regulated by the disciplinary regulations of the Soviet Armed Forces.

In 1968, the Presidium of the Supreme Soviet of the Soviet Union established a new category of award weapons for senior officers of the Soviet Armed Forces, honorary weapons with a gold image of the State Emblem of the Soviet Union (in total, 26 senior officers were awarded this weapon).

In 1975, two new categories were introduced: prize weapons for military athletes (for winning competitions in military-applied sports, such as shooting or fencing) and gift weapons – hunting rifles and carbines, which the command of military units could award to civilians. A small batch of custom-made AKM and AK-74 assault rifles (with a butt, fore-end, handguard, pistol grip and magazine made of green plastic) was manufactured to award the best Soviet Border Troops. (the first AKM award assault rifles were presented on January 24, 1973; later awards were made with AK-74 assault rifles.

=== Russian Federation ===
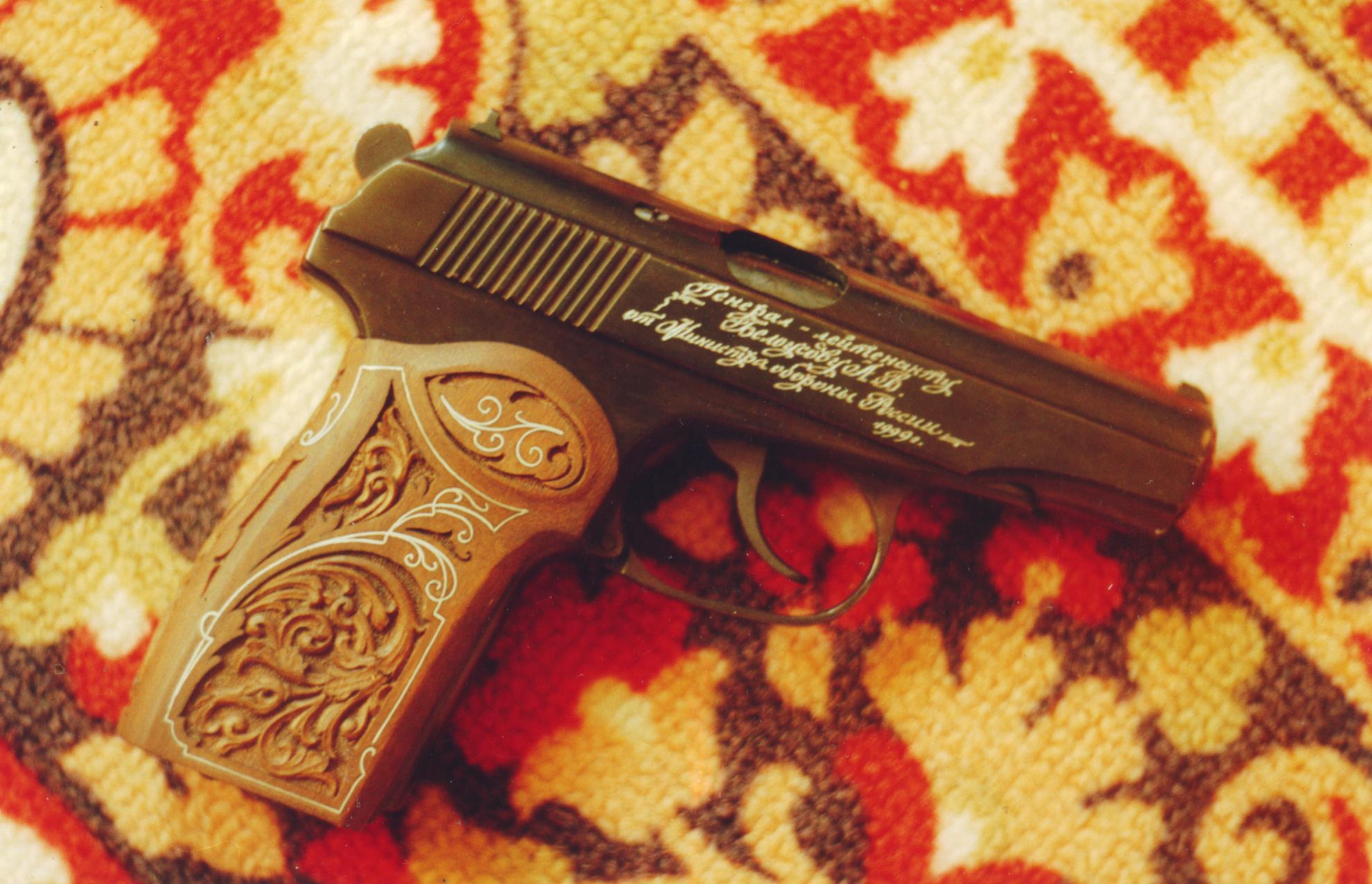
Makarov honorary pistol awarded in 1999 to Aleksandr Belousov by Minister of Defense, Igor Sergeyev.

Since 1993, legal relations arising from the circulation of award weapons in the Russian Federation have been regulated by the Federal Law "On Weapons", according to which award weapons are civilian, combat short-barreled hand-held small arms and bladed weapons received by citizens of the Russian Federation as an award on the basis of a decree of the president of Russia, a resolution of the Government of Russia, award documents of heads of foreign states and heads of government of foreign states, as well as on the basis of orders of the heads of state paramilitary organizations. The types, types, models of combat short-barreled hand-held small arms and bladed weapons that citizens of Russia can be awarded, as well as the procedure for awarding the specified weapons, are established by the Government of Russia. The sale, donation and inheritance of combat short-barreled hand-held small arms award weapons are not permitted.

According to the rules for awarding citizens of the Russian Federation with weapons, the award funds include:

- Civilian weapons that have certificates of conformity; combat and edged weapons included in the list of types, models, and models of combat short-barreled hand-held small arms and edged weapons approved by the Government of Russia, which citizens of the Russian Federation may be awarded;
- Cartridges for award weapons that meet the established requirements.

The rules for applying commemorative inscriptions to award weapons, their decoration and artistic design are established in the regulations on the award funds of state paramilitary organizations.

Until December 2003, there was no list of types and models of award firearms; it was possible to award a pistol or revolver of foreign manufacture, including one equipped with a silencer.

In 2005, a woman was awarded an honorary weapon of the Russian Federation for the first time (T. N. Moskalkova), who was awarded a Makarov pistol.

On December 5, 2005, a list of models of award pistols and revolvers was approved:

- Nagant, RSA "Kobalt", R-92 and OTs-11 "Nickel" revolvers;
- TT, PM, PSM, PMM, P-96M, GSh-18, MP-443 Grach, OTs-21 Malysh, OTs-26 Malysh, OTs-27 Berdysh pistols.

On November 10, 2007, by Decree of the president of Russia No. 1495, a new version of the Disciplinary Regulations of the Armed Forces of the Russian Federation was introduced. Since then, only officers can be awarded award weapons.

In August 2011, the list of award weapons was expanded to include the Glock 17, Parabellum P-08, Beretta 92FS and CZ 75BD pistols.

In May 2012, the Russian Ministry of Internal Affairs approved the administrative regulations, which establish the procedure for registering award weapons and the grounds for their confiscation.

In 2012, the director of the Federal Bailiff Service issued an order introducing an exam for the green beret of the Federal Bailiff Service of the Russian Federation (a distinctive mark for the most professionally trained employees of the bailiff service). The winners who pass the exam are awarded an award bladed weapon - the "Combat" combat knife.

Among the first to receive award weapons from Defense Minister Pavel Grachev were those who participated in the White House shooting in October 1993, and in the period from January 11, 1995, to June 11, 1996, he presented another 640 personalized pistols. Subsequent events give reason to talk about a change in the status of the award - already by the mid-1990s, from a mark of distinction for military qualities, personalized weapons were increasingly transformed into an exclusive gift for officials and the business elite.

The total number of owners of personalized and honorary weapons in post-Soviet Russia has tended to increase: if in 1999 there were 3,142 owners of award weapons in Russia, then in 2000 there were 4,409, in 2005 there were 9,788, at the beginning of 2009 there were 11,401, and by the beginning of October 2012 there were 12,000. The figures given do not fully reflect the growth dynamics of the number of owners of award weapons in Russia, since in the period up to 2013, according to incomplete data, at least 101 handguns were stolen or lost by owners of award weapons, another 12 pistols were confiscated due to suicide and 9 due to the arrest of the owners.

As of the beginning of 2013, according to the Russian Ministry of Internal Affairs, there were 12,527 owners of award weapons in Russia, who had 12,778 award weapons.

In August 2013, a bill was submitted to the Russian parliament for consideration that would expand the list of award melee weapons by including Cossack sabers and kinjals.

On January 20, 2015, the list of award weapons was expanded to include the Glock 26 and Steyr M-A1 pistols.

At the same time, cases of award and gift weapons being presented to citizens of foreign countries became known (in February 2015, Russian president Vladimir Putin presented an AKM assault rifle to Egyptian President, Abdel Fattah el-Sisi; in August 2017, Syrian Army Brigadier General Suhayl al-Hasan received an award sabre from the Russian Ministry of Defense).

In January 2018, the Governor of Khabarovsk Krai V. I. Shport received a dagger as a personal honorary weapon. By the beginning of 2019, there were over 19,500 honorary weapons in Russia (16,700 honorary firearms with rifled barrel, 342 honorary smoothbore firearms and 2,500 honorary bladed cold arms).

On August 5, 2023, Defense Minister Sergei Shoigu gave six Yarygin pistols as honorary firearms to six military officers of the Center group of forces. On August 24, 2023, the Yarygin award pistol was awarded to the gunner-operator of the Alyosha tank, yefreytor A. M. Neustroyev.

On October 25, 2023, the commander of the 155th Guards Naval Infantry Brigade, Colonel M. Gudkov, and the commander of the 810th Guards Naval Infantry Brigade, Colonel O. A. Vlasov, were awarded two Lebedev pistols (this is the first known case of awarding this weapon).

== See also ==
- Weapons of honour
