= IZh-94 =

Russian double-barreled shotgun

- Type: Double barreled shotgun
- Place of origin: Russia

Production history
- Designer: A. I. Matveyev
- Manufacturer: Izhevsk Mechanical Plant
- Produced: Since 1993

Specifications
- Mass: 3.0 - 3.4 kg
- Length: 1050mm
- Barrel length: 600mm
- Width: 55mm
- Height: 200mm (without optical sight)
- Caliber: 12, 20 gauge or .410 bore.22 LR, 5.6×39mm, 7.62×39mm, .308 Winchester, 7.62×54mmR
- Action: Break-action

The IZh-94 (also known as MP-94) is a Russian double-barreled shotgun.

== History ==
The IZh-94 was designed in 1992 as a successor to the IZh-27.

In September 2008, all Izhevsk Mechanical Plant firearms were renamed and the IZh-94 became known as the MP-94 (Mechanical Plant-94).

== Design ==
The IZh-94 is an over-and-under hammerless shotgun, with one barrel above the other. The barrels are detachable. The weapon is based on the design of the IZh-27M shotgun

It has a walnut or beech stock and fore-end.

All IZh-94 variants have iron sights and a scope base for optical sights are available.

== Variants ==
- IZh-94 (ИЖ-94) - Smoothbore shotgun.
- IZh-94 "Sever" (ИЖ-94 "Север") - Combination gun, .20 gauge barrel over 5.6 mm rifled barrel (.22 LR, .22 WMR or 5.6×39mm)
- IZh-94 "Taiga" (ИЖ-94 "Тайга") - Combination gun, .12 gauge barrel (.12/70mm or .12/76 mm Magnum) over 7.62 mm caliber rifled barrel (7.62×39mm, .308 Winchester or 7.62×54mmR)
- IZh-94 "Express" (ИЖ-94 "Экспресс") - Double-barreled rifle.
- IZh-94 "Scout" (ИЖ-94 "Скаут") - Lightweight combination gun (2.76 kg), .410 bore and .22 LR. The first rifle was introduced in January 2002.

== Users ==
- Belarus - is allowed as civilian hunting weapon
- Kazakhstan - is allowed as civilian hunting weapon
- Russian Federation - is allowed as civilian hunting weapon
- Ukraine - is allowed as civilian hunting weapon
- USA - the import was allowed and IZh-94 were sold as the Remington SPR94

== Museum exhibits ==
- One IZh-94 shotgun is in the collection of Tula State Arms Museum in Tula Kremlin.

== Sources ==
- Ружьё охотничье комбинированное ИЖ-94. Паспорт ЕИФЮ.776313.002 ПС
- ИЖ-94 // журнал "Мастер ружьё", № 9 (78), 2003.
- Двуствольное комбинированное ружьё MP-94 Север / Izhevsk Mechanical Plant official website
