= IZh-59 =

Soviet double-barreled shotgun

IZh-59 «Sputnik»
- Type: double barreled shotgun
- Place of origin: USSR

Production history
- Designer: A. A. Klimov
- Manufacturer: Izhevsk Mechanical Plant
- Produced: 1960 - 1964
- No. built: 21 218

Specifications
- Mass: 3.3 - 3.5 kg
- Barrel length: 750mm
- Caliber: 12 gauge
- Action: Break-action
- Rate of fire: variable
- Sights: iron sights

The IZh-59 «Sputnik» (ИЖ-59 «Спутник») is a Soviet double-barreled shotgun.

== History ==
In the mid-1950s in Soviet Union began work on design the first model of double-barreled shotgun in the over and under configuration. In 1959, the development of the model was completed and since 1960 Izhevsk Mechanical Plant began its serial production.

Since January 1961, the price of one standard IZh-59 was 120 rubles.

In early 1960s, work began on creating a new model based on the IZh-59 design. In 1962, the first IZh-12 shotguns were made, and its serial production began in 1963. In 1964, production of the IZh-59 was discontinued.

In total, 21,218 shotguns have been made.

== Design ==
IZh-59 «Sputnik» was the first model of Soviet over and under shotguns.

It is a hammerless shotgun, with chokes at the muzzle end.

It has a walnut or beech stock and fore-end. Some shotguns were equipped with a rubber recoil pad on its shoulder stock.

== Variants ==
The shotguns were produced in eight versions, which had minor differences between them.

- IZh-59-2 «Sputnik-2» (ИЖ-59-2 «Спутник-2») – was equipped with a second pair of 650mm detachable barrels
- IZh-59-3 «Sputnik-3» (ИЖ-59-3 «Спутник-3») – was the version of standard IZh-59 hunting shotgun with minor differences in trigger mechanism
- IZh-59-4 «Sputnik-4» (ИЖ-59-4 «Спутник-4») – was the sporting version for skeet shooting, also equipped with a second pair of barrels
- IZh-59-5 «Sputnik-5» (ИЖ-59-5 «Спутник-5») – was the version of standard IZh-59 hunting shotgun with ejector

== Users ==
- Soviet Union
- USA – the import was allowed

== Sources ==
- В. Лобас. Универсальный спусковой механизм к ружью ИЖ-59 // журнал «Охота и охотничье хозяйство», № 12, декабрь 1963. стр.38-40
- Л. Е. Михайлов, Н. Л. Изметинский. Ижевские охотничьи ружья. 2-е изд., испр. и доп. Ижевск, изд-во «Удмуртия», 1982.
- Ижевское оружие. Том 1. Ижевские ружья / Н. Л. Изметинский, Л. Е. Михайлов. - Ижевск, издательство Удмуртского университета, 1995. - 247 стр. : ил.
- ИЖ-59 "Спутник" // В. Н. Трофимов. Отечественные охотничьи ружья гладкоствольные. М., ДАИРС, 2000. стр.261-263
