= 2013 Belgorod shooting =

Mass shooting in Belgorod, Russia

Coordinates: 50.6006°N 36.5911°E

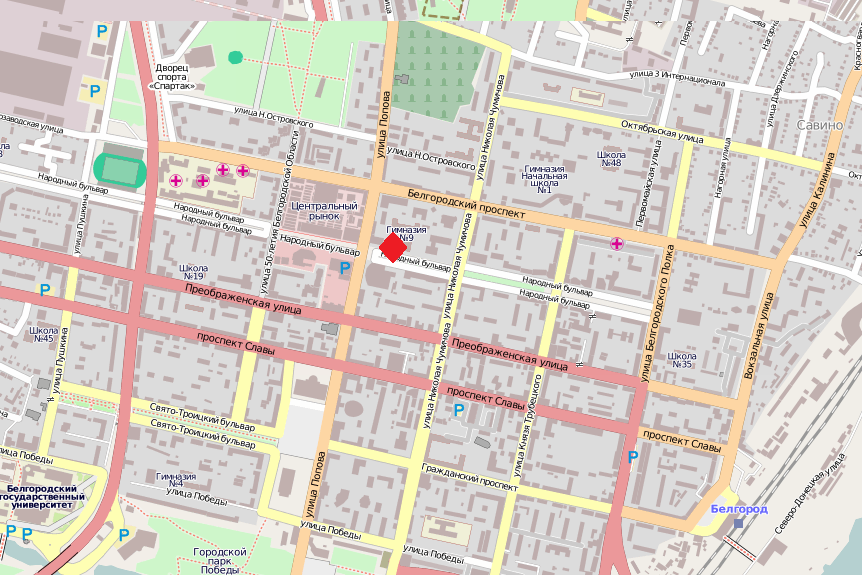
- Location of the shooting in Belgorod
- Location: Belgorod, Russia
- Date: 22 April 2013; 13 years ago c. 14:20 (UTC+3)
- Attack type: Mass shooting, mass murder
- Weapons: Vepr-308; IZh-58; IZh-27E; 2 Tiger Semi-Automatic Rifles
- Deaths: 6
- Injuries: 1
- Perpetrator: Sergey Pomazun

The 2013 Belgorod shooting was a mass murder that occurred on April 22, 2013, in Belgorod, Russia, where six people were killed. 31-year-old Sergey Pomazun shot three people at a gun store and three people on the street outside with a semi-automatic rifle in downtown Belgorod before fleeing to Kursk Oblast, where he was apprehended the next day after an extensive manhunt. Pomazun, an army veteran with a history of petty crime and unstable behavior, confessed to the killings, and in his widely covered trial claimed to have murdered many more innocent people during the Second Chechen War in classified missions as an agent of the GRU.

On August 23, 2013, Pomazun was convicted and sentenced to life in prison.

== Perpetrator ==
Sergey Aleksandrovich Pomazun (Серге́й Алекса́ндрович Помазу́н) was born on June 3, 1981, in Kupino, a village in Shebekinsky District, Belgorod Oblast, Soviet Union. His father, Alexander Pomazun, was a long-time employee at a fertilizer factory until leaving in the 1990s due to a serious salary delay, and ran a private hunting farm in the Shebekinsky district. His mother, Lyudmila Pomazuna, worked as an accountant in the local department of education. Pomazun attended Belgorod secondary school No. 42, where he was recorded as having poor grades at academic subjects but strong grades at practical subjects. In 1996, he entered the vocational school No. 33 training to be an auto mechanic. In 1999, Pomazun was conscripted into the Armed Forces of the Russian Federation and approved for service by the military medical board, who placed him into Category "A" – those deemed fully mentally and physically fit without restrictions to their service. Pomazun was designated to an electronic warfare battalion in Belgorod Oblast, where he was appointed an electrician at the battalion's headquarters. According to colleagues, Pomazun was considered strange and people rarely noticed him.

In 2002, Pomazun and an accomplice were found guilty of stealing two VAZ-2107 cars from private garages and scrapping them for private gain. He was sentenced to two years probation and ordered to pay 2000 rubles in compensation. In 2003, Pomazun was found guilty of stealing a VAZ-21213 car from a Belgorod hospital parking lot and a VAZ-2106 car from a private garage, scrapping them for profit, and during his arrest striking the arresting police officer in the ear. Pomazun received a 5-year and 1-month sentence at a low-security penal colony, but required only serving during weekdays and was allowed weekend furloughs at home. In September 2007, he was denied parole. In 2008, Pomazun was found guilty of stealing two cars, a Mazda 6 and a Lada 111, during his weekend breaks. On June 17, 2008, a court sentenced him to an additional 5-years and 4-months in a high-security penal colony, but an appeal on July 23, 2008, led to the sentence reduced to 4-years 10-months. Pomazun was sent to a penal colony in Belgorod before being transferred to one in Valuyki, where he had a record of bad behavior and received 29 individual penalties. According to his father, Pomazun had intentionally violated prison rules to be placed into the isolation ward to get away from the other inmates.

On December 20, 2012, Pomazun was released from prison, moving in with his parents and living in a largely asocial life playing video games. Alexander Pomazun stated: "He began to notice that when deciding tickets, he began to talk. He repeated the same word five or six times. On many occasions he read aloud the same ticket, and then he was psychologically and swore with obscene language. He switched on and off the switch in the kitchen about 40 times in a row, talked to himself with a whisper, began to wander aimlessly around the room. He took out all our family photo albums, as well as his army photos, and burned them. When asked why he did this, he replied that they interfere, they are from a past life." Eventually, Pomazun decided to upgrade the vehicle category of his drivers license with the intention of becoming a taxicab driver and passed the theory test, but in April 2013 he failed the practical test. According to Alexander Pomazun, he had begun to behave aggressively returning from the test, and upon arriving home shouted about Chechnya and the GRU then attacked his father with a knife which he had previously purchased. Alexander fended off Pomazun, receiving only minor wounds and the next day handed him in to the local police station. Pomazun was not charged and was given advice by a police officer before being released, after which he failed the taxi practical test two more times. Upon failing his third test, Pomazun threatened to kill the instructor and their children, and began shouting about Chechnya and the GRU. Lyudmila Pomazuna appealed to the Belgorod Oblast branch of the Ministry of Internal Affairs about her son's behavior, but her application was rejected. She instead contacted a psychological clinic, but was told they had no right to compulsory treatment of patients (Pomazun rejected treatment) and advised her to contact the police again. On April 19, 2013, Lyudmila Pomazuna appealed to the Belgorod Oblast state police but received no response.

Around this time, Pomazun had conflict with a security guard that had insulted him and thrown him out of a department store in Belgorod. Pomazun decided to take revenge by planning to kill the guard, and even prepared for a possible shootout with guards of the store's private security.

== Shooting ==
On the morning of April 22, 2013, after Pomazun's parents had left for work, he broke into his father's safe which contained numerous guns, including a Vepr-308 semi-automatic rifle, IZh-27E,IZh-58 hunting rifles,Tiger Semi-Automatic Rifle and 144 rounds. Pomazun stole the Saiga and his father's BMW X5, recently bought earlier by the family on credit. He drove to Belgorod city center, parked the car and wrapping the gun in a cloth. At about 14:16 (UTC+3) Pomazun went to the Okhota hunting store located near the intersection of Popova Street and Narodny Boulevard, where he demanded they sell him ammunition. After receiving a refusal, he shot two sales assistants and a customer, then broke into a display cabinet and stole two carbines, as well as more than 250 rounds of different calibers. Pomazun then exited the store and in broad daylight shot three random people that were walking by, with two of them, a man and a 14-year-old schoolgirl, dying at the scene. The third, a 16-year-old schoolgirl, was wounded and died in a hospital an hour later. The four other victims were all males aged between 28 and 49.

Pomazun escaped from the scene in the BMW X5, which was later abandoned, and quickly was identified along with his three previous convictions. He drove to the edge of forest on the outskirts of Belgorod and abandoned the car, then walked several kilometers into the woods where he changed his clothes and buried the gun he had used in the shooting. A combined force of around 2,000 policemen started an extensive manhunt searching for Pomazun, with Belgorod authorities offering a reward of 3 million rubles for his capture. All available policemen from Belgorod Oblast, the neighboring regions of Kursk Oblast and Voronezh Oblast, as well as an OMON detachment from Moscow, joined the search.

On April 23, the night after the shooting, Pomazun was arrested near a railway station in Kursk Oblast where he was attempting to flee on a freight train. Four Kursk Oblast police officers were wounded when Pomazun attacked them with a knife, and claimed he had been shooting "into hell".

=== Victims ===
- Alexander Ivaskov (Александр Иваськов), 42–43
- Igor Malykhin (Игорь Малыхин), 39–40
- Mikhail Shamshurin (Михаил Шамшурин), 28–29
- Alina Chizhikova (Алина Чижикова), 13–14
- Sofia Gutsulyak (София Гуцуляк), 16–17
- Igor Boldyrev (Игорь Болдырев), 48–49

== Aftermath ==
In response to the shooting, April 23 and 24 were declared days of mourning in Belgorod Oblast, and the authorities promised to give out a million rubles to each of the victims' families.

=== Trial ===
Pomazun underwent extensive psychiatric analysis, where he was found fit to stand trial. His trial began with preliminary hearings on June 22, 2013, with the prosecutor demanding life in prison. Pomazun confessed to the shooting, but had no regrets, as he said it was an accidental occurrence in the course of "a special operation" that went wrong. Pomazun testified that he plotted to kill the security guard who had insulted him, and that he only intended to steal more weapons and ammunition from the gun store to be better prepared for a possible firefight with the intervening police following the planned murder. He claimed that the initial shooting was sparked by his spotting what he thought was a plain-clothed policeman reaching for a concealed weapon, and reacted by shooting people to clear a path to his car.

Pomazun claimed to the court that, during his service in the Russian armed forces, he had developed a tolerance to killing civilians after being involved in war crimes while fighting in the Second Chechen War between 1999 and 2001, first as a conscript with the regular Russian Army and then as a sharpshooter in a unit of the secretive Spetsnaz GRU. Pomazun claimed that his battalion participated in a series of special operations in Chechnya in order to intimidate the population, where they killed nearly a thousand innocent people "all the way from Mozdok to Khasavyurt". He claimed Chechen civilians were crushed under tanks and that women and children were being beheaded, something that he says has since plagued him in his nightmares. But according to court documents, Pomazun never saw combat in the military and has never been to the North Caucasus, to which Pomazun replied that his service and missions were classified and refused to provide any more details.

Pomazun's lawyer, Viktor Yeremeyev, asked the court for only a 25-year prison sentence due to his poor mental state, and for him to be incarcerated in the Black Dolphin Prison. On August 23, the court under judge Nikolai Kudinov found Pomazun guilty of murdering six people, illegal weapons possession, taking weapons by force and assaulting a police officer. Pomazun was sentenced to life imprisonment in a high-security penal colony, and was ordered to pay 3 million rubles in compensation. When the verdict was read out Pomazun reacted aggressively: he started swearing and threatened to kill those present in court, and promised to squeeze out the eyes of the court photographer. Viktor Yeremeyev attempted to appeal the verdict, stating that Pomazun required further psychological testing before being convicted and that the first investigation was superficial with little regard for his poor mental state, but this was declined.

Since January 28, 2014, Pomazun has been held at the penal colony No. 18 in Kharp, Yamalo-Nenets Autonomous Okrug, more informally known as "Polar Owl".

== See also ==
- 2007 Balashikha shooting
