= Yarygin =

Yarygin may refer to:

- Vladimir Yarygin, Russian designer of sport pistols and of the MP-443 Grach
- Ivan Yarygin, Soviet wrestler and Olympic champion
- Ivan Yarygin Sports Palace
