= IZh-43 =

1986 Soviet double-barreled shotgun

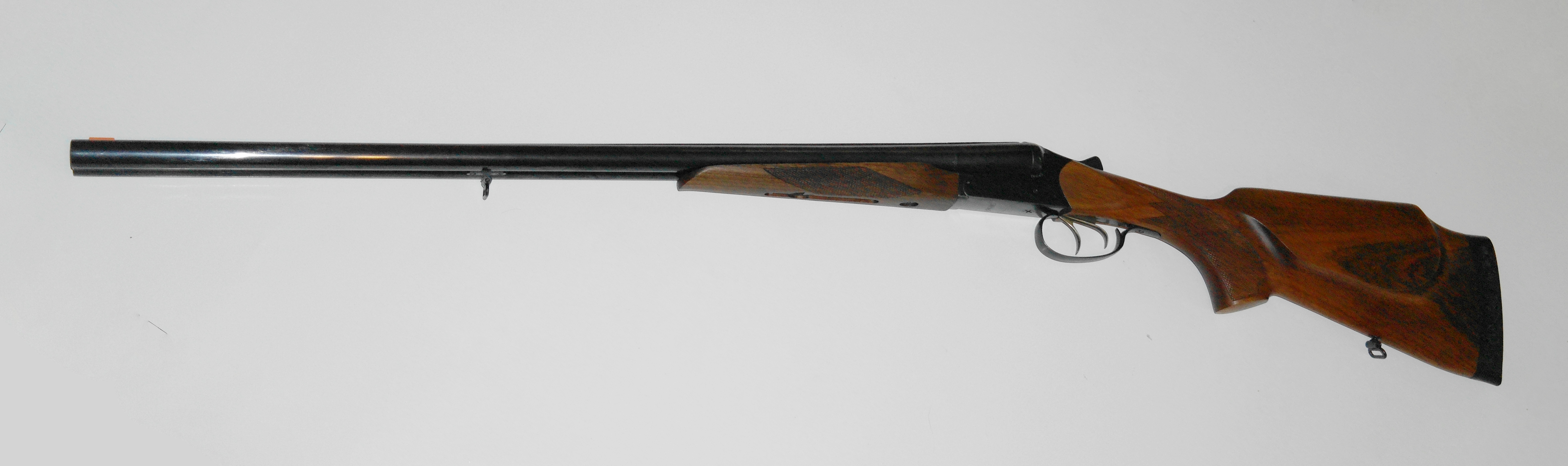
- IZh-43E 12/70
- Type: Double barreled shotgun
- Place of origin: USSR

Production history
- Designer: A. N. Kalinin.
- Manufacturer: Izhevsk Mechanical Plant
- Produced: since 1986

Specifications
- Mass: 3.2 - 3.3 kg
- Barrel length: 720-725mm
- Caliber: 12, 16 gauge, .410 bore
- Action: Break-action
- Rate of fire: Variable
- Sights: Iron sights

The IZh-43 (ИЖ-43) is a Soviet and Russian double-barreled shotgun.

== History ==
The IZh-43 was designed in the early 1980s, and in October 1985, the first prototypes were presented at the hunting weapons exhibition in Irkutsk. Production of the IZh-43 began in 1986.

In 1986, the IZh-43M shotgun was awarded the gold medal at the Leipzig Trade Fair.

From July 1987 until February 1990, the price of a standard IZh-43 was 175 rubles. A custom IZh-43 shotgun, featuring engravings, a walnut stock, and a walnut fore-end, was priced at up to 385 rubles.

In 1988, the Izhevsk Mechanical Plant began mass production of both the IZh-43 and IZh-43E.

In January 2004, a contract was signed between Remington Arms and the Izhevsk Mechanical Plant. Russian firearms were bought by Remington and sold in the USA, with the IZh-43 being marketed as the Remington Spartan 220 and the IZh-43-1S as the Remington Spartan 210.

In September 2008, all firearms produced by the Izhevsk Mechanical Plant were rebranded, and the IZh-43 was renamed the MP-43 (Mechanical Plant-43).

== Design ==
The IZh-43 is a side-by-side smoothbore shotgun, with barrels that feature chokes at the muzzle end.

It has a stock and fore-end made of walnut, birch, or beech wood. Although custom aftermarket variants are known, it features chrome-plated bores made of AR50 steel.

== Variants ==
- IZh-43 (ИЖ-43) - The first model is a hammerless shotgun, with a design based on the IZh-58MA model. [3]
- IZh-43E (ИЖ-43Е) - The second model is a version of the standard IZh-43 with an ejector.
- IZh-43M (ИЖ-43М) - The third model with a two-trigger layout.
- IZh-43EM (ИЖ-43ЕМ) The fourth model, equipped with selective automatic ejectors for spent shells. It has hammer-forged barrels.
- IZh-43-1S (ИЖ-43-1С) The fifth model, equipped with a single selective trigger.
- IZh-43E1SM (ИЖ-43Е1СМ) The sixth model, featuring automatic ejectors, a single selective trigger, and a universal trigger mechanism.
- IZh-43KN (ИЖ-43КН) The seventh model, featuring external operational hammers that must be manually cocked before firing.

== Users ==
- Soviet Union
- Belarus - It is allowed as a civilian hunting weapon.
- Kazakhstan - It is allowed as a civilian hunting weapon.
- Moldova -It is allowed as a civilian hunting weapon.
- Russian Federation - It is allowed as a civilian hunting weapon.

== Sources ==
- Ижевское оружие. Том 1. Ижевские ружья / Н. Л. Изметинский, Л. Е. Михайлов. - Ижевск, издательство Удмуртского университета, 1995. - 247 стр. : ил.
- Assembly and disassembly of the Baikal Bounty Hunter // "American GunSmith" volume XIV Number 8, August 1999 page 3 [IZh-43]
