= IZh-54 =

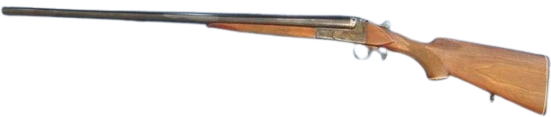
- Type: Double-barreled shotgun
- Place of origin: USSR

Production history
- Designer: A. A. Klimov
- Manufacturer: Izhevsk Mechanical Plant
- Produced: 1954 - 1969
- No. built: 477 695

Specifications
- Mass: 3.2 - 3.6 kg
- Length: 1150 or 1170mm
- Barrel length: 730 or 750mm
- Caliber: 12 gauge
- Action: Break-action
- Rate of fire: variable
- Sights: iron sights

The IZh-54 (ИЖ-54) is a Soviet double-barreled shotgun.

== History ==
IZh-54 was designed in 1951-1954, since 1954 began its serial production.

Since 1961, a new varnish with improved characteristics has been used to protect the wooden parts of the gun.

In December 1964, the price of one standard IZh-54 was 90 roubles. The price of one custom IZh-54 shotgun (with engravings, walnut stock and walnut fore-end) was between 170 and 250 roubles.

In total, 477 695 IZh-54 shotguns were made from 1954 to 1969 and more than seventy thousands of them were sold to foreign countries.

It was the first shotgun of the Izhevsk Mechanical Plant that was sold abroad in large quantities.

In January 1980, a detachable diopter sight was proposed for IZh-54 shotguns.

== Design ==
IZh-54 is a side by side hammerless smoothbore shotgun.

It has a walnut or beech stock and fore-end. It has a chrome-plated bores made from 50А steel (GOST 5160-49). Mainsprings were made from chromium-vanadium steel 50ХФА (GOST 4543-48).

== Variants ==
- IZh-54 (ИЖ-54) - it was produced in three slightly different versions.
- IZh-57 (ИЖ-57) - 16 gauge variant, since 1957

== Users ==
- Soviet Union
- Ukraine - they were on the territory of Ukrainian SSR in Soviet times, now they are allowed as civilian hunting weapon
- United Kingdom - unknown number of shotguns were sold as civilian hunting weapon
- USA - the import was allowed

== Sources ==
- Основы спортивной охоты (охотминимум) / колл. авт., ред. И. Д. Гулевич. М., Воениздат, 1957. стр.120-122
- Охотничье двуствольное ружьё ИЖ-54 // Охотничье, спортивное огнестрельное оружие. Каталог. М., 1958. стр.32-33
- Двуствольное охотничье ружьё ИЖ-54 // Спортивно-охотничье оружие и патроны. Бухарест, "Внешторгиздат", 1965. стр.28-29
- Ю. Константинов. ИЖ-54 глазами владельца // журнал "Мастер-ружьё", № 12, 2013. стр.42-44
- Ю. Максимов. "Модель ИЖ-54". Причины популярности 60 лет спустя // журнал "Мастер-ружьё", № 5, 2018. стр.48-55
