= Remington Spartan 310 =

- Type: Double barreled shotgun
- Place of origin: Soviet Union

Production history
- Designed: 1972
- Manufacturer: Izhevsk Mechanical Plant
- Produced: 2005–2009
- Variants: SPR310; SPR310S

Specifications
- Barrel length: 26, 28, or 29½ inches
- Caliber: 12, 20, or 28 gauge or .410 bore
- Action: Break-action

The Remington Spartan 310 is a double-barreled shotgun. It is an "over and under" gun, with one barrel above the other. There are several different models, each of them chambered in various gauges.

The Spartan 310 is marketed and distributed by Remington Arms, in Madison, North Carolina. It is a variant of the Soviet shotgun IZh-27 manufactured by Izhevsk Mechanical Plant for export under trademark "Baikal", in Izhevsk, Russia. The Spartan 310 is inexpensive compared to other double barreled shotguns. It is most often used for hunting birds, and for clay target games such as trap and skeet. Remington ceased importing the shotgun in 2009.

== Features ==
The Spartan 310 has a walnut stock and fore-end, the shooter can select automatic ejectors or extractors, and a ventilated barrel rib. It uses screw-in SPR choke tubes. By default, the bottom barrel fires first, but the shooter can select the top barrel to fire first by pushing the trigger blade forward when the gun is loaded and closed. Opening the action automatically engages the manual safety, which is located on the tang behind the top lever.

The SPR310 is the standard model. It has either a nickel-plated or blued receiver. The barrels are 26 or 28 inches long.

The SPR310S is the sporting model. It has ported barrels that are 29½ inches in length.
