= IZh-12 =

Soviet double-barreled shotgun

- Type: double barreled shotgun
- Place of origin: USSR

Production history
- Designer: A. A. Klimov
- Manufacturer: Izhevsk Mechanical Plant
- Produced: 1962 - 1974
- No. built: 311 633

Specifications
- Mass: 3.1 - 3.5 kg
- Barrel length: 720 or 730mm
- Caliber: 12, 16 gauge
- Action: Break-action
- Sights: iron sights

The IZh-12 (ИЖ-12) is a Soviet double-barreled shotgun.

== History ==
IZh-12 was designed in early 1960s as a successor to the IZh-59 "Sputnik", in 1962 first shotguns were made. Since 1963 began its serial production.

In January 1965, the price of one standard IZh-12 was 158 rubles. The price of one custom IZh-12 shotgun (with engravings, walnut stock and walnut fore-end) was between 250 and 270 rubles.

In 1967, a detachable diopter sight was proposed for IZh-12 shotguns.

In 1974, production was discontinued. In total, 311,633 shotguns have been made and 129,000 of them were sold to foreign countries.

In 1976, a new detachable diopter sight was proposed for IZh-12 shotguns.

== Design ==
IZh-12 is an over and under hammerless shotgun, with one barrel above the other.

Both barrels are chromed and have chokes at the muzzle end.

It has a walnut or beech stock and fore-end.

== Variants ==
- IZh-15 (ИЖ-15) - over/under combination gun with a rifled 5.6×39mm barrel over a 16 gauge smoothbore barrel. It has a plastic or rubber recoil pad on its shoulder stock and can be equipped with an optical sight.

== Users ==
- Czechoslovakia
- Soviet Union
- United Kingdom - unknown number of shotguns were sold as civilian hunting weapon

== Sources ==
- Спортивно-охотничье ружьё ИЖ-12. 1964. - 24 стр. (заказ No. 2525-64)
- Двуствольное охотничье ружьё ИЖ-12 // Спортивно-охотничье оружие и патроны. Бухарест, "Внешторгиздат", 1965. стр.32-33
- Е. Стайченко. Опыт подгонки ружья // журнал «Охота и охотничье хозяйство», No. 7, 1972. стр.24
- Л. Е. Михайлов, Н. Л. Изметинский. Ижевские охотничьи ружья. Ижевск, изд-во «Удмуртия», 1976. - 175 стр. : ил.
- Л. Е. Михайлов, Н. Л. Изметинский. Ижевские охотничьи ружья. 2-е изд., испр. и доп. Ижевск, изд-во «Удмуртия», 1982.
- Ижевское оружие. Том 1. Ижевские ружья / Н. Л. Изметинский, Л. Е. Михайлов. - Ижевск, издательство Удмуртского университета, 1995. - 247 стр. : ил.
- ИЖ-12 // В. Н. Трофимов. Отечественные охотничьи ружья гладкоствольные. М., ДАИРС, 2000. стр.263-265
