= IZh-58 =

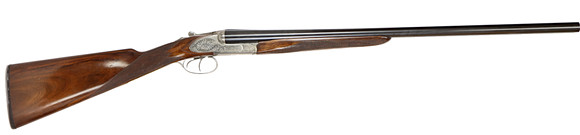
- Type: Double-barreled shotgun
- Place of origin: USSR

Production history
- Designer: L. I. Pugachev
- Manufacturer: Izhevsk Mechanical Plant
- Produced: 1958 - 1987

Specifications
- Mass: 2.7 - 3.2 kg
- Barrel length: 675, 720, 730 mm
- Caliber: 12, 16, 20, 28 gauge
- Action: Break-action
- Rate of fire: Variable
- Sights: Iron sights

The IZh-58 (ИЖ-58) is a Soviet double-barreled shotgun.

== History ==
The IZh-58 was designed by L. I. Pugachev (Л. И. Пугачев) in 1958 and, in the last months of 1958, the first models were produced.

Since 1961, a new varnish with improved characteristics has been used to protect the wooden parts of the gun. As a result, since January 1961, the price of one standard IZh-58 was 60 roubles.

More than 1.36 million IZh-58 hunting shotguns were produced in all four standard variants. In addition, one experimental sample of a lightweight IZh-58 was made with aluminium alloy details.

It was replaced by the IZh-43 model in the late 1980s. The last IZh-58MAE shotgun was made in 1987.

== Design ==
The IZh-58 is a side-by-side smoothbore shotgun. The detachable barrels are made from heat-treated 50RA steel (сталь 50PA).

The barrels have chokes at the muzzle end.

It has a walnut, birch or beech shoulder stock and fore-end.

== Variants ==
- IZh-58 (ИЖ-58) - First model. In total, 642,000 IZh-58 shotguns were made between 1958-1971 and 73,000 of them were sold to other countries.
- IZh-58M (ИЖ-58М) - Second model, since 1970. In total, 235,000 IZh-58M shotguns were made between 1970-1976 and 115,000 of them were sold to other countries.
- IZh-58MA (ИЖ-58МА) - Third model, since 1975. It is equipped with a different safety mechanism.
- IZh-58MAE (ИЖ-58МАЕ) - Last model, since 1977. It is equipped with another different safety mechanism and ejector.
- IZh-58MA-20M (ИЖ-58MA-20М) - Export variant. (IZh-58MA with 670-680mm barrels, chambered in 20/76 mm Magnum shotgun shells).

== Users ==
- Soviet Union
- Belarus - is allowed as civilian hunting weapon
- Bulgaria
- Russian Federation - is allowed as civilian hunting weapon
- USA - the import was allowed

== Sources ==
- Охотничье двуствольное ружьё ИЖ-58 // Охотничье, спортивное огнестрельное оружие. Каталог. М., 1958. стр.36-37
- Двуствольное охотничье ружьё ИЖ-58 // Спортивно-охотничье оружие и патроны. Бухарест, "Внешторгиздат", 1965. стр.26-27
- Отечественные ружья // журнал «Охота и охотничье хозяйство», № 1, 1965. стр.36-37
- Э. Штейнгольд. Ружьё ИЖ-58М // журнал «Охота и охотничье хозяйство», № 7, 1973. стр.28
- Universal/Baikal Model IJ-58M double-barrel shotgun // "American Rifleman", January 1977
- Отечественное охотничье оружие. ИЖ-58 // журнал «Охота и охотничье хозяйство», № 3, 1981. стр.33
- М. М. Блюм, И. Б. Шишкин. Охотничье ружьё. М., «Лесная промышленность», 1983. стр.85
- Ижевское оружие. Том 1. Ижевские ружья / Н. Л. Изметинский, Л. Е. Михайлов. - Ижевск, издательство Удмуртского университета, 1995. - 247 стр. : ил.
