= IZh-56 =

- Type: double barreled shotgun
- Place of origin: USSR

Production history
- Designer: A. A. Klimov
- Manufacturer: Izhevsk Mechanical Plant
- Produced: 1956 - 1964

Specifications
- Mass: 3.0 - 3.15 kg
- Barrel length: 650 or 720mm
- Caliber: 28, 32 gauge.22 LR
- Action: Break-action
- Rate of fire: variable
- Sights: iron sights optical sight

The IZh-56 «Belka» (ИЖ-56 «Белка») is a Soviet double-barreled combination gun.

== History ==
IZh-56 was designed in 1956 and it was based on IZhK model.

Since 1961, a new varnish with improved characteristics has been used to protect the wooden parts of the gun.

In December 1964, the price of one standard IZh-56-3 was 45 roubles.

== Design ==
IZh-56 is an over and under shotgun, with one barrel above the other.

It has a birch or beech stock and fore-end.

All IZh-56s have iron sights and they can be equipped with scope base for PVS-1 (ПВС-1) optical sight. The weight of PVS-1 scope without the scope base is 150 grams.

IZh-56-3 can be equipped with PO-2 (ПО-2) optical sight.

== Variants ==
- IZh-56-1 «Belka» (ИЖ-56-1 «Белка») - first model, since 1956 until 1958 31 903 guns were made.
- IZh-56-2 «Belka» (ИЖ-56-2 «Белка») - second model
- IZh-56-3 «Belka» (ИЖ-56-3 «Белка») - third model, since 1958 until 1964 77 043 guns were made

== Users ==
- Soviet Union
- USA - the import was allowed

== Sources ==
- Двуствольное пуледробовое ружьё "Белка". Памятка по устройству и обращению. Ижевск, 1956.
- Охотничье двуствольное пуле-дробовое ружьё "Белка" // Охотничье, спортивное огнестрельное оружие. Каталог. М., 1958. стр.38-39
- инженер А. Климов. Третья модель "Белки" // журнал «Охота и охотничье хозяйство», No. 9, сентябрь 1958. стр.36-37
- Двуствольное охотничье ружьё ИЖ-56-3 "Белка" // Спортивно-охотничье оружие и патроны. Бухарест, "Внешторгиздат", 1965. стр.52-53
- Л. Е. Михайлов, Н. Л. Изметинский. Ижевские охотничьи ружья. 2-е изд., испр. и доп. Ижевск, изд-во «Удмуртия», 1982. стр.187-193
- А. Соколов. Старые модели. ИЖ-56 - "Белка" // журнал "Охота и охотничье хозяйство", No. 6, 1991. стр.29 - ISSN 0131-2596
- Ижевское оружие. Том 1. Ижевские ружья / Н. Л. Изметинский, Л. Е. Михайлов. - Ижевск, издательство Удмуртского университета, 1995. - 247 стр. : ил.
- Алексей Булатов. ИЖ-56 "Белка" // журнал "Оружие и охота", No. 5, 2002
