= Pomazun =

Pomazun (Russian: Помазун) is an East Slavic surname. Notable people with the surname include:

- Aleksandr Pomazun (born 1971), Russian footballer
- Ilya Pomazun (born 1996), Russian footballer
- Sergey Pomazun, perpetrator of the 2013 Belgorod shooting

== See also ==
- Pomazan
