= MP-155 =

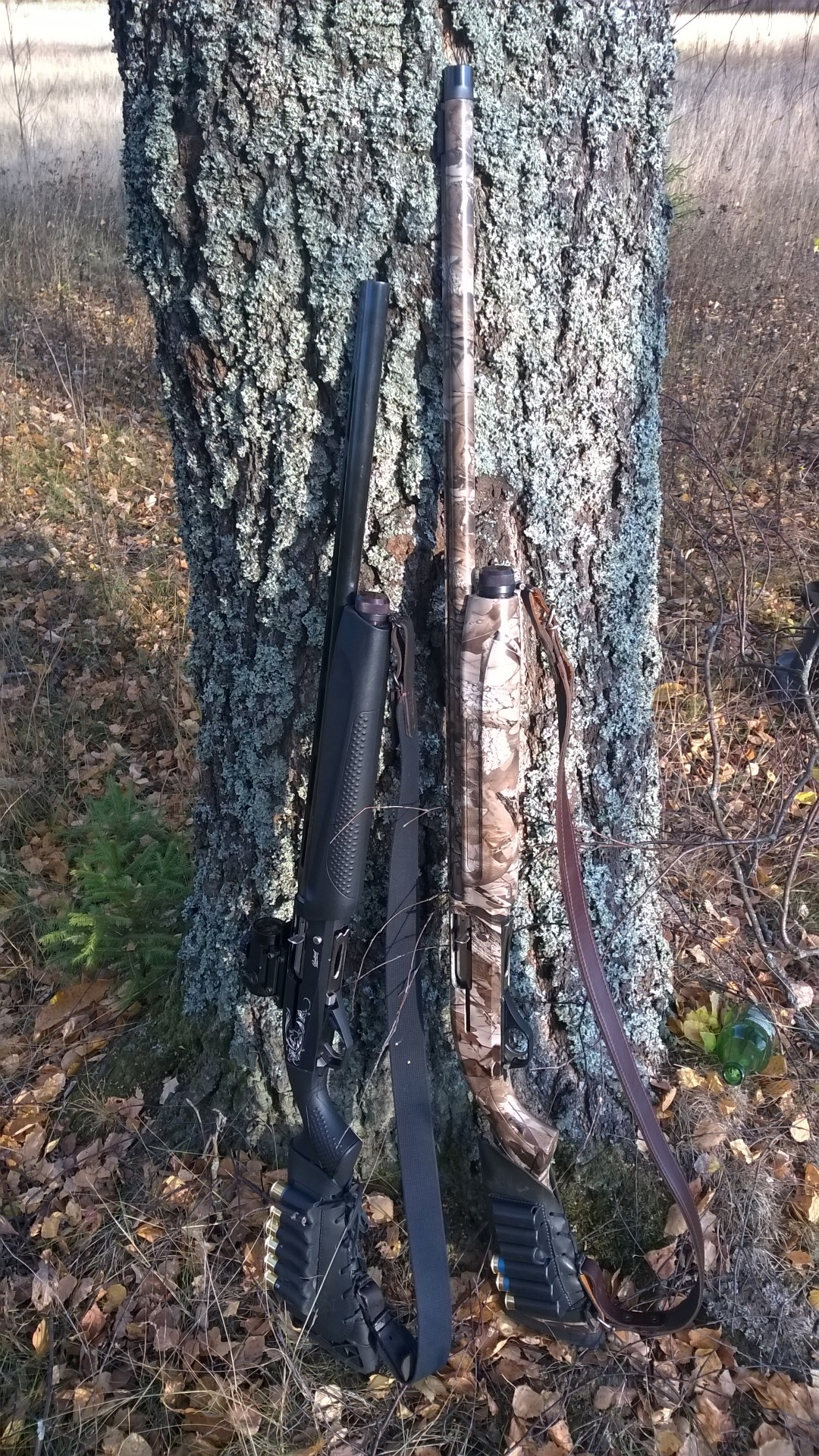
- MP-155 and MP-153 (camouflaged)
- Type: Semi-automatic shotgun
- Place of origin: Russian Federation

Production history
- Manufacturer: Izhevsk Mechanical Plant

Specifications
- Mass: 3.15-3.8 kg
- Cartridge: 12/76, 12/89, 20/76

MP-155 is a gas-operated semi-automatic shotgun manufactured by Izhevsk Mechanical Plant in Russia. It was created on the basis of MP-153 and superseded it in production.

== Description ==
MP-155 is designed for firing cartridges developing pressures up to 1050 Bar (including lead and steel shot).

Due to the use of aluminum alloys (from which the receiver is made), by placing a mechanism for adjusting the impulse of the automation engine in the gas piston (which improved the balance of the gun) and using a lightweight aiming bar (arched type), the weight of the gun was reduced compared to the MP-153.

The butt and fore-end can be made of wood (beech or walnut) or plastic.

The new model differs from MP-155 in a few ways, like length of the receiver of the 12/76 version was reduced (which provides additional weight reduction). It is also available in versions for lefthanded shooters, has dovetail mount and other improvements.

New version was presented by Kalashnikov in 2017.

== Users ==
- Russia - is allowed as civilian hunting weapon; in 2024 several MP-155 shotguns were used in Armed forces (as auxiliary weapon against low-flying UAVs).
