= Pomazan =

Pomazan (Russian: Помазан) is an East Slavic surname. Notable people include:

- Mariia Pomazan (born 1988), Ukrainian Paralympic athlete
- Roman Pomazan (born 1994), Ukrainian footballer
- Yevgeny Pomazan (born 1989), Russian footballer

== See also ==
- Pomazun
