= IZh-35 =

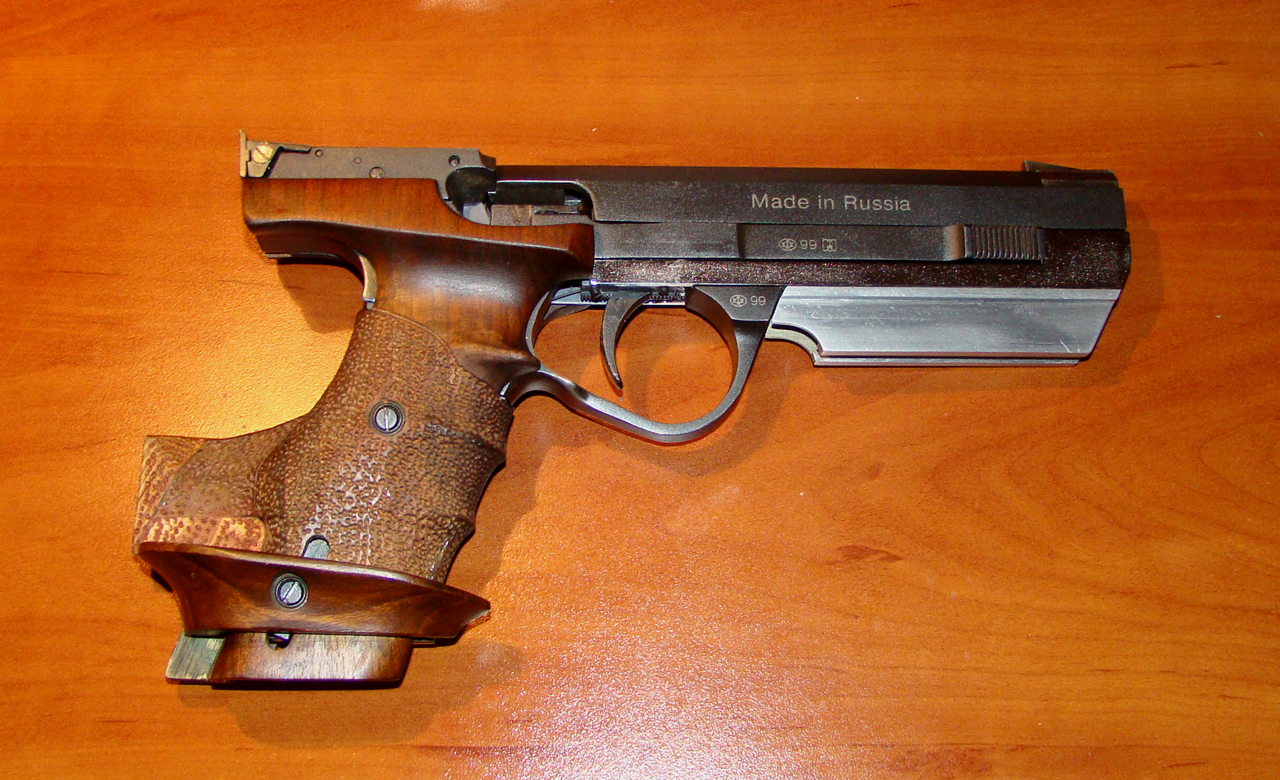
- IZh-35M
- Type: semi-automatic pistol
- Place of origin: USSR

Production history
- Designer: V. A. Yarygin
- Designed: 1973–1978
- Manufacturer: Izhevsk Mechanical Plant
- Produced: since 1978

Specifications
- Mass: 1.34 kg
- Length: 300mm
- Barrel length: 156mm
- Cartridge: .22 Short (IZh-34).22 LR (IZh-35)
- Feed system: 5-round magazine
- Sights: adjustable iron sights

The IZh-35 (ИЖ-35) is a Soviet-designed target pistol for competitive shooting sports (including the Olympic games).

== History ==
The IZh-34 and IZh-35 were designed from 1973–1978. In 1976, state tests of the first prototypes were conducted.

In 1979, IZh-34 and IZh-35 replaced previous Soviet standard sport pistols (ИЖ-ХР-30 and ИЖ-ХР-31).

In 1986 the IZh-35M was designed and began serial production in 1987.

In September 2008, all Izhevsk Mechanical Plant firearms were renamed and IZh-35M got the name MP-35M (Mechanical Plant-35M).

== Design ==
The IZh-35 is a simple blowback design constructed out of steel. The barrel is fixed to the frame.

It has detachable single column box magazine, which is inserted in the grip.

== Variants ==
- IZh-34 (ИЖ-34) - first model, 1.2 kg, .22 Short. In 1990, production was discontinued
- IZh-35 (ИЖ-35) - second model, 1.34 kg, .22 LR, serial production began in 1978
- IZh-35M (ИЖ-35M) - third model, 1.2 kg, .22 LR.
- Walther KSP 200 - IZh-35 with new pistol grip made by Carl Walther GmbH in 1998-2000

== Users ==
- Soviet Union
- Armenia: IZh-35 used as training firearm in police;
- Belarus - IZh-35M is allowed as civilian training pistol
- Kazakhstan - IZh-35M is allowed as training pistol
- Moldova - IZh-35M is allowed as training pistol
- Russian Federation - As of November 2015, almost 95% of all sport shooters in the Russian Federation used IZh-35, IZh-35M or MP-35M target pistols.
- Ukraine
- USA - the import was allowed
- Sweden - KSP 200 was used by the Swedish Armed Forces for target practice. Superseded by Pardini SP and Walther SSP.

== Sources ==
- Пистолет малокалиберный самозарядный ИЖ-35 // Охотничье и спортивное оружие, патроны. М., Внешторгиздат, 1989.
- IŽ 34M // «Střelecká revue», 5, 2017
- Спортивный стандартный самозарядный пистолет MP-35M
