= Baikal MP-153 =

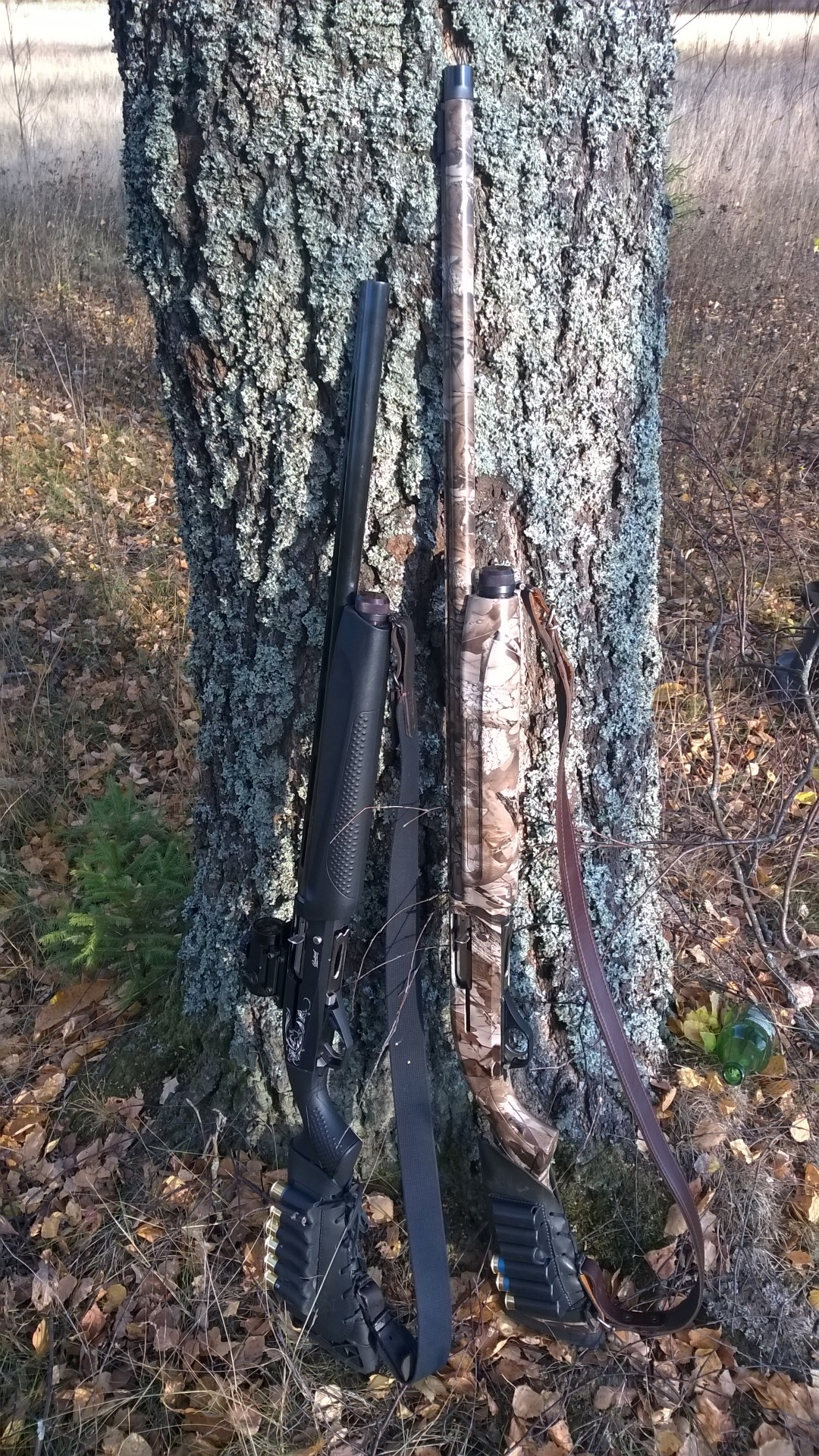
- MP-153 (right) and MP-155
- Type: Semi-automatic shotgun
- Place of origin: Russia

Production history
- Designer: Chief Designer Alexander U. Dorf
- Designed: 1997 & 1999
- Manufacturer: Kalashnikov Concern
- Produced: 2001-present
- No. built: 500,000 (2011)
- Variants: wood polymer black polymer camo

Specifications
- Mass: wood stock 3.45 kilograms (7.6 lb) polymer stock 3.5 kilograms (7.7 lb)
- Length: 1,250 millimetres (49 in) with 750 millimetres (30 in) barrel
- Barrel length: 610 millimetres (24 in) to 750 millimetres (30 in)
- Cartridge: 12 gauge
- Action: Semi-Automatic
- Feed system: Three- or five-round tubular magazine

The Baikal MP-153 is a 12 gauge gas-operated semi-automatic shotgun manufactured by Kalashnikov Concern (originally by the Izhevsk Mechanical Plant) in Russia.

The shotgun is available with 12/76mm or 12/89mm chambers and either 610, 650, 710 or 750 mm barrels.

The MP-153 is manufactured with fixed choke available as Cylinder, Modified or Full variants, or with screw in chokes with Cylinder, Improved Cylinder, Modified, Improved Modified, Full and Extra Full variants available. Normally there are 3 or 4 chokes included with multi choke variants of the shotgun and a spanner that duplicates as a choke extractor and gas screw adjustor. Screw in chokes come as lead or steel proofed versions.

== History ==
Development began in 1997 of a 12/70mm unit based on the IZh-81M. With increasing market demand for 12/89mm guns, further development of a gun capable of firing light skeet and trap load as well as heavier magnum game loads commenced in February 1999

In November 2010, 500,000 shotguns were produced, and their production continued.

The developers retained characteristics from the IZh-81:

- barrel locking by a single, retractable lug on the top of the bolt that cams into a recess cut into the barrel extension (analogous to the J.M. Browning patent) and applied in Remington 870 model and its semi-auto options;
- under-barrel tube magazine.

It has seen usage in the Russo-Ukrainian War by drone hunting units.

== Related firearms ==
- MP-133
- MP-155

== Users ==
- Armenia: used as service firearm in police;
- Belarus - is allowed as civilian hunting weapon
- Kazakhstan
- Russia
- USA - Remington Spartan 453

== Museum exhibits ==
- one MP-153 shotgun is in collection of Tula State Arms Museum in Tula Kremlin

== Sources ==
- "American Rifleman", February 2001
- Виктор Гуров, мастер спорта по стендовой стрельбе. Ижевское MP-153 на стенде и на охоте // журнал "Оружие", No. 3, 2003. стр.38-43
