= IZh-27 =

IZh-27 (MP-27)
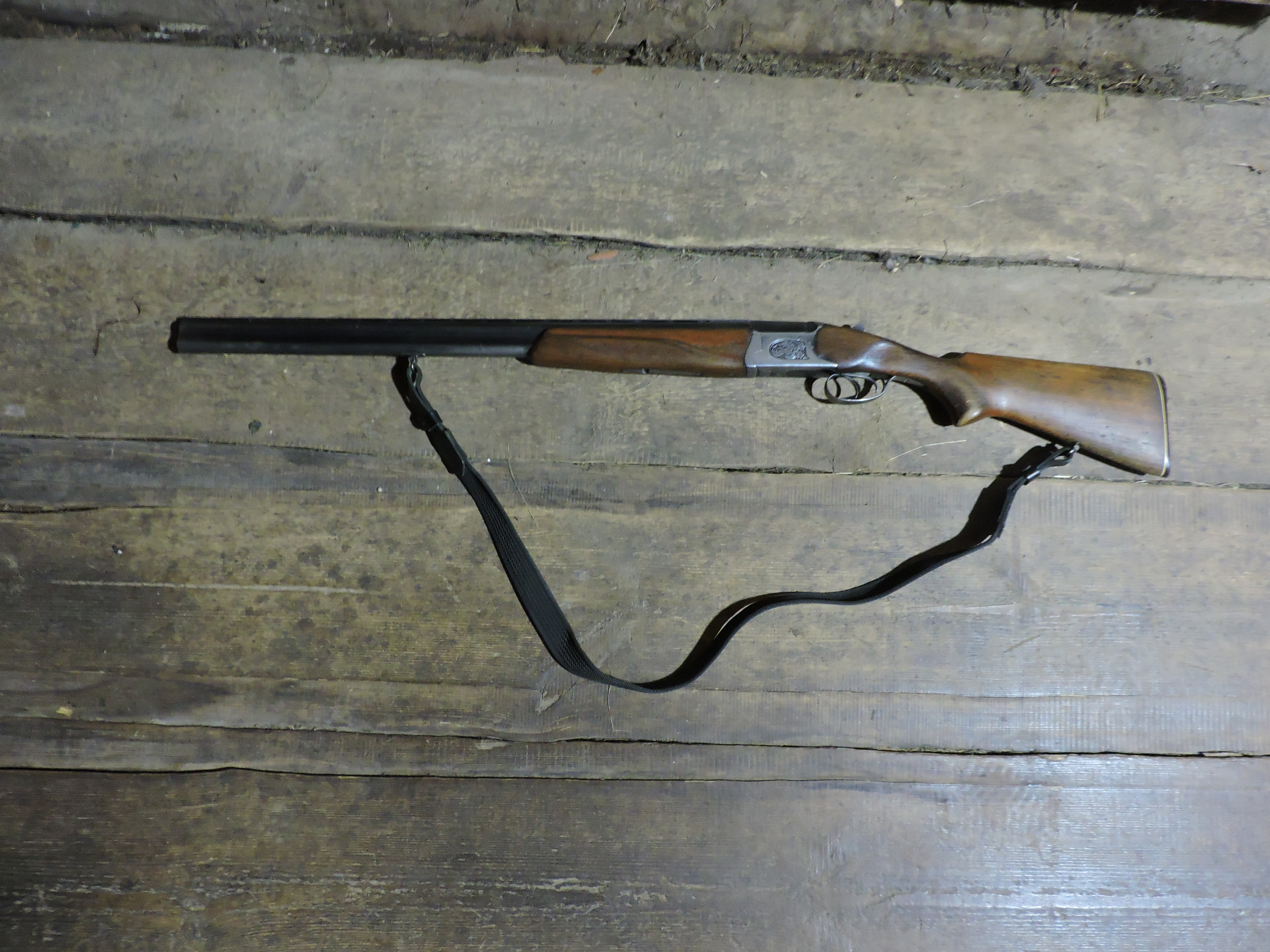
- IZH-27 16 Gauge
- Type: Double-barreled shotgun
- Place of origin: USSR

Service history
- In service: 1969–present

Production history
- Designer: A. A. Klimov
- Designed: 1969–1970
- Manufacturer: Izhevsk Mechanical Plant
- Produced: since 1972
- No. built: 2,000,000

Specifications
- Mass: 3.2–3.4 kg
- Length: 1095–1195mm
- Barrel length: 720–730mm
- Caliber: 12, 16, 20 and 32 gauge
- Action: Break-action
- Sights: iron sights

The IZh-27 is a double-barreled shotgun.

== History ==
IZh-27 was designed in the early 1970s as a successor to the IZh-12. The first standard serial shotguns were made in 1972 and mass production began in 1973.

In 1985, the IZh-27 and the TOZ-34 were the most common hunting shotguns in the Soviet Union. Also, a number of these shotguns were sold in foreign countries.

In the 1990s, the production of the IZh-27MM variant (IZh-27M chambered in 12/76 mm Magnum shotgun shells) began.

In September 2008, IZh-27 was renamed the MP-27 (Mechanical Plant – 27). Over 1.5 million IZh-27 shotguns were made.

== Design ==
IZh-27 is an over and under hammerless shotgun, with one barrel above the other.

The chrome-plated barrels are made from heat-treated 50RA steel (сталь 50PA)

It has a walnut or beech stock and fore-end. Some shotguns were equipped with a rubber recoil pad.

== Variants ==
- IZh-27 (ИЖ-27)

- IZh-27-1S (ИЖ-27-1С) with a single selective trigger

- IZh-27E (ИЖ-27Е), with automatic ejectors – since 1973

- IZh-27E-1S (ИЖ-27Е-1С), with automatic ejectors and a single selective trigger – in 1976 it was awarded the golden medal of the Brno Exhibition and in spring 1977 it received the State quality mark of the USSR.

- IZh-27ST (ИЖ-27СТ), with 760mm barrels 3.3 – 3.4 kg
- IZh-27SK (ИЖ-27СK), with 660mm barrels 3.2 – 3.3 kg
- IZh-27M (ИЖ-27М) In September 2008, it was renamed into MP-27M
- IZh-27MM (ИЖ-27МM) Variant that allows the user to shoot 12 x 76 mm Magnum cartridges.

== Users ==
- USSR - was allowed as civilian hunting weapon
- Belarus – is allowed as civilian hunting weapon
- Bulgaria
- Kazakhstan – is allowed as civilian hunting weapon
- Moldova – is allowed as civilian hunting weapon
- Russian Federation – is allowed as civilian hunting weapon
- USA – European American Armory began importing IZh-27 shotguns from Russia in 1999. In January 2004, a contract was signed between Remington Arms (Madison, North Carolina) and the Izhevsk Mechanical Plant. In 2005 Remington Arms began importing IZh-27 shotguns from Russia, marketed and distributed as the Remington Spartan 310. Remington ceased importing the shotgun in 2009.

== Criminal use ==
- A Baikal IJ-27E (a rebrand of the IZh-27) was one of the three firearms used by Philip Manshaus in the 2019 Bærum murder and mosque attack.
- A stolen IZh-27 was used by Ruslan Akhtyamov during the 2022 Veshkayma kindergarten shooting, which left five dead, including himself and the gun's original owner, and another person wounded.

== Sources ==
- Universal/Baikal IJ-27E shotgun // "American Rifleman", December 1975
- Н. Изметинский, Л. Михайлов. ИЖ-27Е-27-1С – охотничье ружье с одним спуском // журнал «Охота и охотничье хозяйство», No. 9, 1978. стр.30–32
- Л. Е. Михайлов, Н. Л. Изметинский. Ижевские охотничьи ружья. 2-е изд., испр. и доп. Ижевск, изд-во «Удмуртия», 1982. стр.160–187
- В. Н. Трофимов. Отечественные охотничьи ружья гладкоствольные. М., ДАИРС, 2000. стр.267–280
- Виктор Гордиенко. Главный калибр российского охотника // журнал «Мастер-ружьё», No. 1 (50), 2001. стр.112–117
- Baikal IZH-27 // "American Rifleman", May 2001
