= Remington Spartan 453 =

- Type: Semi-automatic shotgun
- Place of origin: Russia

Production history
- Designer: Konstantin Evseev
- Designed: 1999
- Manufacturer: Izhevsk Mechanical Plant
- Produced: 2006–2008 (U.S. import)

Specifications
- Mass: 8.25 pounds (3.74 kg) (28" barrel)
- Length: 49.5 inches (126 cm) (28" barrel)
- Barrel length: 24, 26, or 28 inches (61, 66, or 71 cm)
- Cartridge: 12 gauge (up to 3½" length)
- Action: Semi-automatic gas operated
- Feed system: 4+1 tube magazine
- Sights: Bead

The Remington Spartan 453, also known as the SPR 453, is a gas operated semi-automatic shotgun. It is an American import of the Russian-made Baikal MP-153, manufactured by Izhevsk Mechanical Plant in Izhevsk, Russia. It was marketed and distributed by Remington Arms, who ceased importing the shotgun to the United States in 2008.

The SPR 453 is inexpensive compared to other semi-automatic shotguns. It is most often used for hunting birds, and for clay pigeon shooting sports, such as trap and skeet. It is chambered for 12 gauge shells, in lengths of 2 3/4 to 3 1/2 inches (7.0 to 8.9 cm). Several versions of the SPR 453 were marketed, including one using Mossy Oak "New Break-Up" camouflage.

It has seen usage in the Russo-Ukrainian War by drone hunting units.
