= MP-446 Viking =

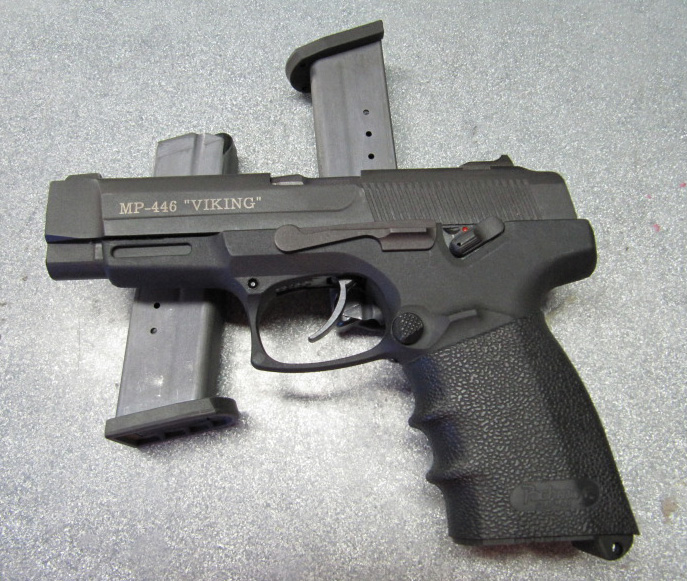
- MP-446 Viking with 2 magazines and Pachmayr grip
- Type: Semi-automatic pistol
- Place of origin: Russia

Production history
- Designer: Izhevsk Mechanical Plant
- Designed: 1998–2000
- Manufacturer: Izhevsk Mechanical Plant (2001–2013); Kalashnikov Concern (2013–present)
- Produced: 2001–present

Specifications
- Mass: 830 g (29 oz)
- Length: 196 mm (7.7 in)
- Barrel length: 112.8 mm (4.4 in)
- Width: 38 mm (1.5 in)
- Height: 142 mm (5.6 in)
- Cartridge: 9×19mm Parabellum
- Action: Short recoil operated, locked breech
- Muzzle velocity: 335 m/s (1,100 ft/s)
- Effective firing range: 50 m (55 yd)
- Feed system: 10 or 18 round detachable box magazine
- Sights: Fixed iron sights, 3-dot with notch and front blade

The MP-446 Viking is a 9mm semi-automatic handgun originating from Russia.

== Design ==
The MP-446 Viking was created by the Izhevsk Mechanical Plant as the civilian version of the MP-443 Grach Yarygin PYa pistol used by the Russian military since 2003.

The MP-446 is a short recoil-operated, locked breech pistol. It weighs around 830 grams (29 oz) when unloaded, and has a magazine capacity of 18 rounds.

The key differences between MP-446 and MP-443 are the frame materials (polyamide rather than steel) and barrel construction: the barrel of the MP-446 was intentionally weakened to prevent the safe use of high-powered armour-piercing military rounds (i.e. Russian 9x19mm 7N21 type, 9x19mm NATO) or civilian "+P" or "+P+" cartridges. Because of this, the barrel has a noticeable taper beginning at the chamber end and widening toward the muzzle where material was removed to reduce its strength.

== Variants ==
=== MP-446 Viking ===
The export variant comes with either a 10-round or 18-round double-column, two position feed box magazine.

==== MP-446C Viking ====
Sport modification of МР-446 "Viking" pistol.

It was developed according to the requirements of the International Practical Shooting Confederation (IPSC).

In 2003, the МР-446С "Viking" was included in the official list of weapons used in international competitions according to IPSC rules.

It has an upgraded shooting accuracy and patterning in comparison with a base variant; opportunity to adjust trigger travel after a shot; adjustable sights; 120 mm (4.7 in) barrel length version is available.

==== MP-446C Viking-M ====
Improved version of the MP-446C, with considerations for modern civilian markets, such as a standard Picatinny rail on the underside of the frame, removable sights that are compatible with aftermarket Glock examples, a longer barrel likely for the option of threading for aftermarket devices with reinforcement in stressful areas, increased part durability to a claimed 50,000 rounds, improved feed ramp, and improved magazines while retaining the ability to function with older examples.

== Users ==
- Armenia: used as service pistol in police; since June 10, 2021, the Armenian government authorized the use of MP-446 pistols as firearms for customs service personnel
- Belarus
  - Adopted as training pistol
- Islamic Republic of Afghanistan (former)
- Kazakhstan
  - Since 2003 adopted as training pistol
- Pakistan
- Russian Federation
- Syria

== Museum exhibits ==
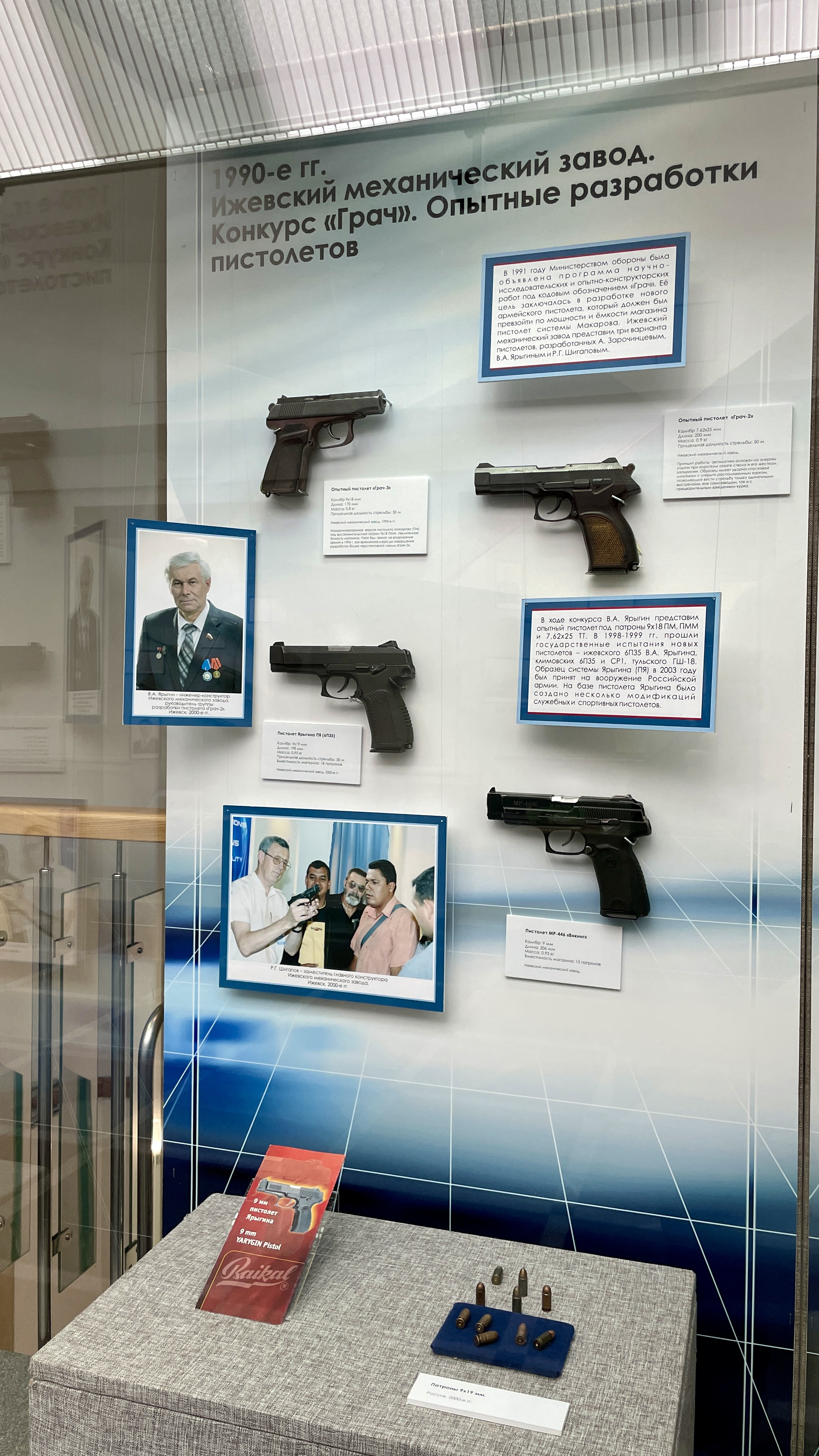
A MP-446 "Viking" pistol in the collection of M. T. Kalashnikov Museum in Izhevsk

A MP-446 "Viking" pistol is in the collection of M. T. Kalashnikov Museum in Izhevsk

== Sources ==
- Pistole MP-446 Viking // "Střelecký Magazin", № 2, 2004
- Ивица Дамески. Руски пиштол „МП 446 Викинг“ // "Штит", № 103, маj 2018. стр.32-33
