= P-96 pistol =

P-96
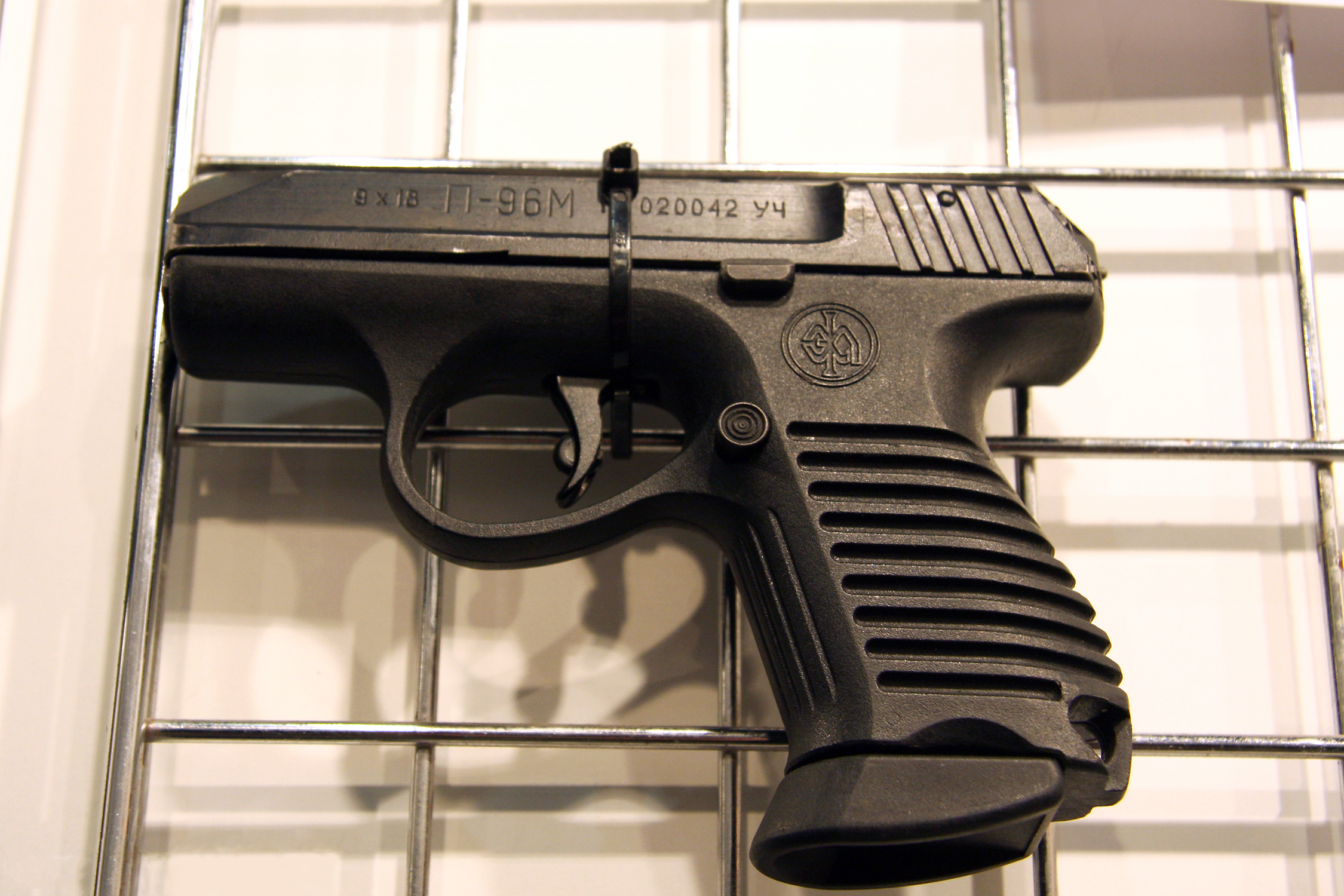
- P-96M at Interpolitex-2009
- Type: Semi-automatic pistol
- Place of origin: Russia

Service history
- In service: 2002
- Used by: Russia

Production history
- Designer: V.P. Gryazev
- Designed: 1996
- Manufacturer: KBP Instrument Design Bureau
- Produced: 1998
- Variants: See Variants

Specifications
- Mass: 460 g (P-96M); 450 g (P-96S)
- Length: 152 mm (P-96M); 151 mm (P-96S)
- Barrel length: 68 mm (P-96M); 67 mm (P-96S)
- Width: 31 mm
- Height: 118 mm (P-96M); 106 mm (P-96S)
- Cartridge: 9×19mm Parabellum (P-96); 9×18mm Makarov (P-96M).380 ACP (9x17mm Short) (P-96S)
- Action: Short recoil, rotary barrel
- Muzzle velocity: 315 m/s (P-96M); 270 m/s (P-96S)
- Effective firing range: 50 m (P-96M); 25 m (P-96S)
- Feed system: 18-round detachable box magazine (P-96); 14-round detachable box magazine (P-96M); 10-round detachable box magazine (P-96S)
- Sights: Fixed; rear notch, front blade

The P-96 (Russian: П-96) is a Russian 9 mm semi-automatic pistol designed by the KBP Instrument Design Bureau. It was originally designed under the leadership of V.P. Gryazev for the Russian Armed Forces. Having been rejected by the military, its design was modified and offered to law enforcement and security firms as the P-96M and P-96S respectively.

== Design Details ==
The original P-96 was chambered in 9×19mm Parabellum. The P-96M is chambered for 9×18mm Makarov. It can fire the 7N25 armor-piercing round, capable of penetrating 5mm of steel at up to 15m. The P-96S is chambered instead in 9×17mm (.380 ACP) and uses 10-round magazines.

Like the related GSh-18, the P-96 is striker-fired and operates by short recoil with a rotating barrel. It uses a double-stack double-feed magazine, feeding cartridges directly from both sides. The trigger features an automatic safety to prevent the weapon from firing unless it is pulled intentionally, allowing it to be safely carried with a round chambered. The magazine release is placed on the left side of the grip.

The P-96's frame is constructed from polymer, making it corrosion resistant and comfortable to use in cold environments due to its low thermal conductivity. Combined with a lightweight slide enabled by the short-recoil system, the P-96M is significantly lighter than other comparable designs.

== Variants ==
- P-96 "Efa"(П-96 "Эфа") - Original version in 9×19mm. First pistol was made in 1996. It never entered into the mass production.
- P-96M (П-96М) - 9×18mm version. The production began in 2003. It is used in law enforcement.
- P-96S (П-96С) - 9×17mm version. It is used in Ministry of Internal Affairs, postal security guards and private security companies.
- PTT (ПТТ) - Prototype, 9mm non-lethal pistol (version of P-96S chambered for the non-lethal 9mm P.A. ammunition with rubber bullets).

== Users ==
- Russia: Adopted with the 7N25 round by the Ministry of Internal Affairs in 2005.

== Museum exhibits ==
- One P-96S pistol is in the collection of M. T. Kalashnikov Museum in Izhevsk.

== See Also ==
- GSh-18 - Closely related KBP design

== Sources ==
- 9х18 мм пистолет П-96М. Инструкция по эксплуатации П-96М.00.000 ДЭИ
- 9х18 мм пистолет П-96М. Паспорт П-96М.00.000 ПС
- А.Б. Жук. Энциклопедия стрелкового оружия: револьверы, пистолеты, винтовки, пистолеты-пулеметы, автоматы. М., АСТ - Воениздат, 2002. стр.440-441
- Михаил Дегтярёв. П-96С - мал, да удал // журнал "Калашников. Оружие. Боеприпасы. Снаряжение", No. 1, 2000
