= MP-461 =

Russian non-lethal pistol

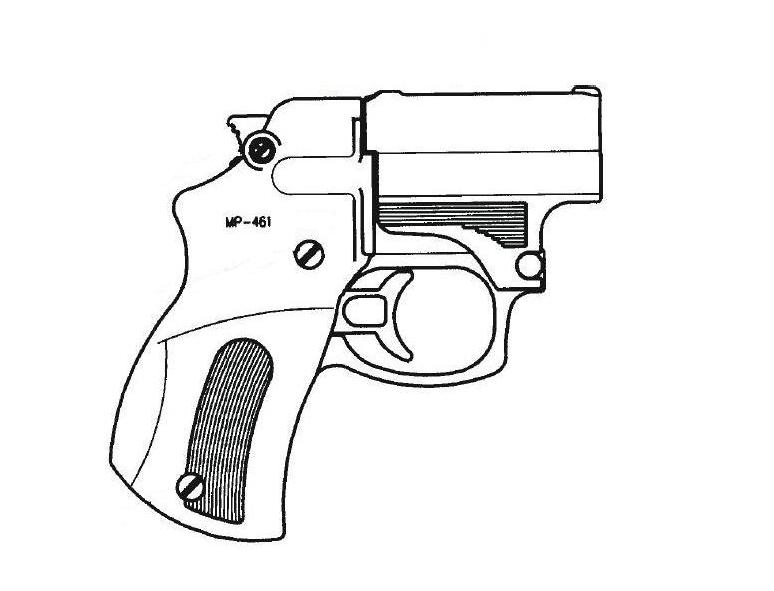
- Type: Non-lethal handgun
- Place of origin: Russia

Service history
- In service: Current

Production history
- Produced: since 2002

Specifications
- Mass: 0.172 kg
- Length: 118 mm
- Width: 30 mm
- Cartridge: 18×45 mm
- Caliber: 18 mm
- Barrels: 2
- Action: break action
- Feed system: 2-round chamber
- Sights: simple iron sights

The MP-461 (Mechanical Plant-461) is a Russian compact non-lethal pistol.

== History ==
The gun was designed in early 2000s. In January 2002 Izhevsk Mechanical Plant announced name and photo of new MP-461 pistol. In March 2002, the prototype was presented at the "IWA-2002" exhibition in Nuremberg and offered for export.

In November 2002, this pistol was shown at the "INTERPOLITEX-2002" exhibition in Moscow and plant started its serial production.

Since 2007 MP-461 are equipped with laser designator.

== Design ==
The MP-461 is a two-barreled break-action gun. It has two vertical chambers in its detachable chamber block.

== Users ==
- Kazakhstan – it is used by private security guards
- Kyrgyzstan – since June 27, 2002 is allowed as self-defense weapon for civil population
- Russia – The use of non-lethal weapons in Russia is permitted to civil population, and it is also used by private security and law enforcement units.

== Sources ==
- Михаил Драгунов. Стражник. Второе пришествие // журнал «Калашников. Оружие. Боеприпасы. Снаряжение», No. 12, 2005. стр.38-41
- "Стражник" в кармане // журнал "Мастер-ружьё", No. 12 (129), декабрь 2007. стр.78-79
- Сергей Монетчиков. Арсенал: современное российское служебное и гражданское оружие самообороны // журнал «Братишка», июль 2008
