= OTs-21 Malysh =

- Type: Semi-automatic pistol
- Place of origin: Russia

Service history
- In service: 2006
- Used by: Russia

Production history
- Designer: Y. I. Berezin = KBP Instrument Design Bureau
- Designed: 1994
- Manufacturer: Izhmash
- Variants: OTs-21S

Specifications
- Mass: 565 g (19.9 oz) (OTs-21); 550 g (19 oz) (OTs-21S)
- Length: 126 mm (5.0 in)
- Width: 20 mm (0.8 in)
- Height: 100 mm (3.9 in)
- Cartridge: 9×18mm Makarov (OTs-21).380 ACP (9x17mm Short) (OTs-21S)
- Action: Straight blowback
- Effective firing range: 10 m (10.9 yd)
- Maximum firing range: 25 m (27.3 yd)
- Feed system: 5-round detachable box magazine
- Sights: Single groove on the slide

The OTs-21 Malysh (Russian: ОЦ-21 «Малыш», meaning "kid") is a 9 mm semi-automatic pistol designed by the KBP Instrument Design Bureau for special applications where concealment is a key priority.

The Malysh operates on the simple blowback principle; it is a double action only design with the ammunition capacity limited to five 9×18mm Makarov rounds (can use only 57-N-181S cartridges) in a box magazine with a base extension for more comfortable holding and firing. It features an internal hammer and there are no protrusions to hinder rapid withdrawal from a pocket or holster. The pistol has no safety other than the need for a definite pressure on the trigger. There are also no sights other than a groove along the top of the slide, emphasizing the intention that the OTs-21 Malysh is limited to very short-range engagements.

== Variants ==
- OTs-21 (ОЦ-21) - 9×18mm Makarov version
- OTs-21S (ОЦ-21С) - 9x17mm version
- OTs-26 (ОЦ-26 «Малыш») - 5.45x18mm version

== Users ==
- Armenia: used as service pistol in police;
- Russia - used in law enforcement

== See also ==
- List of Russian weaponry
