= 2007 Balashikha shooting =

Mass shooting in Russia

- Location of Moscow Oblast in Russia
- Location: Balashikha, Moscow Oblast, Russia
- Date: 23 April 2007; 12:00 a.m.
- Target: Nina Kuznetsova
- Attack type: Spree shooting, mass murder
- Weapon: Handmade pistol
- Deaths: 4
- Injuries: 0
- Perpetrator: Alexandr Lyovin
- Motive: Contract killing
- Given life sentence

The 2007 Balashikha shooting was a mass murder that occurred on 23 April 2007, in Balashikha, Moscow Oblast, Russia, where four people were shot and killed by Alexandr Lyovin, who was arrested and sentenced to life imprisonment.

== Perpetrator ==
Alexander Lyovin (Александр Лёвин) was a 31-year-old career criminal, described as a "bandit", and was a resident of Balashikha. Lyovin had repeatedly been in trouble with law enforcement in the past, and at the time of the shooting had recently been released from prison. Lyovin was a recidivist, and shortly after his release was hired as a contract killer.

== Shooting ==
At 12:00 a.m., on April 23, 2007, Lyovin went to the apartment building at 8 Krupskoy Street in Balashikha, where his contract ordered him to shoot 49-year-old Nina Kuznetsova (Нина Кузнецова) who lived in apartment 15. Armed with a handmade pistol featuring an improvised suppressor that had been provided to him, Alexander went to Kuznetsova's apartment at and rang the doorbell. Kuznetsova saw the weapon as she answered the door and tried to escape, but Lyovin shot her in the head and killed her. As he attempted to flee, Lyovin suddenly encountered 30-year-old Valida Halilova (Валида Халилова) who saw his weapon, and fatally shot her as she ran away. Lyovin then ran downstairs and saw 43-year-old Sergey Glashko (Сергей Глашко) and shot him dead while still attempting to escape. Near the exit, Lyovin saw 70-year-old Lidiya Vasilyeva (Лидия Васильева) and shot her dead too.

== Arrest and conviction ==
After that Lyovin escaped from 8 Krupskoy Street, footage of the shooting was found to have been captured on a video camera. Panic spread across the small city of Balashikha, and local police directed all available resources towards investigating the shooting. Lyovin was arrested on May 4, 2007, and on June 5, 2008, was sentenced to life in prison.
