= MP-443 Grach =

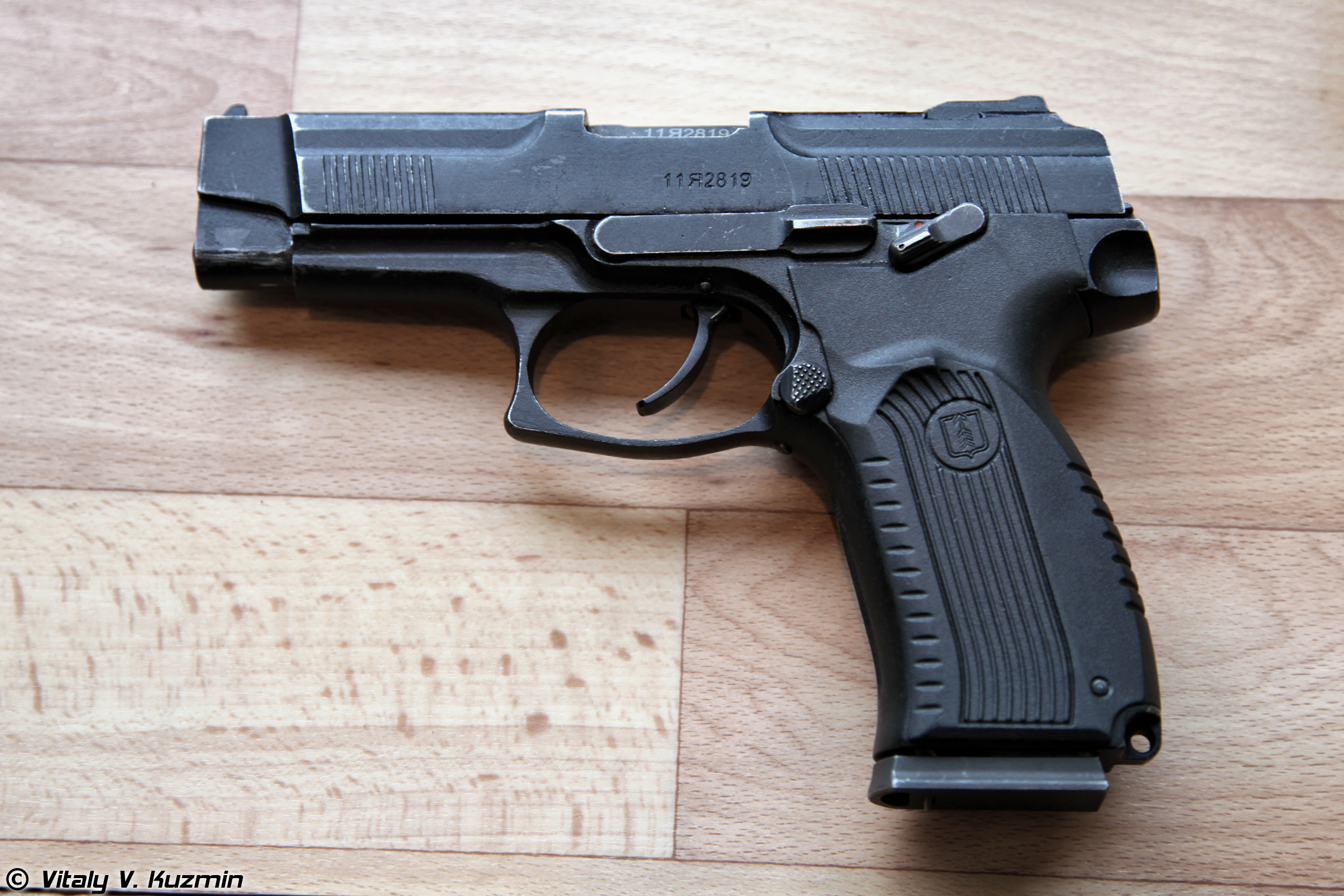
- MP-443 Grach Pistol
- Type: Semi-automatic pistol
- Place of origin: Russia

Service history
- In service: 2003–present
- Wars: Second Chechen War; Russo-Georgian War; Syrian Civil War; Russo-Ukrainian War

Production history
- Designer: V. A. Yarygin
- Designed: 1993–2000
- Manufacturer: Izhevsk Mechanical Plant (2003–2013); Kalashnikov Concern (2013–present)
- Produced: 2003–present
- No. built: more than 250,000 as of March 2023 (including civilian modifications)
- Variants: MP-446 Viking

Specifications
- Mass: 950 g (34 oz) (MP-443 Grach); 870 g (31 oz) (MP-446 Viking)
- Length: 198 mm (7.8 in)
- Barrel length: 112.5 mm (4.4 in) (MP-443 Grach); 112.8 mm (4.4 in) (MP-446 Viking)
- Width: 38 mm (1.5 in)
- Height: 140 mm (5.5 in) (MP-443 Grach); 145 mm (5.7 in) (MP-446 Viking)
- Cartridge: 9×19mm Parabellum; 9×19mm 7N21 +P+
- Caliber: 9×19mm
- Action: Short recoil, locked breech
- Rate of fire: 40–45 rounds/min
- Muzzle velocity: 450 m/s (1,470 ft/s)
- Effective firing range: 50 m (55 yd)
- Feed system: 17-round detachable box magazine. After 2004 produced with magazines for 18 rounds.
- Sights: Fixed iron sights, 3-dot with notch and front blade

The MP-443 Grach (Note: ⟨MP⟩ stands for "Mechanical Plant", translation of "Механический завод", and is rendered in Latin script even in Russian sources. Some Western sources, however, misinterpret it as Cyrillic ⟨МР⟩, and transliterate as "MR".) (Russian: MП-443 Грач, lit. 'rook') or "PYa", for "Pistolet Yarygina" ("Yarygin Pistol") (Russian: ПЯ, Пистолет Ярыгина), is a Russian 9mm semi-automatic pistol.

== Development ==
The development was headed by the designer Vladimir Alexandrovich Yarygin. It was developed under the designation "Grach" in response to Russian military trials, which began in 1993.

In 2003, it was adopted as one of the standard sidearms for all branches of Russian military and law enforcement, alongside the Makarov, GSh-18, and SPS. Mass production of PYa pistols started in 2011.

== Design ==
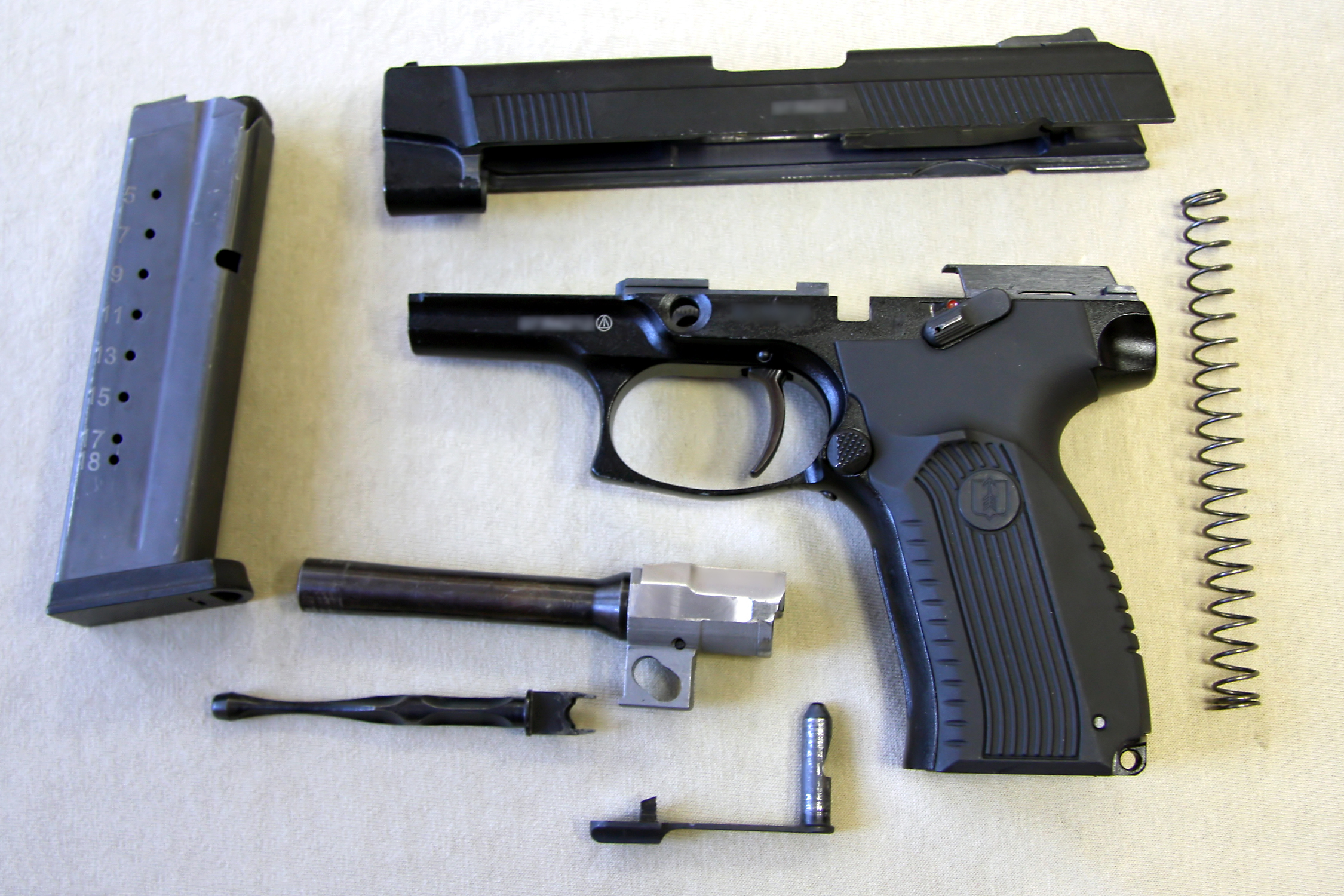
An MP-443 Grach field stripped to its main parts

The PYa is a double-action, short-recoil semi-automatic pistol.

=== Composition ===
Even though the grips of the pistol are polymer, the weapon is largely made of metal (stainless steel for the barrel, carbon steel for the frame and slide).

=== Operation ===
Its barrel/slide locking is a simplified Colt–Browning design, similar to that found in many modern pistols (e.g. the SIG Sauer and Glock families of pistols).

The breech end of the barrel is rectangular in shape, rather than rounded, and fits into matching locking grooves within the slide, near the ejection port.

The slide stop lever can be mounted on either side of the weapon to accommodate both left- and right-handed users.

=== Safety ===
The manual safety is ambidextrous, with safety catches on both sides of the weapon, where it is manipulated by the thumb. Despite the trigger being double-action/single-action, the safety does not act as a decocker.

The safety is mounted on the frame, below the rear slide grooves, and directly behind the slide stop lever. The hammer is partially concealed at the sides to prevent catching on clothes and equipment.

The magazine release catch is located in the base of the trigger guard on the left side, where it can be manipulated with the thumb (right-handed users) or index or middle finger (left-handed users).

=== Sights ===
The front sight is formed as a fixed part of the slide and is non-adjustable.

The back sight is drift adjustable for windage (dovetail type), but this requires a tool.

Both feature white contrast elements to ease aiming in low-light conditions.

=== Magazine ===
The standard magazine capacity is 17 rounds, fed from a double-column, two position feed magazine. Magazines with an 18-round capacity were produced after 2004.

=== Ammunition ===
It is chambered for the 9×19mm 7N21 cartridge, the Russian loading of the ubiquitous 9mm NATO pistol cartridge, which is broadly equivalent to NATO standard loadings, loaded to comparable pressure specifications.

The 7N21 features a semi-armour-piercing bullet with a tempered steel core.

The weapon can also use standard 9×19mm Parabellum/9mm Luger/9×19mm NATO cartridges, including civilian loads such as hollowpoints for law enforcement (only full metal jacket bullets are permitted for use in military weapons).

=== Accessories ===
English	Russian	Description
Mount B-8	крепление Б-8	Dismountable Weaver rail mount
2KS+LCU Mini-mite	2КС+ЛЦУ мини-Клещ"	Combination gun-mounted tactical light and laser sight which can be mounted below the barrel.

== Variants ==
=== MP-446 Viking ===
Civilian version of the Grach with a magazine capacity of 17 or 18 rounds. 10-round magazines are available for jurisdictions with restrictive magazine capacity laws.

It is identical to the Grach, except it is not designed to take high-powered +P and +P+ rounds like the 9×19mm 7N21, and is usually polyamide framed.

==== MP-446C Viking ====
Civilian version designed for competition.

=== MP-353 ===
Civilian version.

Non-lethal pistol which fires only ammunition with rubber bullets.

=== MP-472 ===
Non-lethal pistol.

== Users ==
- Armenia: used as service pistol in police; since June 10, 2021, the Armenian government authorized the use of MP-443 pistols as firearms for customs service personnel
- Kazakhstan: Since 2007 used as service pistol in private security companies.
- Russia: In 2003 it was adopted as a standard sidearm for all branches of Armed Forces of the Russian Federation; fielding continues as of 2021. Since September 2006 used as a pistol in law enforcement, though it never fully replaced the Makarov PM. It is adopted as a standard sidearm for special police units (SOBR) and rapid response units of riot police (OMON). As of 2015, it is the service pistol of the Russian Airborne Troops. Since 2018 it is supplied to the National Guard of Russia.
- Ukraine: Some reportedly captured by Ukrainian soldiers and are in use.

== See also ==
- List of Russian weaponry
- Beretta M9
- CZ 99
- Udav

== Sources ==
- Оружие, которое нам выбирают. // журнал "Мастер-ружьё", № 54, 2001. стр.54-58
- Ireneusz Chloupek. Następca Makarowa. // „Komandos”. nr 11 (109), 2001. str. 71-75.
- Ю. Пономарёв. Новобранец «Ярыгин» // журнал «Калашников. Оружие, боеприпасы, снаряжение» № 6, 2003. стр.6-14
