= GSh-18 =

GSh-18 (ГШ-18)
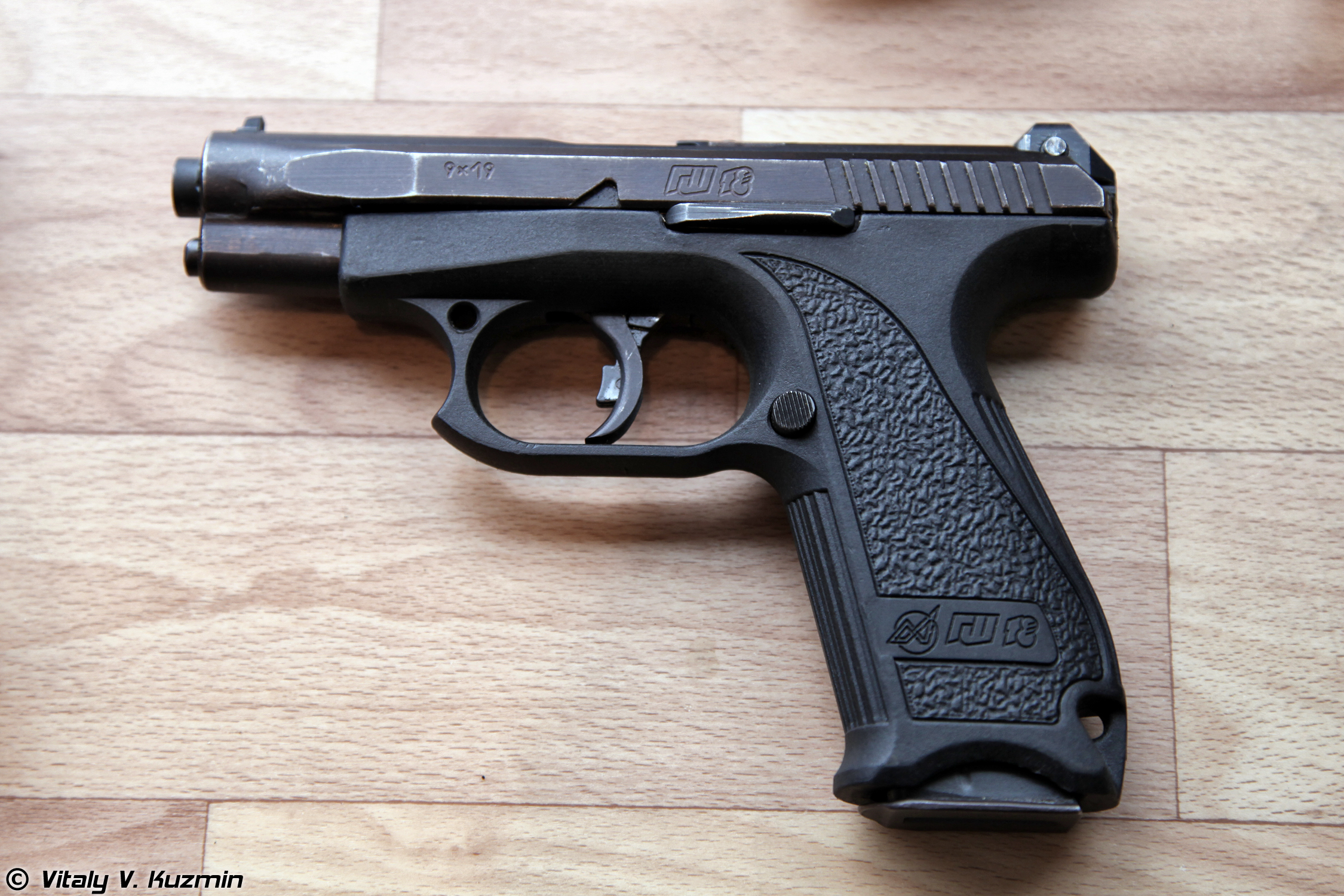
- Gryazev and Shipunov 9mm GSh-18 pistol
- Type: Semi-automatic pistol
- Place of origin: Russia

Service history
- In service: 2000–present
- Wars: Second Chechen War; Russo-Georgian War; Syrian Civil War; Russo-Ukrainian War

Production history
- Designer: V.P. Gryazev; A.G. Shipunov
- Designed: 1998–2000
- Manufacturer: KBP Instrument Design Bureau
- Unit cost: 14,810 roubles (2008); 23,314.44 roubles (2012)
- Produced: 2001–present
- Variants: various civilian versions

Specifications
- Mass: 590 g (21 oz)
- Length: 184 mm (7.2 in)
- Barrel length: 103 mm (4.1 in)
- Width: 34 mm (1.3 in)
- Height: 136 mm (5.4 in)
- Cartridge: 9×19mm Parabellum; 9×19mm 7N21 +P+ 9×19mm 7N31 +P+
- Action: Short recoil, rotating barrel striker fired
- Muzzle velocity: 535 m/s (1,755 ft/s)–570 m/s (1,870.1 ft/s)
- Effective firing range: 50 m (55 yd)
- Feed system: 18-round detachable box magazine
- Sights: Fixed; front blade and rear notch

The GSh-18 (Russian: ГШ-18) is a 9mm semi-automatic pistol developed by the KBP Instrument Design Bureau in Tula during the 1990s.

== History ==
The GSh-18 entered service in 2000 with the Russian Ministry of Justice. It was only in 2003 that the pistol was widely adopted under Decree of the Government of the Russian Federation No. 166.

The pistol's name is derived from its designers—Gryazev and Shipunov—and its magazine capacity of 18 rounds.

== Design details ==
=== Operation ===
The GSh-18 is a rotating-barrel, short recoil, locked-breech pistol with 10 locking lugs spaced equally around the barrel, the large locking surface area resulting in a strong lockup, making it suitable for high-velocity ammunition loads.

The pistol incorporates a pre-set striker. Two different designs of grip have been observed. The slide and working parts are steel, and the weapon has a polymer frame.

=== Ammunition ===
The GSh-18 is designed to fire standard 9×19mm Parabellum as well as the Russian 9×19mm 7N21 (Cyrillic: 7Н21) and 7N31 (Cyrillic: 7Н31) +P+ armor-piercing rounds. The 7N31, has demonstrated a penetration of 8 mm (0.31 in) of steel at a distance of 15–20 m (16–22 yd).

The magazines are a double-stack, double-feed magazine design common to modern Russian military handguns. The magazine capacity is 18 rounds, and an additional round may be carried in the chamber. The magazine release is reversible for left-handed shooters, and the extractor doubles as a loaded chamber indicator.

== Variants ==
=== GSh-18 ===
GRAU index 6P54

=== GSh-18 Tactical ===
GSh-18 fitted with a Picatinny rail, a new receiver and the ability to attach a suppressor. Officially revealed in 2012.

=== GSh-18S «Sport» ===
Civilian version (Russian: ГШ-18С «Спорт») with modified trigger and firing pin and 10-round detachable box magazine.

=== GSh-18 «Sport 2» ===
Civilian version (Russian: ГШ-18С «Спорт 2») with modified trigger and 18-round detachable box magazine

=== GSh-18T ===
Non-lethal version (Russian: ГШ-18Т) using MP-80-13т .45 rubber bullets.

== Users ==
- Russia
  - Armed Forces of the Russian Federation
  - National Guard of Russia
  - Ministry of Justice
  - Ministry of Internal Affairs
  - Law enforcement in Russia
- Syria
  - Syrian Armed Forces
  - Law enforcement in Syria

== See also ==
- MP-443 Grach

== Sources ==
- Михаил Дегтярев. Правнук «Токарева» // журнал «Калашников. Оружие. Боеприпасы. Снаряжение», No. 1, 2001 г. стр.10-18
- 9-миллиметровый пистолет ГШ-18 // журнал «Солдат удачи», No. 5 (80), 2001. стр.24-25
- 9х19 мм пистолет ГШ-18. Руководство по эксплуатации
