= Izhevsk Mechanical Plant =

Soviet and Russian gun manufacturer (1942–2013)

- Company type: Unitary enterprise
- Industry: Defense
- Predecessor: Plant 622
- Founded: Izhevsk, USSR July 20, 1942; 83 years ago
- Founder: State Defense Committee
- Defunct: 2013
- Fate: Merged with Izhmash to form Kalashnikov Concern
- Headquarters: Izhevsk, Russia
- Products: Firearms, air guns
- Revenue: ▲US$ 94,867,462 (2009)
- Net income: ▲US$ 225,315 (2009)
- Number of employees: 11,633 (January 2010)
- Parent: Ministry of Industry and Trade
- Subsidiaries: Trading House "Baikal"
- Website: imzcorp.com

Izhevsk Mechanical Plant (Russian: Ижевский Механический Завод, Izhevsky Mekhanicheskiy Zavod) or IZHMEKH (ИЖМЕХ) was a major firearms manufacturer founded in Izhevsk in 1942 for manufacturing small arms for the USSR.

In 2013, it merged with Izhmash to form Kalashnikov Concern.

== History ==
It was one of the primary factories producing Mosin–Nagant and SVT-40 rifles during World War II for standard issue to Soviet troops.

After the end of World War II, it continued producing firearms, both for military (Makarov pistols) and hunting applications, and later high-tech weapons and civilian machinery.

In 1948, the plant began production of Margolin pistols.

In 1956, the plant began production of IZh-56 combination guns.

Since 1960, Izhmekh supplied hunting shotguns for export under the trademark "Baikal". The first model that began to sell for export was IZh-54 In 1973 plant began production of PSM pistol, in 1978 - IZh-35 pistols.

In 1982, the plant produced a small number of double barreled shotguns, such as the IZh-41. In 1980s plant began production of IZh-38 and IZh-40 air guns, since 1989 - IZh-46 air pistols.

After the dissolution of the Soviet Union the range of civilian products was greatly expanded, but firearms were still its major production. In 1993, Izhmekh began production of the IZh-76 gas pistol (the first model of gas pistol made in Russian Federation), IZh-81 and IZh-94 shotguns.

In 2002, Izhmekh began the production MP-461 pistols, and in 2004 the production of Makarych pistols.

In January 2004, a contract was signed between the Remington Arms company and the plant; Baikal firearms were bought by Remington and would be sold in USA with different names (IZh-18MN were sold as Remington SPR 18, IZh-94 were sold as the Remington SPR94, IZh-18 were sold as the Remington Spartan 100, IZh-43-1S were sold as the Remington Spartan 210, IZh-43 were sold as the Remington Spartan 220, IZh-27 were sold as the Remington Spartan 310 and MP-153 were sold as the Remington Spartan 453).

In 2008, Izhmekh made 9mm pistols, such as the MP-443 Grach and the MP-446 Viking, as well as gas pistols, signal pistols, rifles and several models of smoothbore hunting shotguns.

In 2010, Izhmekh began production of MP-353 pistols.

On August 13, 2013, Izhmash and Izhevsk Mechanical Plant were merged and formally renamed Kalashnikov Concern.

== Literature ==
- Н. А. Мокшин. Во имя Победы. 2-е изд. Ижевск, 1975.
