= Double-barreled shotgun =

Shotgun with two parallel barrels

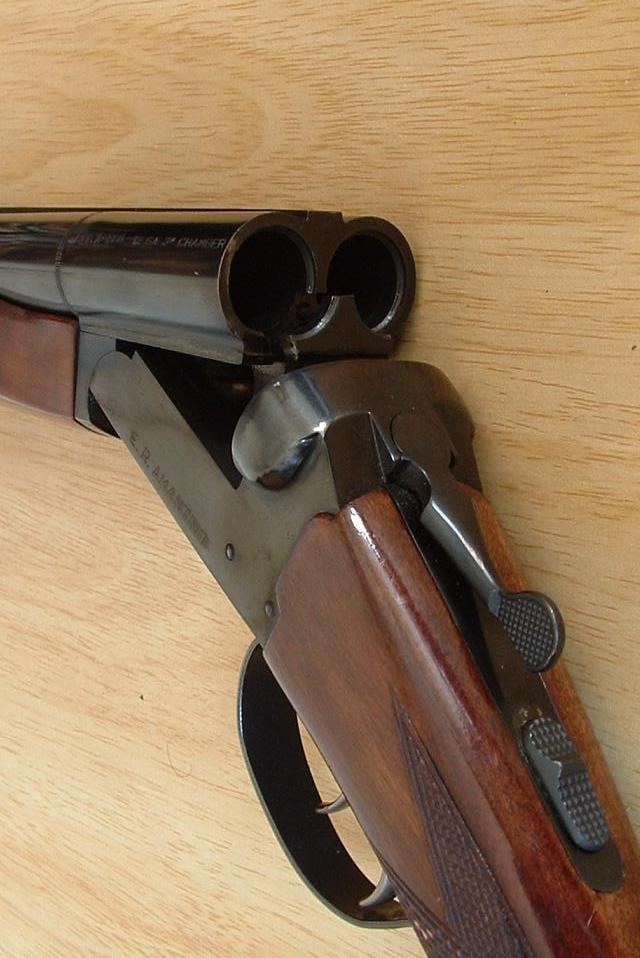
A view of the break-action of a typical side-by-side (SxS) double-barreled shotgun, with the Anson & Deeley boxlock action open and the extractor visible. The opening lever and the safety catch can also be clearly seen.

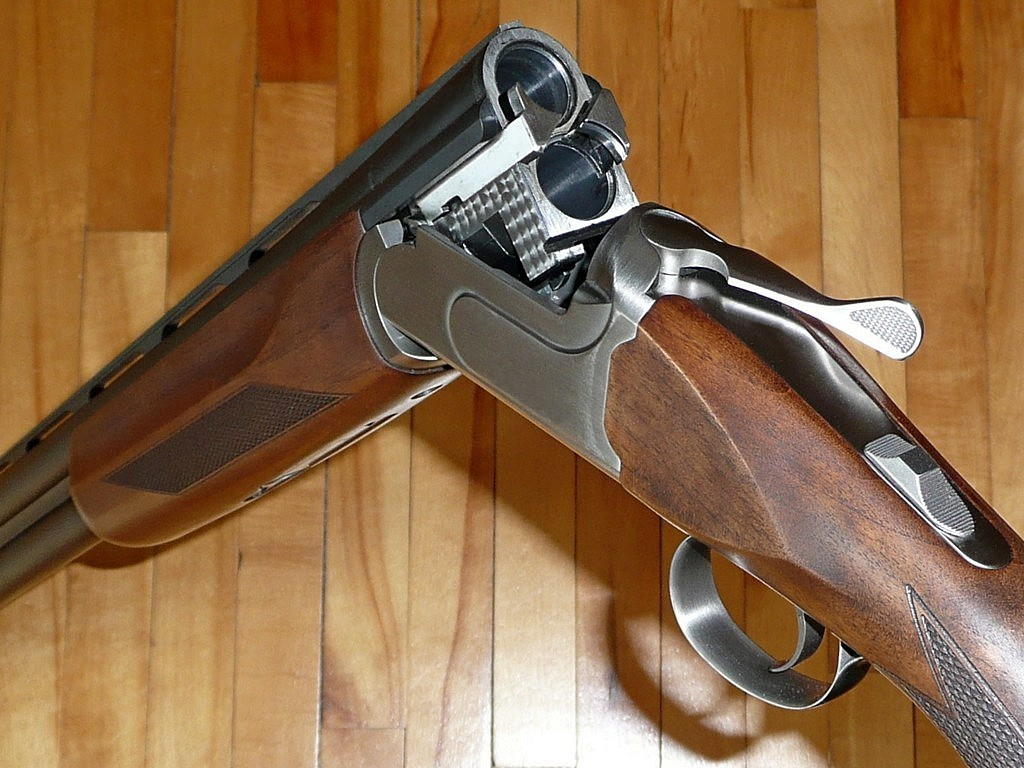
A view of the break-action of a typical over-and-under (O/U) double-barreled shotgun, with action open and the ejectors visible

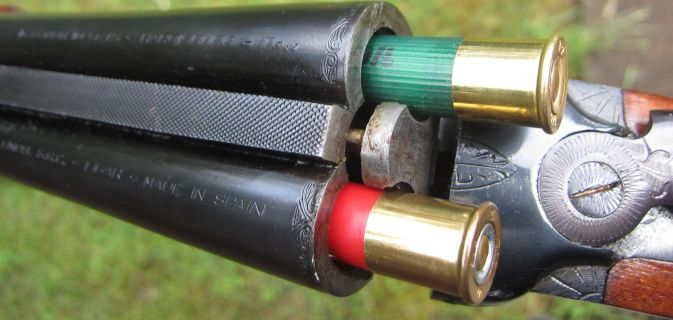
Two .410 shells being loaded into a side-by-side, double-barreled shotgun

A double-barreled shotgun, also known as a double shotgun, is a break-action shotgun with two parallel barrels, allowing two single shots that can be fired simultaneously or sequentially in quick succession.

== Construction ==
Modern double-barreled shotguns, often known simply as doubles, are almost universally break action, with the barrels hinging downward to expose the breeches for loading and unloading. Since there is no reciprocating action needed to eject and reload the shells, doubles are more compact than repeating designs such as pump action, lever action, bolt action, or self-loading shotguns.

=== Barrel configuration ===
Double-barreled shotguns (specifically break-action), come in two basic configurations:

- side-by-side (S×S) — the two barrels are arranged horizontally;
- over-and-under (O/U) — the two barrels are arranged vertically.

The original double-barreled guns were commonly all side-by-side designs, which was a more practical design for muzzleloaders. Early cartridge-firing shotguns also used the side-by-side action, because they kept the exposed hammers of the earlier muzzleloading shotguns from which they evolved. When hammerless designs started to become common, the over-and-under design was introduced, and most modern sporting doubles are over-and-under designs.

One significant advantage that doubles have over single-barrel repeating shotguns is the ability to have more than one choke at a time. Some shotgun shooting sports, such as skeet shooting, use crossing targets presented in a narrow range of distance, and only require one level of choke. Other sports, like sporting clays, give the shooter targets at differing ranges, and targets that might approach or recede from the shooter, and so must be engaged at differing ranges. Having two barrels lets the shooter use a more open choke for near targets, and a tighter choke for distant targets, providing the optimal shot pattern for each distance.

The disadvantage lies in the fact that the barrels of a double-barreled shotgun, whether over-and-under or side-by-side, are not parallel, but slightly angled, so that shots from the barrels converge, usually at "40 yards out". For the side-by-side configuration, the shotstring continues on its path to the opposite side of the rib after the converging point; for example, the left barrel's discharge travels on the left of the rib till it hits dead center at 40 yards (36.58 m) out, after that, the discharge continues on to the right. In the over-and-under configuration with a parallel rib, both barrels' discharges will keep to the dead center, but the discharge from the "under" barrel will shoot higher than the discharge from the "over" barrel after 40 yards (36.58 m). Thus, double-barreled shotguns are accurate only at practical shotgun ranges, though the range of their ammunition easily exceeds four to six times that distance.

Side-by-side shotguns are often more expensive and may take more practice to aim effectively than an over-and-under. The off-center nature of the recoil in a side-by-side gun may make shooting the body-side barrel slightly more painful by comparison to an over-and-under, single-shot, pump-action, or lever-action shotgun. Gas-operated and recoil-operated designs will recoil less than either. More side-by-side than over-and-under guns have traditional "cast-off" stocks, where the end of the buttstock veers slightly to the right, allowing a right-handed user to point the gun more easily.

Double-barreled shotguns are also inherently more safe, as whether the shotgun is loaded or can be fired can be ascertained by anyone present if the action is broken open, for instance on a skeet, trap or hunting clays course when another shooter is firing; if the action is open, the gun cannot fire. Similarly, doubles are more easily examined to see if loaded than pump-action or semi-automatic shotguns, whose bolt must be opened and chamber closely examined or felt to make sure it is unloaded; with a double gun (or a break-action single gun), whether the gun is loaded, i.e., has cartridges in any chamber, is easily and immediately seen with a glance (and just as easily unloaded).

=== Trigger mechanism ===
The early doubles used two triggers, one for each barrel, located front to back inside the trigger guard. The index finger was used to pull either trigger, as having two fingers inside the trigger guard can cause a very undesirable recoil-induced double-discharge. Double-trigger designs are typically set up for right-handed users. In double-trigger designs, it is often possible to pull both triggers at once, firing both barrels simultaneously, though this is generally not recommended as it doubles the recoil, battering both shotgun and shooter, particularly if it was unanticipated or unintended. Discharging both barrels at the same time has long been a hunting trick employed by hunters using 8 gauge "elephant" shotguns, firing the two 875 gr (56.7 g) slugs for sheer stopping power at close range.

Later models use a single trigger that alternately fires both barrels, called a single selective trigger or SST. The single selective trigger does not allow firing both barrels at once, since the single trigger must be pulled twice in order to fire both barrels. The change from one barrel to the other may be done by a clockwork type system, where a cam alternates between barrels, or by an inertial system where the recoil of firing the first barrel toggles the trigger to the next barrel. A double-barreled shotgun with an inertial trigger works best with full power shotshells; shooting low recoil shotshells often will not reliably toggle the inertial trigger, causing an apparent failure to fire occasionally when attempting to depress the trigger a second time to fire the second barrel (this also can happen if the first shell fails to fire). Generally there is a method of selecting the order in which the barrels of a single selective trigger shotgun fire; commonly this is done through manipulation of the safety, pushing to one side to select top barrel first and the other side to select bottom barrel first. In the event that an inertial trigger does not toggle to the second barrel when firing low recoil shotshells, manually selecting the order to the second barrel will enable the second barrel to fire when the trigger is depressed again.

One of the advantages of double-barreled shotgun with double triggers or single selective trigger, is that the second shot can be taken almost immediately after the first with merely a second trigger pull, without needing to manually operate the action (which will inevitably destabilize the gun from the shoulder position and affect aim), and can utilize different chokes for the two shots (assuming, of course, that full power shotshells are fired, at least for a double-barreled shotgun with an inertial type single selective trigger, as needed to toggle the inertial trigger). This can be noticeably faster than a pump-action shotgun, which requires manually pumping the fore-end to eject and reload for the second shot, and may be faster, or not slower, than a semi-automatic shotgun (as there are no bolt movements to delay the rechambering of a second shell). Note, however, in neither the pump-action or semi-automatic will the second shot be a different choke pattern from the first shot, whereas for a double, the two shots are usually with different chokes. Thus, depending on the nature of the hunt, the appropriate choke for the shot is always at hand. For example, while field hunting flushing birds, the first shot is usually closer than the second because the bird flies away from the shooter; so, the more open choke (and barrel) would be better for the first shot, and if a second shot is needed, as the bird is flying away, the more closed (and thus longer distance of an effective shot pattern) choke (and barrel) is then appropriate. Conversely, on a driven hunt, where the birds are driven towards the shooter, the closed (longer effective distance) choke (and barrel) should be fired first, saving the open (closer effective distance) choke (and barrel) for the now-closer incoming bird. None of this is possible with single-barrel shotguns, only with a double, either a side-by-side (S×S) or over-and-under (O/U).

=== Regulation ===
Regulation is a term used for multi-barreled firearms (most commonly found in rifles and shotguns) that indicates how close to the same point of aim the barrels will shoot. A poorly regulated gun may hit consistently with one barrel but miss consistently with the other, making the gun nearly useless for anything requiring two shots. Regulation is necessary due to barrel yaw; absolutely zero yaw, in which both barrels fire perfectly straight and their lines of fire are perfectly parallel, will never happen in practice, and the barrels both shooting wide (the lines of their aim intersecting behind the muzzle) is not useful, so the gun is regulated to have the lines of fire converge at some point in front of the muzzle at a given distance, usually the maximum expected range since that is the range at which a full choke is used and where precise regulation matters most. However, the short ranges and spread of shot provide a significant overlap, so a small error in regulation in a double is often too small to be noticed. Regulation is usually more important in side-by-side rather than over-under shotguns, as felt recoil differs.

== See also ==
- Boxlock action – Firing mechanism with the lockwork mounted internally
- Coach gun
- Combination guns – Type of firearm with at least one rifled barrel and one smoothbore barrel
- Double-barreled cannon – American Civil War cannon
- Double rifle – Sporting rifle with two parallel barrels
- Lupara – Italian word for a type of shotgun
- Multiple-barrel firearm – Type of firearm with more than one barrel
- Standard Manufacturing DP-12
