= Demethylzeylasteral =

Names
- Preferred IUPAC name (2R,4aS,6aR,6aS,14aS,14bR)-9-formyl-10,11-dihydroxy-2,4a,6a,6a,14a-pentamethyl-8-oxo-1,3,4,5,6,13,14,14b-octahydropicene-2-carboxylic acid

Identifiers
CAS Number	107316-88-1
3D model (JSmol)	Interactive image
ChEBI	CHEBI:132314
ChEMBL	ChEMBL3949551
ChemSpider	8498375
PubChem CID	10322911
CompTox Dashboard (EPA)	DTXSID901315726
- InChI: InChI=1S/C29H36O6/c1-25-6-7-26(2,24(34)35)14-21(25)29(5)11-9-27(3)17-12-19(32)23(33)16(15-30)22(17)18(31)13-20(27)28(29,4)10-8-25/h12-13,15,21,32-33H,6-11,14H2,1-5H3,(H,34,35)/t21-,25-,26-,27+,28-,29+/m1/s1 Key: ZDZSFWLPCFRASW-CPISFEQASA-N
- SMILES: C[C@]12CC[C@@](C[C@H]1[C@@]3(CC[C@]4(C5=CC(=C(C(=C5C(=O)C=C4[C@]3(CC2)C)C=O)O)O)C)C)(C)C(=O)O

Properties
Chemical formula	C_{29}H_{36}O_{6}
Molar mass	480.601 g·mol^{−1}
- Except where otherwise noted, data are given for materials in their standard state (at 25 °C [77 °F], 100 kPa). Infobox references

Demethylzeylasteral is a naturally occurring organic compound with the formula C_{29}H_{36}O_{6}. It is a pentacyclic triterpenoid compound isolated from the roots of Tripterygium wilfordii, a species of vine native to East and Southeast Asia commonly referred to as thunder god vine.

== Isolation ==
Tripterygium wilfordii, also called as thunder god vine, is a perennial vine native to East and Southeast Asia, particularly in China, Korea, and Japan. Demethylzeylasteral is typically isolated from the root xylem or the skin of the vine's root. It was reportedly first isolated in the 1990s by researchers at the Pharmaceutical Science Research Laboratory of Zhongshan Hospital, Fudan University in Shanghai.

== Structure and properties ==
Demethylzeylasteral is classified as a pentacyclic triterpenoid with the molecular formula C_{29}H_{36}O_{6} and a molecular weight of 480.601 g/mol. The compound appears as a yellow amorphous powder. The pharmacologically active constituents of T. wilfordii include a diverse range of terpenoids, alkaloids, lignans, and diterpenes. Among these, triptolide and celastrol have been extensively studied for their potent biological activities.

== Applications ==
The therapeutic profile of T. wilfordii encompasses a broad range of indications, particularly within the framework of traditional medicine. It has long been employed to manage autoimmune and inflammatory disorders, with notable effectiveness in treating rheumatoid arthritis. Other autoimmune conditions traditionally treated with this plant include systemic lupus erythematosus (SLE), autoimmune hepatitis, and ankylosing spondylitis.

Renal diseases such as chronic nephritis, nephrotic syndrome, idiopathic IgA nephropathy, and diabetic nephropathy have also been addressed using preparations derived from T. wilfordii. Additionally, the plant is utilized in the management of dermatological conditions, including psoriasis and vitiligo.

Within the theoretical framework of traditional Chinese medicine (TCM), T. wilfordii is said to promote blood circulation, unblock meridians, expel wind and dampness, and alleviate pain and swelling. It has also been used to treat fever, edema, and carbuncles.
