= Dart gun =

Non-lethal gun used to deliver sedatives and medications to animals

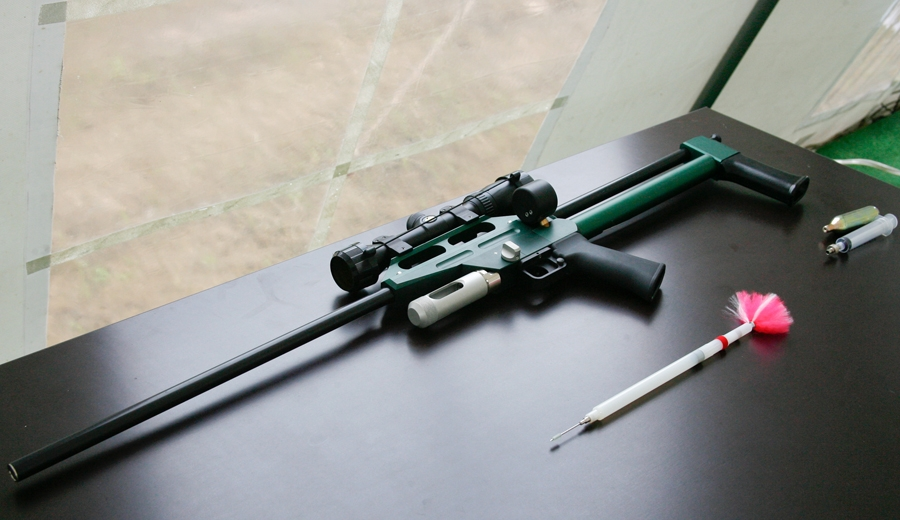
A Dan Inject Model JM air rifle with a tranquillizer dart

A dart gun is an air rifle that fires a dart. The dart is tipped with a hypodermic needle and filled with an anesthetic, vaccine, antibiotic or contraceptive. A dart gun containing an anesthetic is called a tranquillizer gun (also spelled tranquilizer gun, tranquilliser gun or tranquiliser gun).

== History ==
The modern dart gun was invented in the 1950s by New Zealander Colin Murdoch. During his involvement in a research project on Himalayan tahr in the Southern Alps, he considered that administering a dose of anesthetic from afar was safer for humans and more humane for animals than current methods of capture. To that end, Murdoch went on to develop a range of rifles, darts, and pistols.

The first modern remote drug-delivery system was invented by scientists at the University of Georgia in the 1950s, and was the direct predecessor to the Cap-Chur equipment used worldwide for decades. In 1953, a study on antler growth was conducted in which seven free-ranging bucks were tranquilized — three died from overdose, three were successfully anesthetized, and one was minimally sedated.

In the late 1950s, a team in Kenya headed by Toni Harthoorn discovered that various species, despite being of roughly equal size (for example, the rhinoceros and the buffalo), needed very different doses and spectra of drugs to safely anesthetize them. They also found that much like humans, rhinos given a dose insufficient to anesthetize them were still sedated enough to be manageable if the procedure wasn't invasive.

In June, 1961, a 220-pound man was confined in the maximum security cell of the Clarke County Jail in Athens, Georgia, while awaiting transfer to the state mental hospital because of paranoid behavior. He became violently agitated, ripped the bars from the windows, and began to break through the masonry walls of his cell. When several efforts to subdue him failed, Sheriff H. T. Huff and Dr. C. D. Warren (then county physician) requested the University of Georgia School of Veterinary Medicine to send a tranquilizer gun to the jail. Dr. T. R. Ridgeway'O complied with this request and, with the assistance of Dr. Warren (who sterilized the equipment and prepared the drug), used the tranquilizer gun to deliver 7 1/2 grains of sodium amytal to the prisoner. The dart, fired from a distance of about ten feet, hit the left mid-flank of the prisoner. The prisoner lunged through a hole in the wall and sustained a scalp injury during his scuffle with the police officers. Almost six minutes after being darted, the prisoner lost consciousness and was handcuffed. They considered this a success since they had managed to subdue the prisoner without shooting him or otherwise harming him. This was the weapon's first known usage on a human being.

In the early 1960s, the New York City Police Department considered adopting the tranquilizer gun. Deputy Commissioner Walter Arm suggested that it might replace tear gas if adopted but stressed that it would not be used for crowd control. In April 1962, the Planning Bureau arranged to pick up samples of weapons and anesthetics manufactured by the Palmer Chemical and Equipment Company of Douglasville, Georgia. Samples of the anesthetics were turned over to the medical department for study, and the darts were tested on silhouette targets in pistol ranges. Tests in pistol ranges showed an accuracy rate of 90 percent at a range up to 45 yards. "The dart gun is still under study and in the experimental and research stages," Arm pointed out. "No recommendation has been made for its use." The department eventually rejected the weapon, both for not being as fast-acting as tear gas and for its potential to kill.

Since 1967, hollow bullets with sedatives for anesthesia of wild animals began to be used in the USSR. In the first half of the 1970s, experimental 9×53mmR cartridges for anesthesia of wild animals for 9mm "Los" bolt-action carbine and "flying dart" for 16 gauge shotguns were made and tested. In the mid-1970s, "flying dart" for 12 gauge shotguns and experimental cartridges for anesthesia of wild animals for the SPSh-44 pistol were made and tested. In the second half of the 1980s, the standard tranquillizer gun in the USSR was a single-shot IZh-18M shotgun (a dart with a dose of sedative was fired with a blank cartridge).

In 1968, after several failed prisoner-snatch missions in Vietnam, Chief SOG Colonel Jack Singlaub insisted on using tranquilizer darts. In the following prisoner-snatch mission, several SOG teams used tranquilizer guns with varying doses. NVA men who had been darted with lower doses retaliated and had to be shot, and NVA men who had been darted with higher doses died from overdose. None were successfully captured.

In 1979, Murdoch received a call from a police marksman on the Armed Offenders Squad about a man who had taken his wife hostage, recognizing that the offender could not be reasoned with and that a standard firearm would risk the hostage's life. Murdoch gave the officer instructions on what dose to use, where to dart the offender, and at what setting to have the weapon's velocity. The hostage taker lost consciousness within minutes, and the hostage was rescued. This is the last known case of a tranquilizer dart being legally authorized for use on a human.

While initially designed for delivering anesthetics, veterinarians and farmers recognized that the remote drug-delivery system could be used to deliver medications. In 1993, the first wildlife contraceptive was invented, and darts have since been used to deliver contraceptives to does — a humane alternative to hunting. Starting in Kansas in the late 90s, it has become commonplace for farmers to use darts to deliver antibiotics to sick cattle. While farmers had been administering medications to cattle before the invention of the dart gun, it had been impossible to do so without capturing the animal.

== Characteristics ==
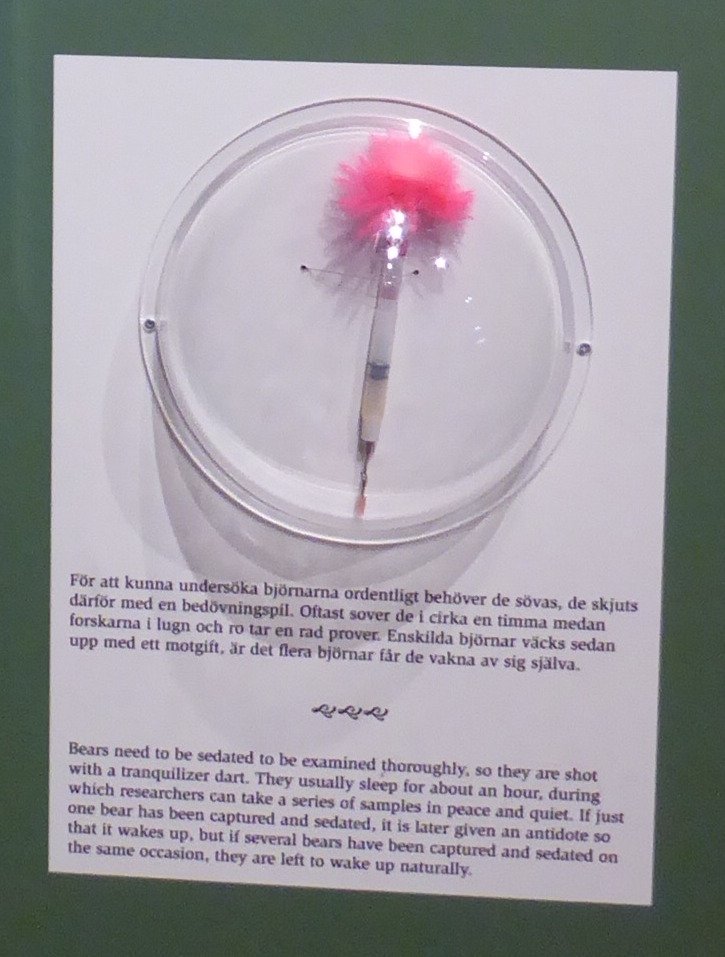
A bear dart

The dart, which varies in size depending on weight and species, is a ballistic syringe loaded with a solution and tipped with a hypodermic needle. The dart is propelled from the gun by compressed gas, and it is stabilized in flight by a tailpiece consisting of a tuft of fibrous material. The needle may be plain or collared, with a barb-like ring to improve retention of the needle and syringe to assure that the full dose is administered. Darts are designed to be fired full, so if the dart is too big for the dose, it must be topped up with water.

Methods of driving injection upon impact include: gas compression, spring compression, explosive charge, or gas evolution reaction. In one example, compressed air or butane in the rear of the dart pressurizes the solution, while the needle is capped to hold the fluid in place. Upon striking the target, the cap is pierced by the needle as it punctures the animal's skin. With the pressure released, the compressed gas pushes the solution out of the syringe and into the target.

== Lethality ==
As with all forms of sedation, tranquilizer darts are never risk-free. Unlike other forms of sedation, it is not possible to perform a pre-anesthetic evaluation beforehand, as this requires a level of cooperation that would make darting unnecessary. Supportive care for unconscious animals, such as artificial ventilation, intravenous therapy, or inotropic support, is often not possible in field situations. In addition to the risks of the anesthetic itself such as respiratory failure from overdose, fatal allergic reactions such as anaphylaxis, and aspiration pneumonia or asphyxiation from vomiting while unconscious, there are other circumstances that pose secondary risks of serious injury or death, such as subjects running into a body of water and drowning, falling victim to predators, climbing to potentially fatal heights before falling, or overheating while anesthetized. One of the most controversial animal deaths caused by tranquilization was in February 2009 when a 10-pound dog that had gotten loose was tranquilized by animal control and subsequently died from overdose. "The dog was jumping around a man who was in the area holding his child, wanting to play. That's why it's so unbelievable they shot it with dart," a witness recounted.

In 1987, as the New York City Police Department continued its search "for a device that is stronger than a nightstick and less dangerous than a gun", they rejected tranquilizer darts as "too dangerous".

Darts can be dangerous regardless of what they are being used to deliver, as they can cause fatal injury due to improper velocity setting or shot placement, or infection due to failure to sterilize darts that have been used before.

== Agents ==
=== Tranquilizers ===
Several tranquilizing drugs have been devised for use in tranquillizer darts. If an animal is calm or in a position where it cannot attack, a slow-acting anesthetic will be used. These include:

- Azaperone
- Detomidine
- Midazolam
- Fentanyl and carfentanil
- Haloperidol
- Etorphine
- Diazepam
- Xylazine
- Sodium thiopental

If an animal is out of control, a fast-acting anesthetic will be used. These take between 2 and 8 minutes to take effect and include:

- Etorphine hydrochloride
- Ketamine

=== Antibiotics ===
Antibiotics used in antibiotic darts vary by taxonomy.

Artiodactyla

- Enrofloxacin
- Oxytetracycline
- Trimethoprim
- Amoxicillin
- Augmentin
- Clindamycin
- Enrofloxacin
- Tulathromycin (Draxxin)
- Tildopyrosin

Primates

- Azithromycin
- Enrofloxacin

=== Vaccines ===
Most vaccines used in vaccination darts vary by taxonomy.

Primates

- MMR vaccine

Felines

- FPV or FPLV vaccine
- FHV vaccine
- FCV vaccine
- Rabies vaccine

Bovines

- Brucellosis vaccine (RB51)
- Blackleg vaccine
- Leptospira

Mammals

- PZP (contraceptive vaccine)

=== Contraceptives ===
Contraceptives used in contraception darts are the same across various species.

- PZP (contraceptive vaccine)
- Medroxyprogesterone acetate

== Use on animals ==
Dart guns allow farmers to administer antibiotics to sick cattle from a safe distance.

=== Domestic animals ===
Animal control agencies may use dart guns to deliver anesthetics to stray, feral, or injured dogs when other methods of capture, such as catch poles and snares, have failed. This method of capture is usually avoided for feral cats and small dogs because of how difficult it is to get the right dose for small animals without a pre-anesthetic evaluation. Veterinarians in third-world countries may use dart guns to deliver vaccines to free-ranging dogs to prevent them from contracting rabies, although these are more commonly delivered by blowpipe darts. Feral horses (often incorrectly referred to as wild horses) are shot with darts containing contraceptives. Farmers may use dart guns to deliver antibiotics and vaccines to cattle. Animal control agencies may use dart guns to deliver anesthetics to escaped cattle, sheep, or pigs.

=== Wildlife ===
Animal control agencies may use dart guns to deliver anesthetics to dangerous wildlife that has wandered into human territory. Wildlife conservationists may use dart guns to deliver anesthetics to animals that are injured, entangled, requiring surgery, or at risk of being killed by poachers. Wildlife conservationists may used dart guns to deliver vaccines or antibiotics, although these are more commonly delivered by blowpipe darts. In parts of the United States, does are shot with darts containing a wildlife contraceptive, rendering them temporarily infertile.

=== Exotic animals ===
Dart guns may be used by zoo emergency response teams to deliver anesthetics to escaped animals and, in some cases, to animals with a human intruder in their enclosure after the animal has been successfully shooed away from the intruder. Zookeepers may use dart guns to deliver vaccines or antibiotics, although these are more commonly delivered by blowpipe darts or pole syringes.

=== Cetaceans ===
National Marine Mammal Entanglement Response Networks may use dart guns to deliver anesthetics to entangled cetaceans.

== Use on humans ==
=== Police use ===
Tranquilizer darts are not generally included in police less-than-lethal arsenals because a target will start to feel the effect before losing consciousness (since a carefully calculated dosage takes at least a minute to take full effect) and a target that is aware that it is going to lose consciousness can retaliate, a suspect could have a concealed weapon, the dart gun's short range (up to 30 yards) coupled with the anesthetic's slow immobilization speed means an officer would have to get within 30 yards of a suspect who will not be immediately immobilized (a situation that can be mitigated with non-human targets by using safety barriers such as safari trucks), a target can have a deadly allergic reaction to the anesthetic, and because effective use requires an estimate of the target's weight—too little anesthetic will have no effect, and too much anesthetic will result in death, which can lead to a lawsuit or being convicted of manslaughter or second-degree murder if the target is a human. "If you shot somebody that was small, it could kill them. If you shot somebody who was big or had drugs in their system, it might not do anything." says Newett, of the Justice Department.

In 1979, in Auckland, New Zealand, a man took his wife hostage, and the Armed Offenders Squad were called out. Talking to Colin Murdoch, the inventor of the tranquilizer gun, via telephone, a police marksman was instructed what dose to use, where to dart the offender, and at what setting to have the weapon's velocity. The hostage taker lost consciousness within minutes, and the hostage was rescued.

=== Prison use ===
The only known case of a tranquilizer dart being used on a prisoner was in 1961 in Athens, Georgia. A 220-pound man began to break through the masonry walls of his cell, and a request was made to University of Georgia School of Veterinary Medicine to send a tranquilizer gun to the jail. A veterinarian arrived with a dart gun, and after the county physician prepared a dose and sterilized the equipment, fired 7 1/2 grains of sodium amytal into the prisoner. Six minutes later, the prisoner lost consciousness. The common method of subduing an inmate for cell extraction is to instead fill their cell with pepper spray.

=== Military use ===
Although tranquilizer darts are banned for use in war, there is only one known case of them being used by the military. After several failed prisoner-snatch missions in Vietnam, Chief SOG Colonel Jack Singlaub insisted on using tranquilizer darts. Pentagon officers voiced objections to this. At a conference in 1968, Singlaub raised the issue again. "They asked about NVA reaction to SOG helicopter insertion of recon teams, and they wanted my opinion on the ability of SIG teams to capture valuable NVA officers on the Trail. I pointed out the Pentagon's refusal to authorize tranquilizer darts for this very purpose. [Army Chief of Staff Westmoreland] made it clear the matter would be reconsidered," Singlaub recounts. In the following prisoner-snatch mission, several SOG teams used tranquilizer guns with varying doses. NVA men who had been darted with lower doses retaliated and had to be shot, and NVA men who had been darted with higher doses died from overdose. None were successfully captured.

=== Criminal use ===
Tranquilizer darts are generally not used in kidnappings, rape, or theft because they would easily be detected in a public place such as a bar or restaurant. As "drugged beverages are so much easier to conceal," explains Dr. Theodore Davantzis. The only person who has been suspected to have used one criminally is Barry Morphew, who is suspected to have chased his wife around the house after shooting her with a tranquilizer dart. In the family dryer, investigators found a dart cap along with the pair of shorts Morphew was last seen wearing. An autopsy later confirmed the presence of anesthetic drugs in her body, although it remains unclear whether the drugs were the cause of her death. The anesthetic found in Suzanne's body was BAM, the same one that Barry, who owned a deer farm, had used to sedate bucks in order to remove and sell their antlers and to sedate deer to transport them to game reserves for canned hunting.

=== Unauthorized use ===
Police and military forces in China are suspected of using tranquilizer pistols. The most publicized incident was on June 11, 2013, when eight children and one adult were hospitalized, allegedly after police fired tranquilizer darts at them during an unauthorized mass eviction targeting Hui Muslim residents.

=== Entertainment industry ===
Movies and television producers typically avoid darting actors. For scenes where an actor appears to be darted, an actor either swiftly slaps a prop dart with a flat, sticky adhesive end onto their own skin mid-action, or the scene is staged using a spring-loaded mechanical rig hidden on the actor's body that pops the dart out instantly when triggered. For modern high-budget films, the dart flying through the air and impacting the target is entirely digital CGI. The only known case of an actor being darted in real life was in the episode of WWE Smackdown that aired on September 23, 2004, when Kurt Angle darted Paul Wight. "He shot me with a real dart, there was nothing in it, but I wanted the visual of the dart sticking my back because I thought, 'That'd be great,' and I could do the roar and the sell and fall down and I'm helpless," Wight recounts. "How do you tell that story? I was all wrapped up in the mechanics of it and finally talked Vince [Vince McMahon] into doing it. Vince was kind of crazy back then. He thought I was just trying to be tough. When I started to explain it to him more, he really got into it. If I wanted to get out of it, we weren’t getting out of it. I was into it, except for that part where my friend Kurt Angle has OCD and instead of pumping the gun once, he pumped it six times. When he shot me in the back with that thing, from five feet away because we wanted to make sure there was no missing and no accident. When he hit me, you'll see me look over my shoulder at Kurt because, in my mind, I'm like, 'Oww!' It was intense. I've never been shot before, and I'm sure being really shot hurts much worse, but that's all I need to know of ever getting shot."

== Legality ==
Tranquilizer darts are banned for use in war by Article I.5 of the Chemical Weapons Convention, which bans the use of all chemical agents in warfare. Tranquilizer darts are classified as deadly weapons. The only time when tranquilizer darts are not classified as deadly force is in situations where the subject's weight, physical condition, allergies, and what drugs are currently in their system are all known factors (such as zoos and prisons).

=== Canada ===
Dart guns are prohibited weapons under Control of Weapons Regulations 2021. Self-protection or self-defense is not a lawful excuse to possess such weapons.

=== United Kingdom ===
Dart guns are prohibited weapons under the Firearms Act 1968 and cannot be used to deliver anesthetics, antibiotics, or vaccines to a human being without a firearms license and permission from the Secretaries of State.
