= SenesTech =

American biotechnology company

SenesTech, Inc.
- Company type: Public
- Traded as: Nasdaq: SNES; Russell Microcap Index component
- Industry: Biotechnology; Pest control
- Founded: 2004; 21 years ago
- Founder: Dr. Loretta Mayer; Dr. Cheryl Dyer
- Headquarters: Phoenix, Arizona, United States
- Area served: United States and international markets
- Key people: Joel Fruendt (CEO); Tom Chesterman (CFO); Warren Hopkins (Sales Director)
- Products: ContraPest; Evolve
- Brands: contrapeststore.com
- Services: Fertility control
- Number of employees: 33
- Website: senestech.com

SenesTech, Inc. (/sɛnɛstɛk/) is an agricultural biotechnology life-sciences company, specializing in fertility management as a form of pest control. The company's primary product, ContraPest is designed to make brown and black rats infertile. SenesTech is headquartered in Phoenix, Arizona.

== History ==
The company was founded by Dr. Loretta Mayer and several colleagues, who were researching menopause in rodents. The commercial applications of their research became apparent, and they incorporated SenesTech in 2004. In 2019, SenesTech began selling directly to the public.

== Products ==
=== ContraPest ===
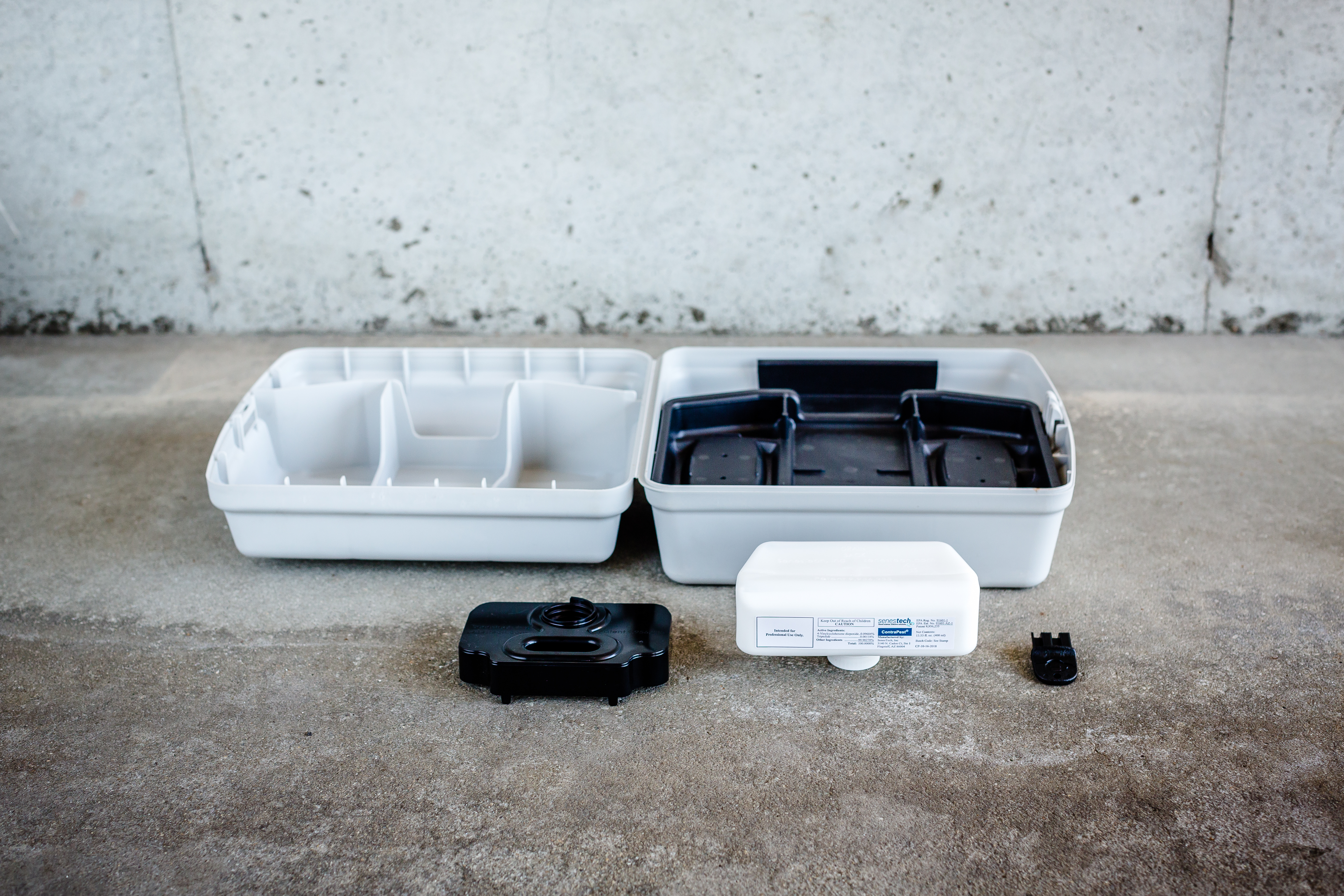
ContraPest Replacement Kit and Bait Station

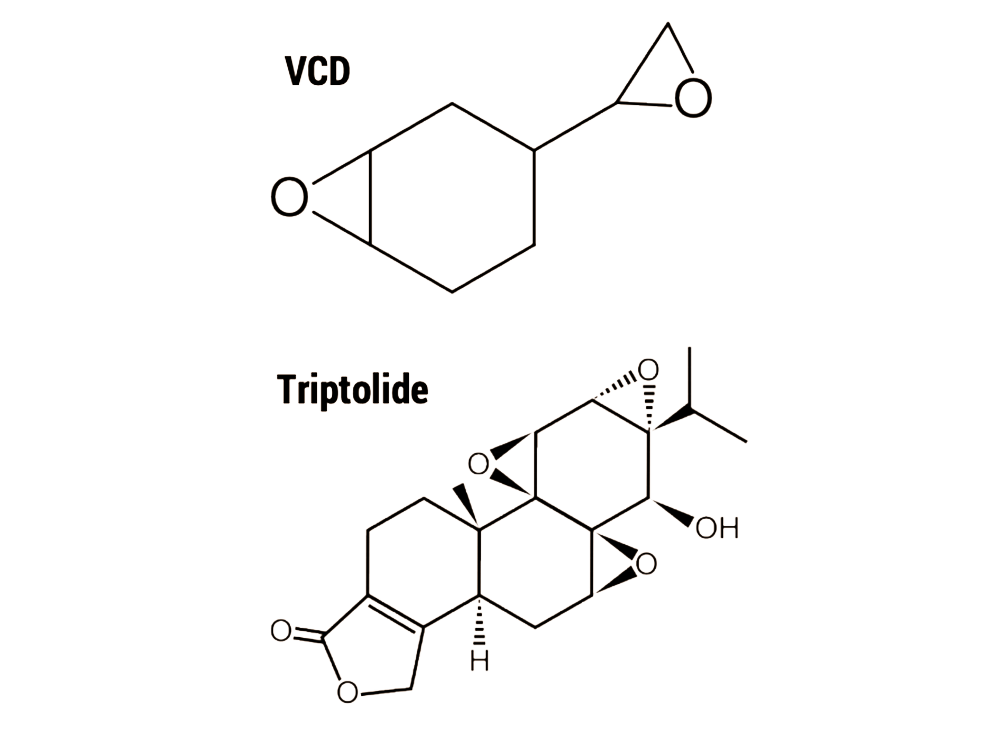
Chemical structure of VCD and Triptolide, the active ingredients in ContraPest

ContraPest is a sugary liquid, designed to be attractive to, and to be consumed by rats in order to eliminate future potential offspring. However, it does not sterilize the rats, so a continuous supply is required.

The product was approved for commercial use by the U.S. Environmental Protection Agency in August 2016. Removal of the "Restricted Use Only" label from ContraPest was permitted by the EPA in October 2018. The active ingredients of ContraPest are 4-vinylcyclohexene diepoxide (VCD), which reduces oocytes in immature ovarian follicles and triptolide reducing reproductive effects on both males and females.

== See also ==
- 4-vinylcyclohexene diepoxide
- Pest control
