= Triptofordin C-2 =

Identifiers
CAS Number	111514-63-7
3D model (JSmol)	Interactive image
ChEBI	CHEBI:132152
ChemSpider	115588
PubChem CID	130681
CompTox Dashboard (EPA)	DTXSID60912195
- InChI: InChI=1S/C33H38O11/c1-18(34)40-25-22(36)17-31(5,39)33-26(41-19(2)35)23(30(3,4)44-33)24(42-28(37)20-13-9-7-10-14-20)27(32(25,33)6)43-29(38)21-15-11-8-12-16-21/h7-16,22-27,36,39H,17H2,1-6H3/t22-,23-,24-,25-,26-,27-,31-,32-,33?/m1/s1 Key: FOIOSVGAFMLLDU-QGCFOTDLSA-N
- SMILES: CC(=O)O[C@@H]1[C@@H](C[C@@](C23[C@]1([C@@H]([C@@H]([C@H]([C@H]2OC(=O)C)C(O3)(C)C)OC(=O)C4=CC=CC=C4)OC(=O)C5=CC=CC=C5)C)(C)O)O

Properties
Chemical formula	C_{33}H_{38}O_{11}
Molar mass	610.656 g·mol^{−1}
- Except where otherwise noted, data are given for materials in their standard state (at 25 °C [77 °F], 100 kPa). Infobox references

Triptofordin C-2 is an antiviral chemical compound isolated from Tripterygium wilfordii.
