= Friedelin =

Names
- Systematic IUPAC name (4R,4aS,6aS,6bR,8aR,12aR,12bS,14aS,14bS)-4,4a,6b,8a,11,11,12b,14a-Octamethylicosahydropicen-3(2H)-one
- Other names Friedeline; Friedelan-3-one

Identifiers
CAS Number	559-74-0
3D model (JSmol)	Interactive image
ChEBI	CHEBI:5171
ChEMBL	ChEMBL485998
ChemSpider	82597
ECHA InfoCard	100.008.369
EC Number	209-205-1
KEGG	C08626
PubChem CID	91472
UNII	AK21264UAD
CompTox Dashboard (EPA)	DTXSID101015732
- InChI: InChI=1S/C30H50O/c1-20-21(31)9-10-22-27(20,5)12-11-23-28(22,6)16-18-30(8)24-19-25(2,3)13-14-26(24,4)15-17-29(23,30)7/h20,22-24H,9-19H2,1-8H3/t20-,22+,23-,24+,26+,27+,28-,29+,30-/m0/s1 Key: OFMXGFHWLZPCFL-SVRPQWSVSA-N
- SMILES: C[C@H]1C(=O)CC[C@@H]2[C@@]1(CC[C@H]3[C@]2(CC[C@@]4([C@@]3(CC[C@@]5([C@H]4CC(CC5)(C)C)C)C)C)C)C

Properties
Chemical formula	C_{30}H_{50}O
Molar mass	426.729 g·mol^{−1}
Appearance	white powder
Density	0.693 g/cm^{3}
Melting point	263 °C (505 °F; 536 K)
Boiling point	477.18 °C (890.92 °F; 750.33 K)

Hazards
Flash point	233.9 °C
- Except where otherwise noted, data are given for materials in their standard state (at 25 °C [77 °F], 100 kPa). Infobox references

Friedelin is a triterpenoid chemical compound found in Azima tetracantha, Orostachys japonica, and Quercus stenophylla. Friedelin is also found in the roots of the Cannabis plant. It is noted as having antimicrobial properties and has been recovered from the byproducts of corkboard manufacturing. The compound is also a biological precursor of celastrol. It is considered a friedelane-type compound, appearing structurally similar with the addition of a ketone group.
