= Friedelane =

Chemical compound

- Skeletal formula of

Names
- Preferred IUPAC name (4S,4aR,6aS,6aS,6bR,8aR,12aR,14aS,14bR)-4,4a,6a,6b,8a,11,11,14a-octamethyl-1,2,3,4,5,6,6a,7,8,9,10,12,12a,13,14,14b-hexadecahydropicene

Identifiers
CAS Number	559-73-9
3D model (JSmol)	Interactive image
ChEBI	CHEBI:71575
ChemSpider	20056444
PubChem CID	15559345
CompTox Dashboard (EPA)	DTXSID001165671
- InChI: InChI=1S/C30H52/c1-21-10-9-11-22-27(21,5)13-12-23-28(22,6)17-19-30(8)24-20-25(2,3)14-15-26(24,4)16-18-29(23,30)7/h21-24H,9-20H2,1-8H3/t21-,22+,23-,24+,26+,27+,28-,29+,30-/m0/s1 Key: KVSNMTUIMXZPLU-XOZXFAFYSA-N
- SMILES: C[C@H]1CCC[C@@H]2[C@@]1(CC[C@H]3[C@]2(CC[C@@]4([C@@]3(CC[C@@]5([C@H]4CC(CC5)(C)C)C)C)C)C)C

Properties
Chemical formula	C_{30}H_{52}
Molar mass	412.746 g·mol^{−1}
- Except where otherwise noted, data are given for materials in their standard state (at 25 °C [77 °F], 100 kPa). Infobox references

Friedelane is an aliphatic chemical compound and natural product. Its formula is C_{30}H_{52}. Friedelane is a triterpene, and it and similar compounds are found in several plants. One such compound found in the bark of cork oak, friedelin, is considered a "friedelane-like", and has noted antimicrobial properties. It is also a biological precursor of celastrol.

== Occurrence ==
Friedelane is found in the wood of Calophyllum tomentosum, as well as the flowers of Pongamia pinnata.
