= VCH =

VCH may refer to:

- Vancouver Coastal Health
- Vertical clitoral hood piercing
- Victoria County History (Victoria History of the Counties of England)
- Victoria Concert Hall
- Verlag Chemie (now Wiley-VCH), a publishing company
- 4-Vinylcyclohexene
