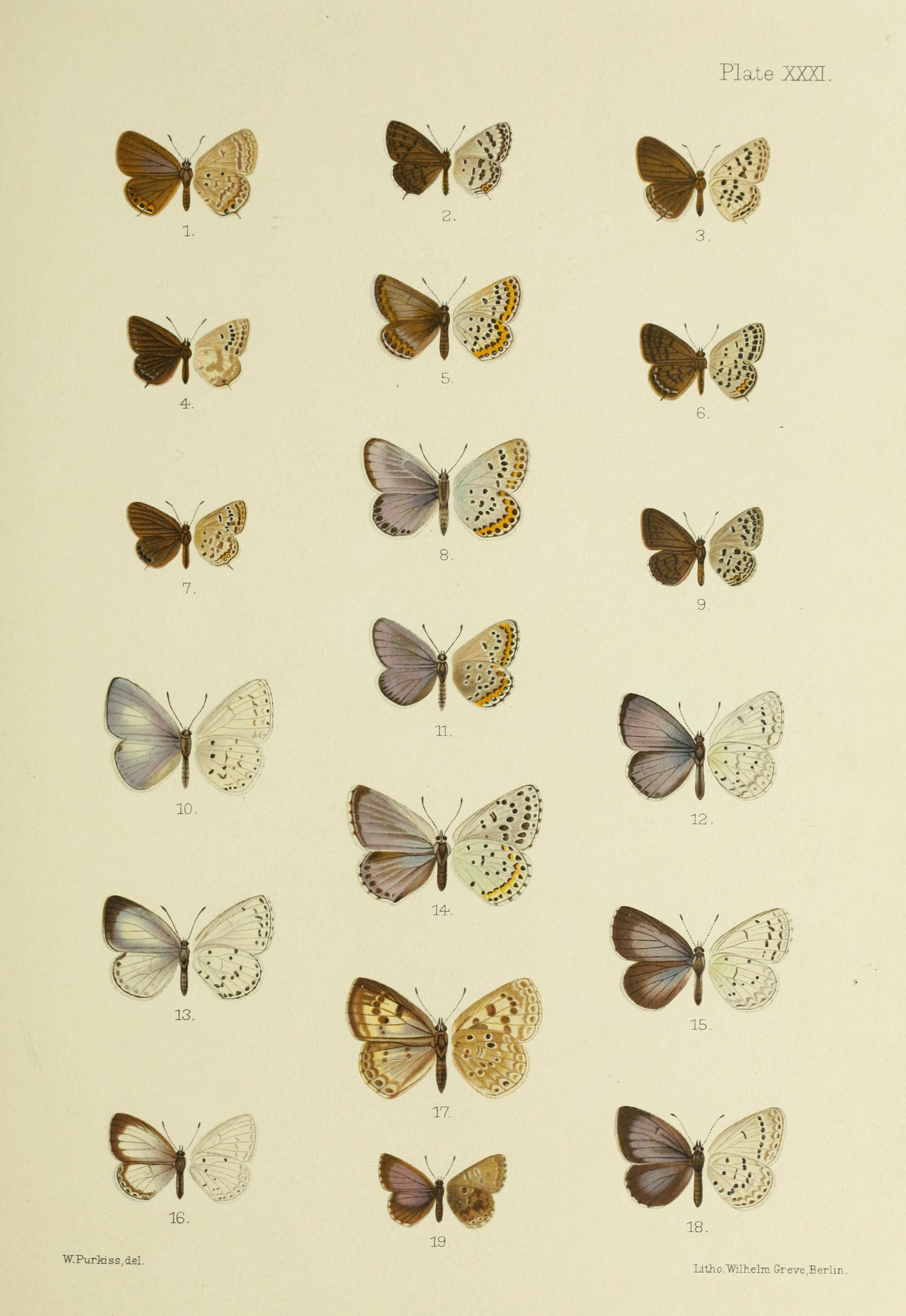
- Butterfly 4 is a Tongeia ion male from China

Scientific classification
- Domain: Eukaryota
- Kingdom: Animalia
- Phylum: Arthropoda
- Class: Insecta
- Order: Lepidoptera
- Family: Lycaenidae
- Genus: Tongeia
- Species: T. ion

Binomial name
- Tongeia ion Leech, 1891

= Tongeia ion =

Species of butterfly

Tongeia ion is a butterfly of the family Lycaenidae. It was described by John Henry Leech in 1891. Tongeia ion closely resembles Tongeia fischeri.

== Subspecies ==
- T. i. ion western China, Yunnan-Sichuan-Tibet border and also recorded from Thailand.
- T. i. cratylus (Fruhstorfer, 1915) Sichuan-Tibet border (Batang; Mangkang)
- T. i. cellariusi (Bollow, 1930) eastern Gansu (Qinling Mts.)
