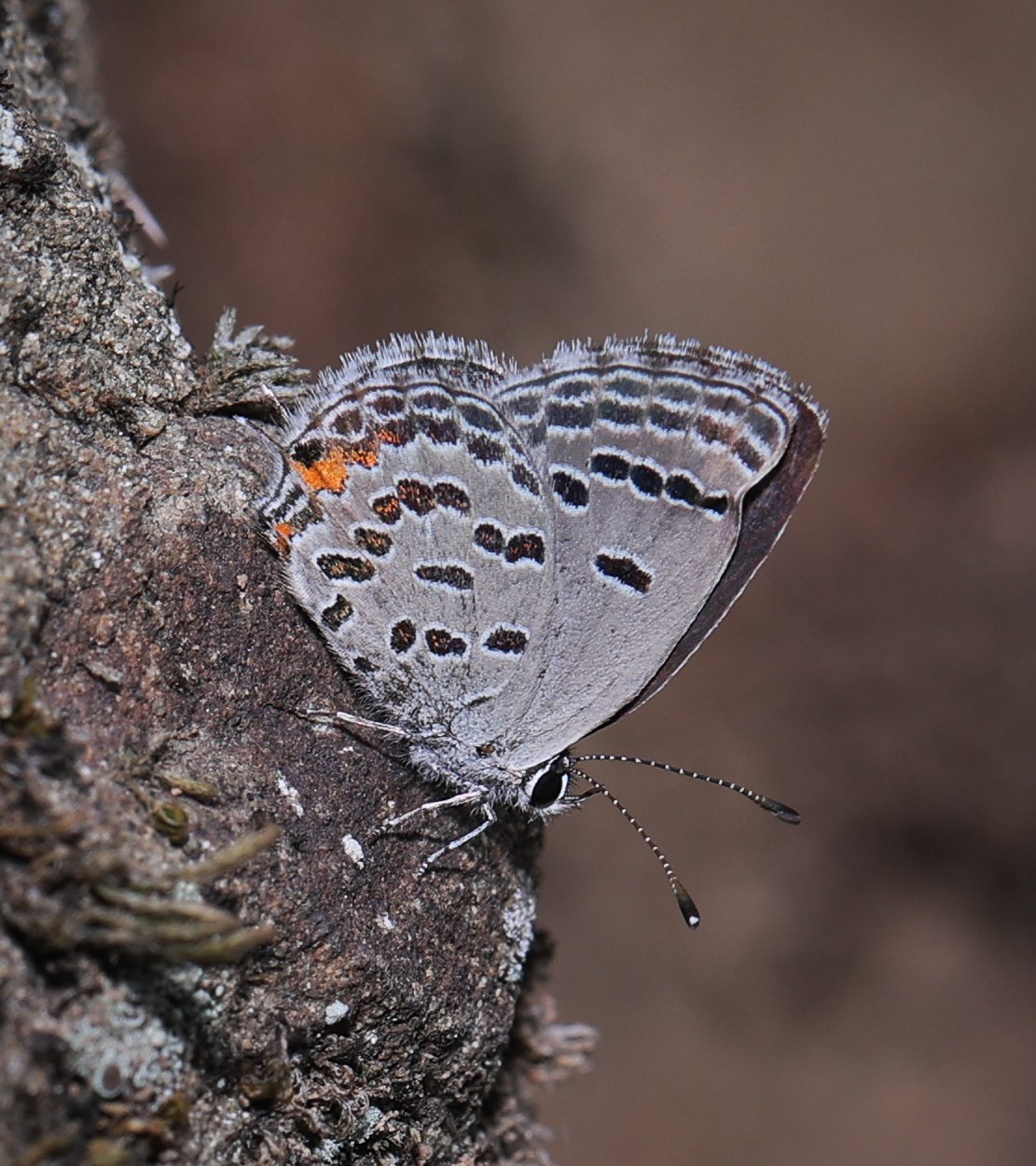

Scientific classification
- Kingdom: Animalia
- Phylum: Arthropoda
- Clade: Pancrustacea
- Class: Insecta
- Order: Lepidoptera
- Family: Lycaenidae
- Genus: Tongeia
- Species: T. kala

Binomial name
- Tongeia kala (de Nicéville, 1890)

Synonyms
- Everes kala de Nicéville, 1890; Elkalyce kala

= Tongeia kala =

Species of butterfly

Tongeia kala, also known as the black cupid, is a butterfly in the family Lycaenidae. It is found in North-east India and nearby regions. It was described by Lionel de Nicéville in 1890. This species is monotypic.

== Description ==
The upperside of both wings is blackish. The forewing has an oval shaped dark-black spot. The hindwing has a series of submarginal black spots. The tail is small, black in color and tipped with white. The underside of both wings in plumbeous gray. The forewing has a series of six distinct deep black spots. The hindwing has a series of similar spots in a convex line across the wing.

This species differs from Tongeia fischeri in having five sub basal spots on the hindwing.
