= IZhK =

- Type: single-shot shotgun
- Place of origin: USSR

Production history
- Designer: V. A. Kazanskiy
- Manufacturer: Izhevsk Mechanical Plant
- Produced: 1955 - 1965

Specifications
- Mass: 3 - 3.25 kg
- Barrel length: 680 - 780mm
- Caliber: 16, 20, 28 and 32 gauge
- Action: Break-action
- Rate of fire: variable
- Sights: iron sights

The IZhK (ИЖК) is a Soviet single-shot, break-action shotgun.

== History ==
IZhK was designed in 1955 and it was based on previous ZK single-shot model. It was made by Izhevsk Mechanical Plant.

Since 1961, a new varnish with improved characteristics has been used to protect the wooden parts of the gun. As a result, since January 1961, the price of one standard IZhK was 19 roubles.

In 1962-1963 new IZh-17 and IZh-18 models were designed as a successors to the IZhK, since 1964 began their serial production. However, the last IZhK shotgun was made in 1965.

== Design ==
The IZhK is simple smoothbore break-action shotgun.

It has steel barrel (made from 50A steel), wooden shoulder stock and fore-end.

== Variants ==
- IZhK-1 (ИЖК-1) - IZhK with chrome barrel, since 1955
- IZhK-2 (ИЖК-2) - IZhK with two interchangeable detachable chokes
- IZhK-3 (ИЖК-3)
- IZhK-4 (ИЖК-4) - 16 gauge IZhK with second detachable 5.6mm rifled barrel. This gun could be turned into a single-shot .22 LR rifle
- IZhK-5 (ИЖК-5) - lightweight version of IZhK shotgun with short 650mm barrel for women and teenagers
- IZhKSh (ИЖКШ) - custom version of IZhK shotgun (it was made in small numbers)

== Users ==
- Soviet Union
- Belarus - IZhK is allowed as civilian hunting weapon
- Moldova - old hunters continued to hunt with IZhK shotguns even in 2001

== Sources ==
- Одноствольное охотничье ружьё ИЖК. Памятка по устройству и обращению.
- Охотничье одноствольное ружьё ИЖК // Охотничье, спортивное огнестрельное оружие. Каталог. М., 1958. стр.11-12
- инженер М. Горбов. Ижевские охотничьи ружья // журнал «Охота и охотничье хозяйство», № 5, май 1962. стр.37-42
- Л. Е. Михайлов, Н. Л. Изметинский. Ижевские охотничьи ружья. 2-е изд., испр. и доп. Ижевск, изд-во «Удмуртия», 1982.
- В. Кречетов. Старые модели. ЗК, ИЖК, ИЖ-17 // журнал "Охота и охотничье хозяйство", № 4, 1991. стр.23
- Ижевское оружие. Том 1. Ижевские ружья / Н. Л. Изметинский, Л. Е. Михайлов. - Ижевск, издательство Удмуртского университета, 1995. - 247 стр. : ил.
