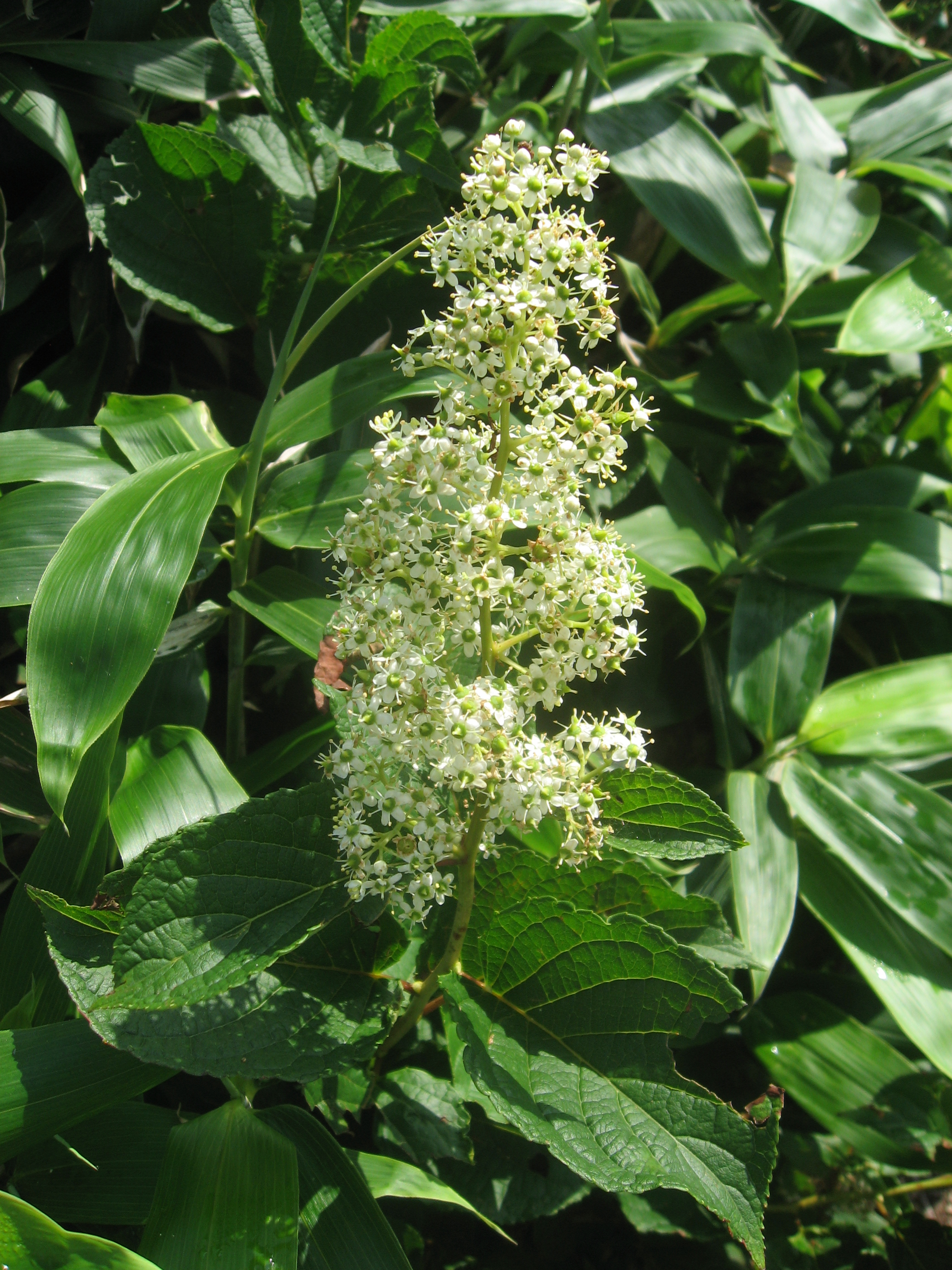

Scientific classification
- Kingdom: Plantae
- Clade: Tracheophytes
- Clade: Angiosperms
- Clade: Eudicots
- Clade: Rosids
- Order: Celastrales
- Family: Celastraceae
- Genus: Tripterygium
- Species: T. regelii

Binomial name
- Tripterygium regelii Sprag. & Takeda

= Tripterygium regelii =

Species of plant

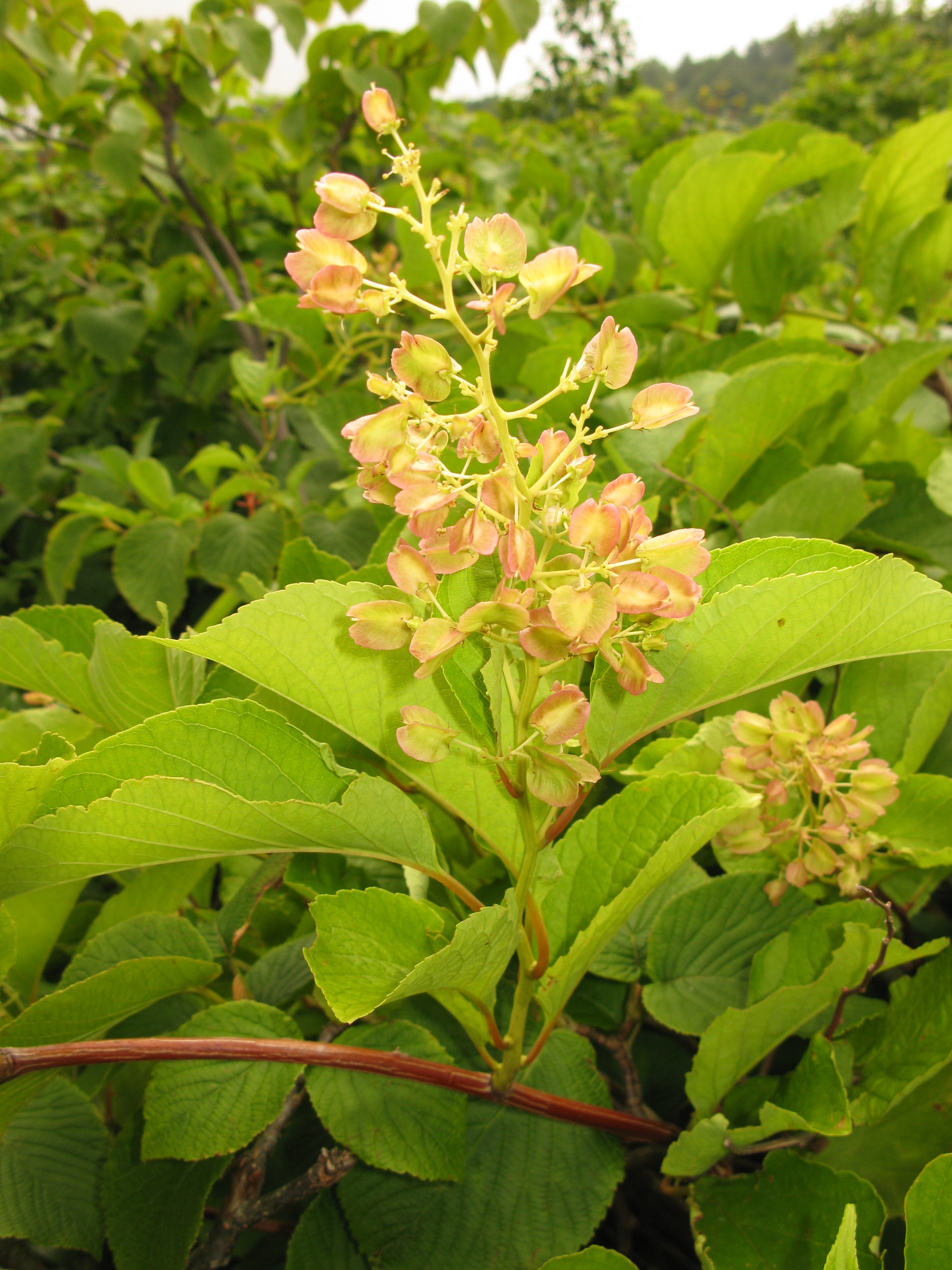
Tripterygium regelii.

Tripterygium regelii, or Regel's threewingnut (Pinyin: Dōngběi léigōng téng), is a rambling, shrubby perennial deciduous yellow vine native to Korea, Japan and Manchuria. It grows to about 200 centimetres (79 in). Small very pretty yellowish white or white flowers appear in May–June and are produced on 203–229 millimetres (8.0–9.0 in) long panicles, and smell somewhat of new-mown hay. Fruits are greenish white, 3-angled, and winged.

"Tripterygium wilfordii Hook.f., known as Leigongteng (Thunder God Vine) in traditional Chinese medicine, has attracted much attention for its applications in relieving autoimmune disorders such as rheumatoid arthritis and systemic lupus erythematosus, and for treating cancer. Molecular analyses of the ITS and 5S rDNA sequences indicate that T. hypoglaucum and T. doianum are not distinct from T. wilfordii, while T. regelii should be recognized as a separate species. The results also demonstrate potential value of rDNA sequence data in forensic detection of adulterants derived from Celastrus angulatus in commercial samples of Leigongteng."

== Pharmacology ==
Tripterygium regelii is listed as a poisonous plant in the U.S. Food and Drug Administration Poisonous Plant Database.

Certain extracts from Tripterygium wilfordii, as well as from T. hypoglaucum (now synonymous with T. regelii) and Tripterygium regelii, were discovered in the 1980s to have temporary antifertility effects, which has led to research on its potential as a contraceptive.

Chemical compounds called hypoglaunines can be isolated from the bark of T. regelii. Hypoglaunine B is a sesquiterpene alkaloid that is a macrolide incorporating a substituted pyridine and dihydroagarofuran moieties. It exhibits anti-HIV activity in vitro.
