= Remington Spartan 100 =

- Type: Shotgun
- Place of origin: Russia

Production history
- Manufacturer: Remington Arms
- Produced: 2005 – c. 2018
- Variants: SPR100; SPR100 Sporting; SPR100 Youth

Specifications
- Mass: 6 1/2 or 6 1/4 pounds
- Length: 44 1/2, 43, 41, or 39 inches
- Barrel length: 29 1/2, 28, 26, or 24 inches
- Caliber: 12 or 20 gauge or .410 bore
- Action: Single-shot, break-action
- Sights: Bead

The Remington Spartan 100 is a single-shot, break-action shotgun. It is a variant of a classical Russian IZh-18 shotgun manufactured by Izhevsk Mechanical Plant for export under trademark "Baikal", in Izhevsk, Russia. It was marketed and distributed by Remington.

The Spartan 100 accepts 2 3/4-inch or 3-inch shotgun shells. It utilizes a cross bolt safety and a selectable ejector or extractor.

== Models ==
=== SPR100 ===
The standard model SPR100 has a blued receiver, hardwood stock and fore-end, and a fixed choke. It is chambered in 12 gauge with a 28-inch barrel, or in 20 gauge or .410 bore with a 26-inch barrel. It weighs 6 1/2 pounds.

An upgraded version of the SPR100 has a nickel-plated receiver, walnut stock and fore-end, and screw-in choke tubes. This variant is a 12 gauge with a 29 1/2-inch barrel.

=== SPR100 Sporting ===
The SPR100 Sporting model has a nickel-plated receiver, walnut stock and fore-end, and screw-in choke tubes. The barrel is ported to reduce felt recoil.

=== SPR100 Youth ===
The SPR100 Youth model is chambered in 20 gauge or .410 bore. It has a 24-inch barrel and weighs 6 1/4 pounds.
