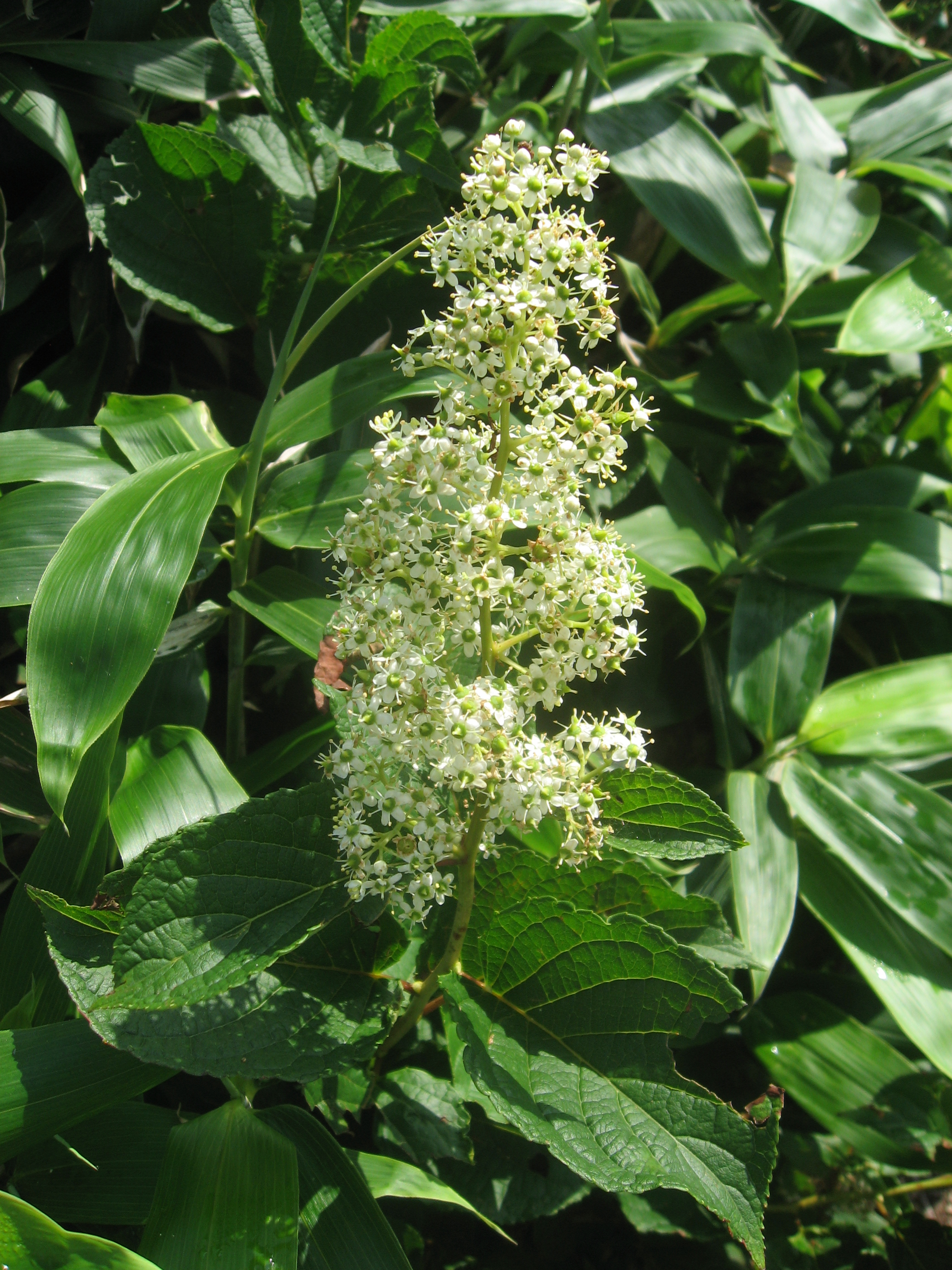
- Tripterygium regelii

Scientific classification
- Kingdom: Plantae
- Clade: Embryophytes
- Clade: Tracheophytes
- Clade: Spermatophytes
- Clade: Angiosperms
- Clade: Eudicots
- Clade: Rosids
- Order: Celastrales
- Family: Celastraceae
- Genus: Tripterygium; Hook.f.

Species
- Tripterygium doianum Ohwi; Tripterygium regelii Sprague & Takeda; Tripterygium wilfordii Hook.f.

= Tripterygium =

Genus of flowering plants

Tripterygium is a genus of plants in the family Celastraceae. It includes three species of lianas or scrambling shrubs native to Japan, Korea, China, Taiwan, Vietnam, and Myanmar. Tripterygium wilfordii is used in Traditional Chinese medicine.

== Species ==
Three species are accepted.

- Tripterygium doianum Ohwi
- Tripterygium regelii Sprague & Takeda
- Tripterygium wilfordii Hook.f.
