= IZh-18 =

Russian single-shot shotgun

- Type: Single-shot shotgun
- Place of origin: USSR

Service history
- In service: 1964–present

Production history
- Manufacturer: Izhevsk Mechanical Plant
- Produced: Since 1964

Specifications
- Mass: 2.4–2.7 kg
- Barrel length: 675 or 730mm
- Caliber: 12, 16, 20, 28 and 32 gauge later .410 bore and .366 TKM
- Action: Break-action
- Rate of fire: Variable
- Sights: Iron sights

The IZh-18 (ИЖ-18) is a single-shot, break-action shotgun.

== History ==
IZh-18 was designed in 1962–1963 as a successor to the IZhK, and in 1964, serial production began.

In November 1964, the price of one standard IZh-18 was 28 rubles.

In January 1979, production of the IZh-18E-20M and IZh-18-410M variants began.

In May 1981, the price of one standard IZh-18 was 22 rubles and 50 kopecks, and the price of one standard IZh-18E was 37 rubles and 50 kopecks.

In 1985, the IZh-18EM shotgun was awarded the golden medal of the International Fair Plovdiv.

Since March 2018 ZAO "Техкрим" began to produce a detachable 520mm barrel ТК600 for IZh-18 shotguns. With the TK600 barrel, the IZh-18 can shoot .366 TKM cartridges.

An unknown number of IZh-18 shotguns were sold in foreign countries.

== Design ==
IZh-18 is a single-shot hammerless takedown shotgun.

The barrel is chrome-plated and has a choke at the muzzle end. The detachable barrel is made from 50A steel (сталь 50A).

Soviet shotguns had a walnut, birch or beech stock and fore-end.

== Variants ==
- IZh-18 (ИЖ-18)
- IZh-18M (ИЖ-18М) – version of IZh-18, since January 1979
- IZh-18E (ИЖ-18Е), with automatic ejector
- IZh-18EM (ИЖ-18ЕМ) – version of IZh-18E, since early 1980s
- IZh-18E-20M (ИЖ-18Е-20М), export variant (IZh-18E chambered in 20/76 mm Magnum shotgun shells)
- IZh-18-410M (ИЖ-18-410М), export variant (IZh-18 chambered in .410/76 mm Magnum shotgun shells)
- IZh-18MK (ИЖ-18МК) – version of IZh-18M, since 1988
- IZh-18M-M (ИЖ-18М-M) – version of IZh-18M, since 1992
- IZh-18MN (ИЖ-18МН) – since 1994, single-shot rifle

== Users ==
- Soviet Union - 1600 IZh-18 shotguns were bought for zoological gardens, animal parks and wildlife sanctuaries of the Soviet Union as tranquilizer guns and auxiliary firearm for employees. Also, these shotguns were allowed as civilian hunting weapon
- Belarus – they were on the territory of BSSR in Soviet times, now they are allowed as civilian hunting weapon
- Bulgaria
- Czech Republic
- Kazakhstan – they were on the territory of Kazakh SSR in Soviet times, now they are allowed as civilian hunting weapon
- Latvia – they were on the territory of Latvian SSR in Soviet times, now they are allowed as civilian hunting weapon
- Moldova – they were on the territory of Moldavian SSR in Soviet times, now they are allowed as civilian hunting weapon
- Russian Federation – they were on the territory of RSFSR in Soviet times, now they are allowed as civilian hunting weapon
- Ukraine – they were on the territory of Ukrainian SSR in Soviet times, now they are allowed as civilian hunting weapon
- United Kingdom – unknown number of shotguns were sold as civilian hunting weapon
- USA – European American Armory began importing IZh-18 shotguns from Russia in 1998. In January 2004, a contract was signed between the Remington Arms (Madison, North Carolina) and the Izhevsk Mechanical Plant. In 2005 Remington Arms began import of IZh-18 shotguns from Russia, they were marketed and distributed by Remington Arms as Remington Spartan 100 and IZh-18MN were sold as Remington SPR 18
- Uzbekistan – they were on the territory of Uzbek SSR in Soviet times, now they are allowed as civilian hunting weapon

== Museum exhibits ==
- One IZh-18EM-M shotgun is in the collection of Tula State Arms Museum in Tula Kremlin.

== Sources ==
- Охотничье одноствольное ружьё ИЖ-18 // Спортивно-охотничье оружие и патроны. Бухарест, "Внешторгиздат", 1965. стр.16–17
- Ружьё модели Иж-18 // Охотничье огнестрельное оружие отечественного производства. Справочное методическое пособие для экспертов-криминалистов, следователей и оперативных работников органов МВД / под ред. А. И. Устинова. М., 1969.
- Л. Е. Михайлов, Н. Л. Изметинский. Ижевские охотничьи ружья. 2-е изд., испр. и доп. Ижевск, изд-во «Удмуртия», 1982. стр.97–118
- ИЖ-18 // А. А. Потапов. Всё об охотничьих ружьях. М., ФАИР-Пресс, 2011. стр.342–343
- Виктор Рон. Нарезная "переломка" из Ижевска // журнал "Оружие", No. 15/16, 2017. стр.64 – ISSN 1728-9203
