= Wildlife contraceptive =

Veterinary pharmaceuticals

Wildlife contraceptives, sometimes referred to as wildlife fertility control, are contraceptives used to regulate the fertility of wild animals. They are used to control population growth of certain wild animals.

== Usage ==
Wildlife contraception has been tested and used in many different species of primarily birds and mammals, likely more that 85 species in total. White-tailed deer may be controlled with contraceptives in suburban areas, where they are sometimes a nuisance. In parts of the United States, does are shot with darts containing a contraceptive vaccine, rendering them temporarily infertile. The Humane Society of the United States runs a deer birth control program, but it is experimental; it may not be cost-effective in the long run. It may cost $300 to $1000 per deer.

One contraceptive vaccine used is porcine zona pellucida (PZP), or derivatives. This form of immunocontraception prevents sperm from accessing an ovum. Another form of deer immunocontraception, called GonaCon, produces antibodies to sex drive hormones in the deer, causing them to lose interest in mating. Similar forms of injectable immunocontraceptives are being studied for use in elk and gray squirrels.

Oral contraceptives may also be developed for population control among a variety of animals, including deer, feral pigs, coyotes, cougars, dogs and cats. One product that has been developed for rodents like mice and rats, which originally went by the name Mouseopause, was approved for commercial use under the name ContraPest. Another project is a five-year development and trial of several oral contraceptives for gray squirrels in the UK. The project has been supported by the UK's Department for Environment, Food and Rural Affairs and aims to "provide an effective, less labour intensive, non-lethal method for managing grey squirrels" by January 2024.

Pigeons have been a target for experimental contraceptives for decades. In 2007, the EPA registered the first product for oral contraception of feral pigeons and other pest birds in the US, called OvoControl P, containing the active ingredient nicarbazin. An oral contraceptive was also introduced in 2005 for the control of Canada geese, but abandoned in 2011 due to regulatory barriers and pressure from hunting groups.

A slow-release hormonal contraceptive implant for female Tasmanian devils is under development. While it may seem counter-intuitive to develop contraceptives for an endangered animal, their use is intended to promote the wild behaviour of mating freely, but without certain females over-contributing to the next generation, which "can have long-term genetic consequences for the insurance population". Contraceptive trials in male devils showed that their testosterone increased, instead of decreasing as other male mammals' testosterone does.

As with any form of wildlife management, wildlife contraceptives can in some cases cause negative side-effects on the welfare of the treated animals, although there is some evidence that it may provide animal welfare benefits as well.

== See also ==
- Neutering
- Xenoestrogen
- Inherited sterility in insects
- Sterile Insect Technique
