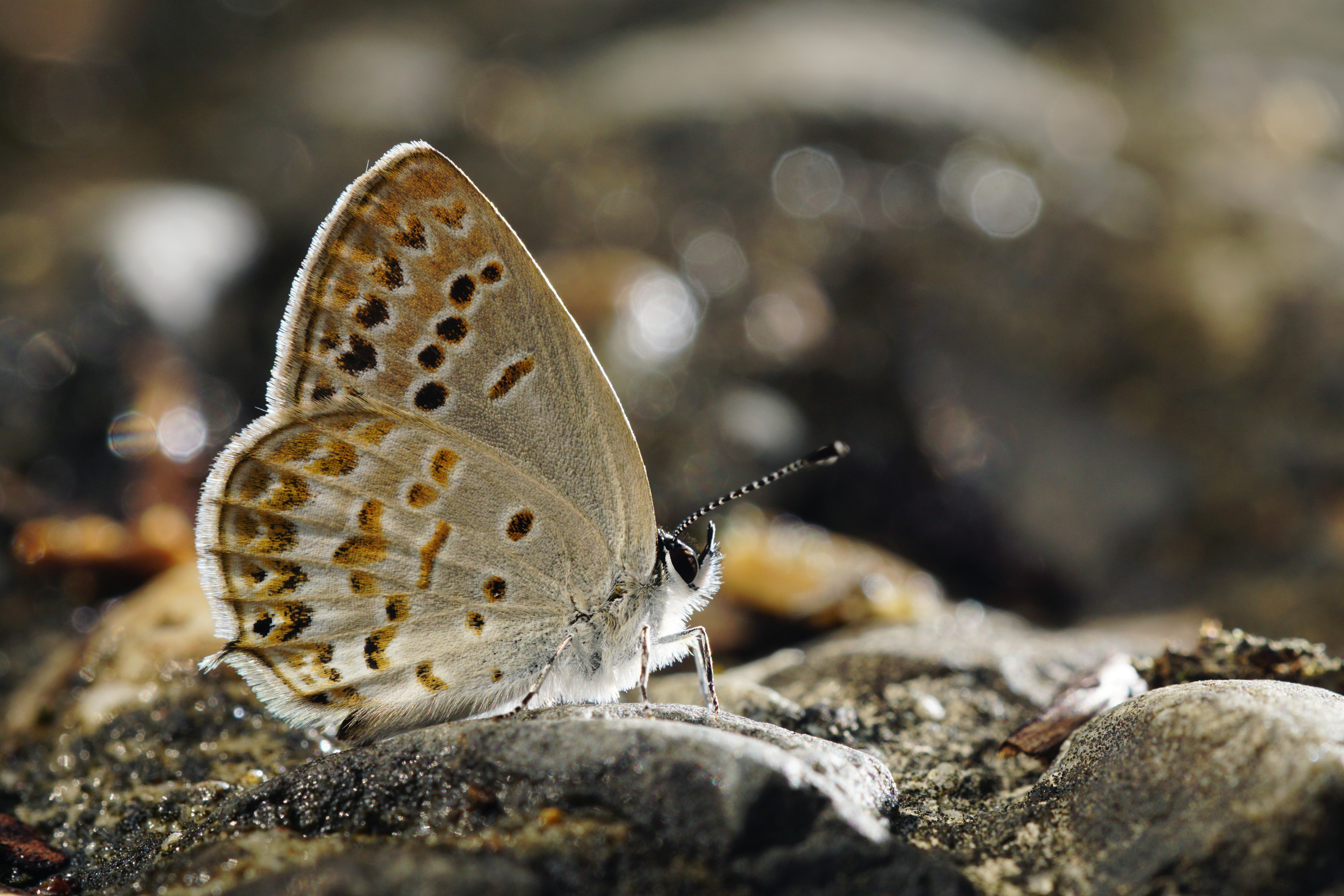
- Tongeia hainani

Scientific classification
- Domain: Eukaryota
- Kingdom: Animalia
- Phylum: Arthropoda
- Class: Insecta
- Order: Lepidoptera
- Family: Lycaenidae
- Subfamily: Polyommatinae
- Tribe: Polyommatini
- Genus: Tongeia; Tutt, 1908

= Tongeia =

Butterfly genus in family Lycaenidae

Tongeia is a Palearctic genus of butterflies in the family Lycaenidae found in temperate East Asia. Most species are endemic to China and many species are recently described from China. The best known species is the more widely distributed Tongeia fischeri (Fischer's blue).

== Species ==
- Tongeia amplifascia Huang, 2001
- Tongeia arata Yakovlev, 2009
- Tongeia arcana (Leech, 1890)
- Tongeia bella Huang, 2001
- Tongeia bisudu Zhdanko & Yakovlev, 2001
- Tongeia burte Churkin, 2003
- Tongeia confusa Huang, 2003
- Tongeia davidi (Poujade, 1884)
- Tongeia dongchuanensis H. Huang & Z. Chen, 2006
- Tongeia filicaudis (Pryer, 1877)
- Tongeia fischeri (Eversmann, 1843) Fischer's blue
- Tongeia germani Yakovlev, 2004
- Tongeia hainani (Bethune-Baker, 1914)
- Tongeia ion (Leech, 1891)
- Tongeia kala de Nicéville, 1890)
- Tongeia menpae Huang, 1998
- Tongeia minima Shou & Yuan, 2006
- Tongeia potanini (Alphéraky, 1889)
- Tongeia pseudozuthus Huang, 2001
- Tongeia shaolinensis Z.G. Wang & Y. Niu, 2002
- Tongeia zuthus (Leech, 1893)

== See also ==
- List of butterflies of China (Lycaenidae)
