= ContraPest =

Contraceptive pest control product

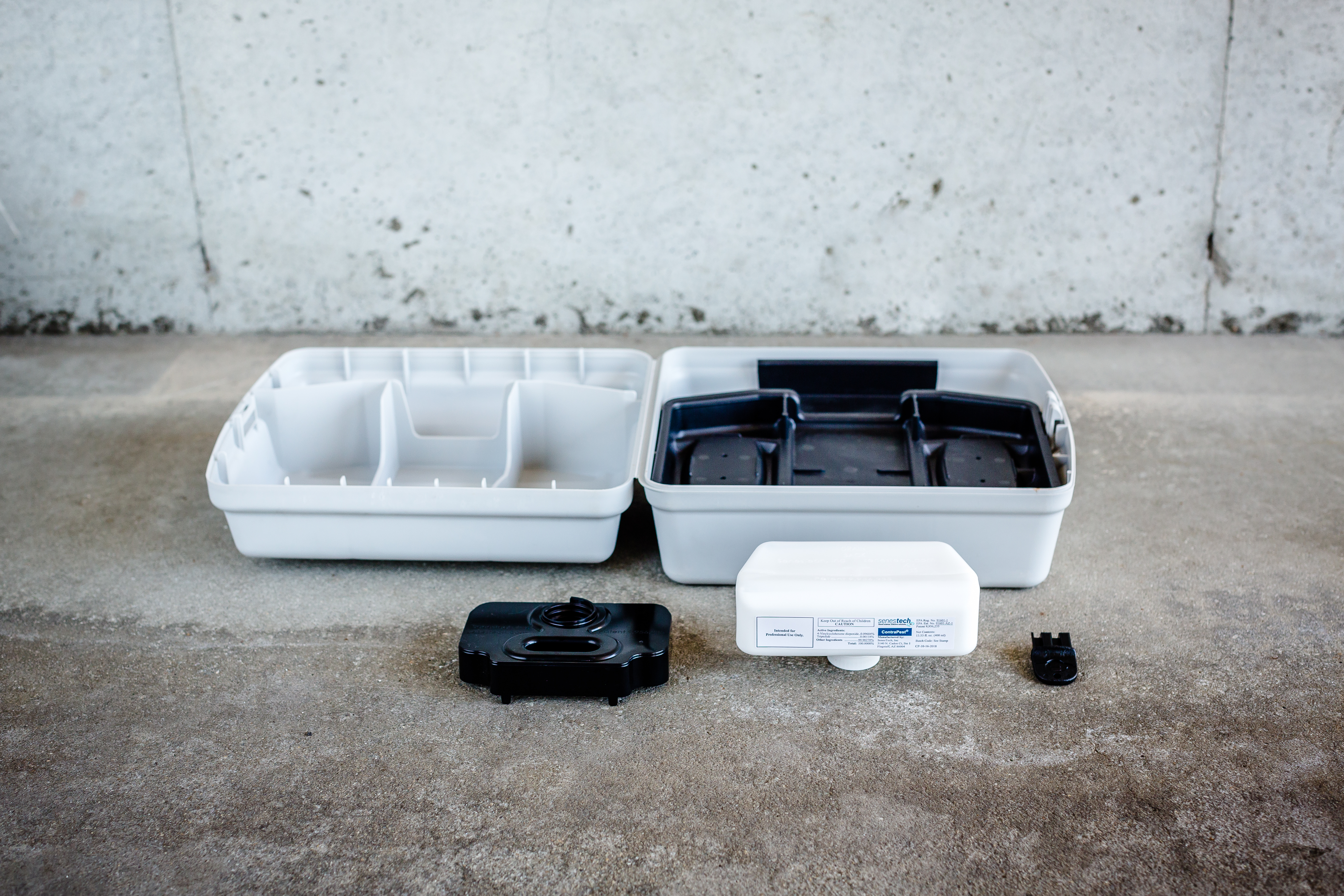
- ContraPest bait station
- Type: Pest control
- Manufacturer: SenesTech
- Available: 2004
- Website: senestech.com/pages/contrapest-liquid

ContraPest is a contraceptive-based pest control tool that causes infertility in brown and black rats. It was originally created to supplement existing rodent control strategies and is formulated as a sweet liquid that appeals to rats. It is developed by the U.S. biotechnology company SenesTech.

ContraPest does not sterilize rats permanently; therefore, a continuous supply of the product is required to be effective. In field tests, SenesTech claims that using ContraPest led to a reduction in rat populations by approximately 40% over a period of 12 weeks or longer. In August 2016, the U.S. Environmental Protection Agency approved ContraPest for commercial use.

== Mechanism ==
The formula was originally developed by Drs. Loretta Mayer and Cheryl Dyer as part of a research program studying heart disease in post-menopausal women using menopausal mice. The first active ingredient of ContraPest is 4-vinylcyclohexene diepoxide (VCD), which causes destruction of the antral follicle during folliculogenesis in the female ovary. ContraPest also contains triptolide, which has been reported to reduce male rat fertility by reducing sperm motility and viability.

Studies conducted by SenesTech claim to demonstrate that prolonged consumption of ContraPest led to a significant decrease in rat fertility. Rats exposed to ContraPest for 50 days experienced infertility lasting up to 100 days, with reduced litter sizes in those that could still reproduce.

A 2020 short-term laboratory trial with wild-caught adult black rats from Hawaii indicated that exposure to ContraPest bait resulted in complete reproductive inhibition for at least 15 consecutive days before mating and throughout a 43-day breeding cycle. The effect persisted through a second breeding cycle, with partial suppression evident in a third cycle. However, fertility rebounded by the fourth cycle. It is uncertain whether the contraceptive effect affects males or females, given that the treatment impacts both sexes. Control group reproduction was not 100%, potentially due to factors like adjustment to captivity or incomplete fertility in the source population. ContraPest did not induce permanent infertility, suggesting it is a contraceptive rather than a sterilant.

Toxicity studies on ContraPest in other animals have revealed few adverse effects. The active ingredients metabolize quickly, typically within 15 minutes. Thus, if a dog or cat consumed a rat that had recently ingested ContraPest, it might experience temporary infertility as a minor side effect.

== Use ==
The city of Washington D.C. was utilizing a 5,000 unit, four-year supply of ContraPest to be used in all eight wards of the city in an attempt to combat the increasing rat population in 2020. Local news reported that the district was unsure of the company's early claims of success in rat control. Trials in the New York City Subway system have suggested ContraPest's efficacy in reducing brown rat populations.

In 2024, a City Council bill in New York proposed deploying contraceptive pellets, including ContraPest, to sterilize both male and female rats in designated areas, aiming to reduce the rat population. On September 26, the city council approved pilot programs to use the contraceptive in an effort to reduce its rodent population. The initiative marked a potential shift in the city's long-standing strategy against its rat infestation and was inspired by the death of Flaco the Owl, which raised concerns about rat poison effects.
