= Triptonide =

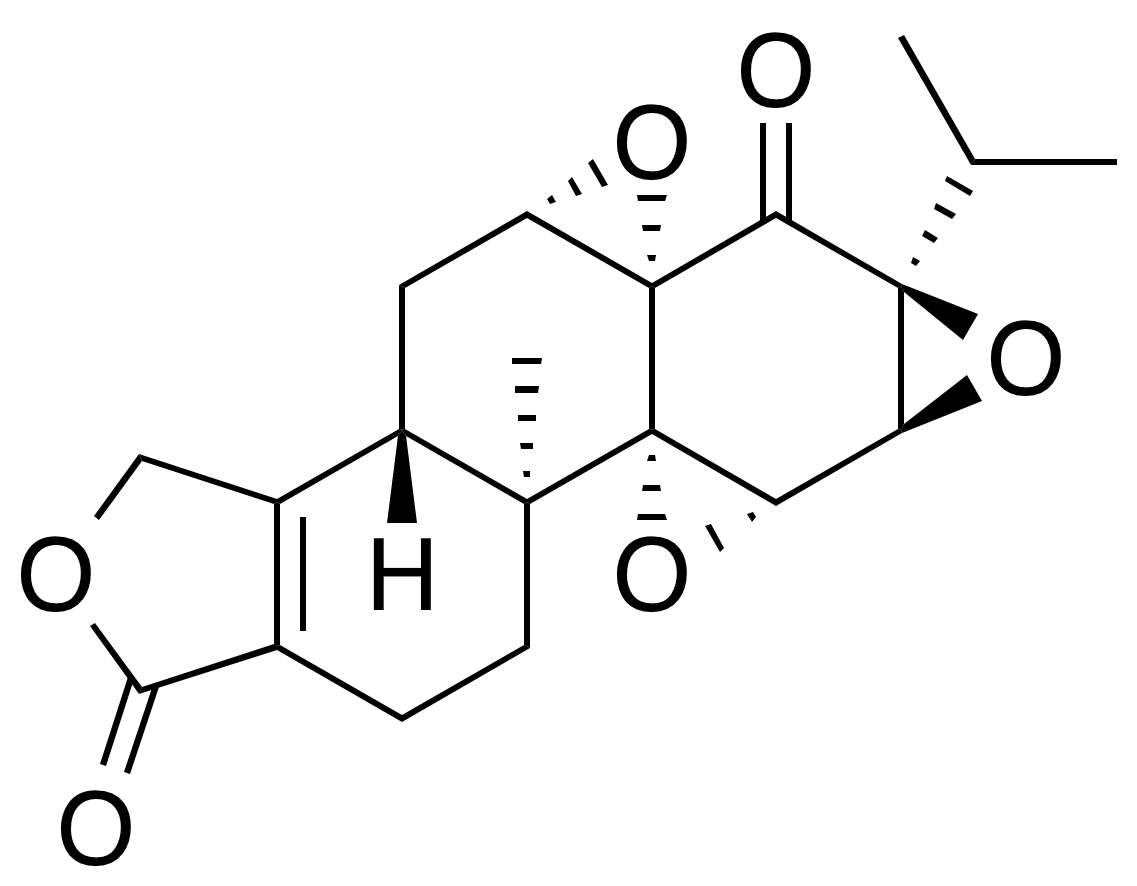

Names
- IUPAC name (1S,2S,4S,5S,7S,9S,11S,13S)-1-methyl-7-propan-2-yl-3,6,10,16-tetraoxaheptacyclo[11.7.0.02,4.02,9.05,7.09,11.014,18]icos-14(18)-ene-8,17-dione
- Other names Triptonide; NSC 165677; 14-deoxy-14-oxo-triptolide

Identifiers
CAS Number	38647-11-9
3D model (JSmol)	Interactive image
ChEBI	CHEBI:132267
ChEMBL	ChEMBL205190
ChemSpider	58875
PubChem CID	65411
- InChI: InChI=1S/C20H22O6/c1-8(2)18-13(25-18)14-20(26-14)17(3)5-4-9-10(7-23-15(9)21)11(17)6-12-19(20,24-12)16(18)22/h8,11-14H,4-7H2,1-3H3/t11-,12-,13-,14-,17-,18-,19+,20+/m0/s1 Key: SWOVVKGLGOOUKI-ZHGGVEMFSA-N
- SMILES: CC(C)[C@@]12[C@@H](O1)[C@H]3[C@@]4(O3)[C@]5(CCC6=C([C@@H]5C[C@H]7[C@]4(C2=O)O7)COC6=O)C

Properties
Chemical formula	C_{20}H_{22}O_{6}
Molar mass	358.390 g·mol^{−1}
- Except where otherwise noted, data are given for materials in their standard state (at 25 °C [77 °F], 100 kPa). Infobox references

Triptonide is a chemical compound found in Tripterygium wilfordii, a plant used in traditional Chinese medicine.
