= SPSh-44 =

Russian pistol

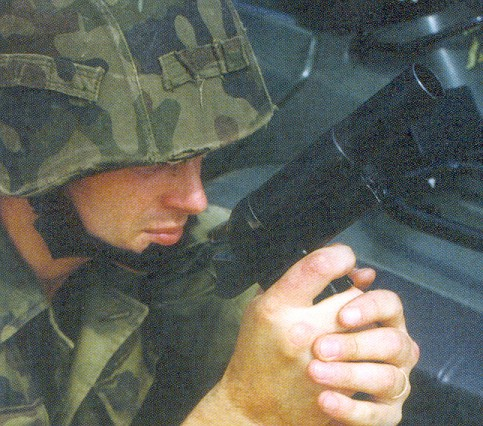
- Type: Flare gun
- Place of origin: Soviet Union

Service history
- In service: Current
- Wars: World War II

Production history
- Designed: 1942-1944
- Produced: since 1944

Specifications
- Mass: 0.87 - 0.88 kg
- Length: 220mm
- Barrel length: 150mm
- Caliber: 26 mm (4 bore)
- Barrels: 1
- Action: Break action
- Rate of fire: Variable

The SPSh-44 (26-мм сигнальный пистолет СПШ-44) is a Soviet signal pistol.

== History ==
The gun was designed by G. S. Shpagin as a replacement for the previous models of the Red Army signal pistol.

In 1943 he made first version of the gun - 26mm SPSh-43 flare (signal) pistol (26-мм осветительный (сигнальный) пистолет СПШ-43). In January 1944, The second version of this pistol was made - SPSh-2 (СПШ-2).

After tests and trials, in 1944 SPSh-2 flare gun was officially adopted as the new standard Red Army signal pistol. In May 1944 it began mass production as SPSh-44 signal pistol.

Later it became the standard flare gun in all Warsaw Pact countries.

In the mid-1970s, experimental cartridges for immobilization of wild animals for SPSh-44 signal pistol were made and tested.

== Design ==
The SPSh-44 is a single-shot break-action smoothbore flare gun.

== Variants ==
- OSSh-42 (ОСШ-42) - the first test prototype with 140mm barrel (1.09 kg)
- Pistolet sygnałowy wz. 1944 - copy of SPSh-44, made since 1948 by Zakłady Metalowe im. gen. "Waltera" in Polish People's Republic
- Type 57 - copy of SPSh-44, made in the People's Republic of China
- SPSh-26M KZ (СПШ-26М KZ) - copy of SPSh-44, made by Uralsk machine-building plant "Metallist" (in Uralsk, Kazakhstan).
- Keserű Muvek Rubber Protector - is a single-shot traumatic pistol manufactured by the Hungarian company " Keserű " by reworking the SPSh. It has separate loading with a 28-mm rubber bullet and a blank cartridge .380 Knall, and can be owned without license in Hungary

== Users ==
- Soviet Union
- Belarus
- Poland
- Russian Federation
- Turkmenistan - Armed Forces of Turkmenistan
- Ukraine
