= Porcine zona pellucida =

Porcine zona pellucida (PZP) is the zona pellucida extracted from the ovaries of pigs which is used as a source of antigens for immunocontraception.

The zona pellucida is a thick membrane that surrounds the unfertilised eggs of mammals. In order for an egg to be fertilised, sperm must first bind to, and then penetrate the zona pellucida. When porcine (pig) zona pellucida is injected into other mammals, antibodies are produced which attach to that animal's zona pellucida, preventing the sperm from attaching to the egg, therefore preventing fertilisation.

Porcine zona pellucida has been used in wildlife contraception since the late 1980s. Animals with which PZP has been employed in this context include elephants, wild and/or feral horses, elk and whitetailed deer. It can be administered to captured animals via a standard syringe or administered to free ranging wildlife with a dart gun. The contraceptive effect last for approximately one year in horses, and can potentially be extended by including a controlled-release PZP component.
