= Triptolide =

Names
- Preferred IUPAC name (3bS,4aS,5aS,6R,6aR,7aS,7bS,8aS,9bS)-6-Hydroxy-8b-methyl-6a-(propan-2-yl)-3b,4,4a,5a,6,6a,7a,7b,8a,8b,9,10-dodecahydrotris(oxireno)[2′,3′:4b,5;2′′,3′′:6,7;2′′′,3′′′:8a,9]phenanthro[1,2-c]furan-1(3H)-one

Identifiers
| CAS Number | 38748-32-2 |
| 3D model (JSmol) | Interactive image |
| ChEBI | CHEBI:9747 |
| ChemSpider | 97099 |
| ECHA InfoCard | 100.208.723 |
| KEGG | C09204 |
| PubChem CID | 107985 |
| UNII | 19ALD1S53J |
| CompTox Dashboard (EPA) | DTXSID5041144 |
- InChI: InChI=1S/C20H24O6/c1-8(2)18-13(25-18)14-20(26-14)17(3)5-4-9-10(7-23-15(9)21)11(17)6-12-19(20,24-12)16(18)22/h8,11-14,16,22H,4-7H2,1-3H3/t11-,12-,13-,14-,16+,17-,18-,19+,20+/m0/s1 Key: DFBIRQPKNDILPW-CIVMWXNOSA-N
- SMILES: CC(C)[C@@]12[C@@H](O1)[C@H]3[C@@]4(O3)[C@]5(CCC6=C([C@@H]5C[C@H]7[C@]4([C@@H]2O)O7)COC6=O)C

Properties
| Chemical formula | C_{20}H_{24}O_{6} |
| Molar mass | 360.406 g·mol^{−1} |
| Solubility in water | 0.017 mg/mL |
- Except where otherwise noted, data are given for materials in their standard state (at 25 °C [77 °F], 100 kPa). Infobox references

Triptolide is a diterpenoid epoxide which is produced by the thunder god vine, Tripterygium wilfordii. It has in vitro and in vivo activities against mouse models of polycystic kidney disease and pancreatic cancer, but its physical properties and severe toxicity limit its therapeutic potential. Consequently, a synthetic water-soluble prodrug, minnelide, is being studied clinically instead.

Triptolide is a component of ContraPest, a contraceptive pest control liquid used to reduce rat populations in the United States.

== Mechanism of action ==
Several putative target proteins of triptolide have been reported, including polycystin-2, ADAM10, DCTPP1, TAB1, and XPB. Multiple triptolide-resistant mutations exist in XPB (ERCC3) and its partner protein GTF2H4. However, no triptolide-resistant mutations were found in polycystin-2, ADAM10, DCTPP1 and TAB1. Cys342 of XPB was identified as the residue that undergoes covalent modification by the 12,13-epoxide group of triptolide, and the XPB-C342T mutant rendered the T7115 cell line nearly completely resistant to triptolide. The level of resistance conferred by the C342T mutation is about 100-fold higher than the most triptolide-resistant mutants previously identified. Together, these results validate XPB as a target responsible for the antiproliferative activity of triptolide. The disruption of super-enhancer networks has also been suggested as a mechanism of action.

== Water-soluble prodrugs ==
Minnelide is a more water-soluble synthetic prodrug of triptolide which is converted to triptolide in vivo. In a preclinical mouse model of pancreatic cancer, it was "even more effective than gemcitabine". Its Phase II clinical trials are expected to conclude in February 2019.

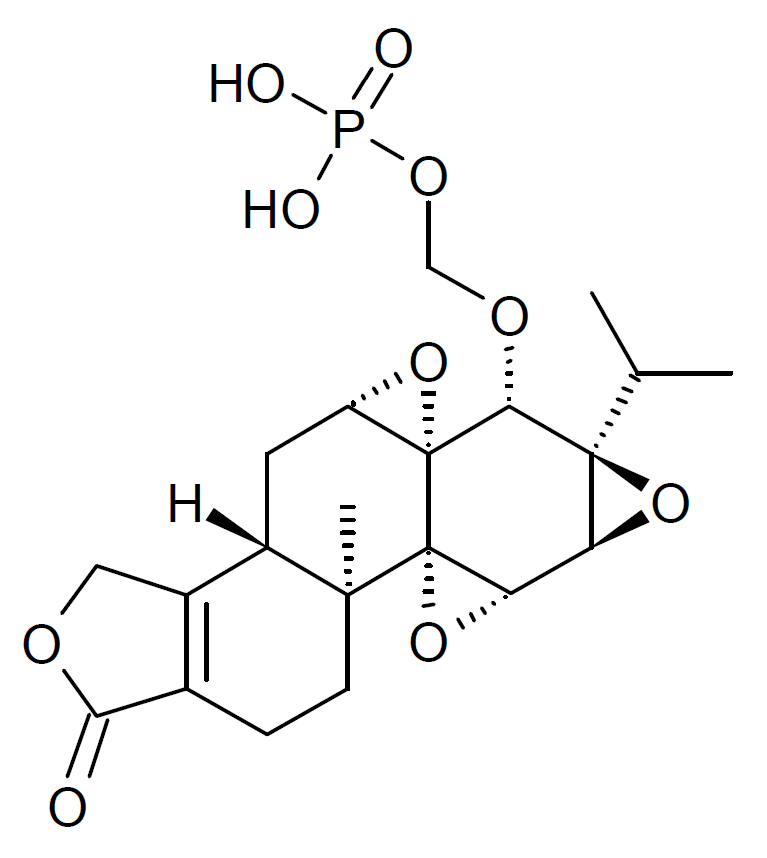
Minnelide

Glutriptolide, a glucose conjugate of triptolide with better solubility and lower toxicity, did not inhibit XPB activity in vitro, but exhibited tumor control in vivo, which is likely due to sustained stepwise release of active triptolide within cancer cells. A second generation glutriptolide has been recently reported for targeting hypoxic cancer cells with increased glucose transporter expression.
