= 4-Vinylcyclohexene =

- 4-Vinylcyclohexene

Names
- Preferred IUPAC name 4-Ethenylcyclohex-1-ene
- Other names: Butadiene dimer; 4-Ethenylcyclohexene; 1-Vinyl-3-cyclohexene; 4-Vinyl-1-cyclohexene

Identifiers
CAS Number	100-40-3
3D model (JSmol)	Interactive image
ChEBI	CHEBI:82377
ChEMBL	ChEMBL1330194
ChemSpider	7218
ECHA InfoCard	100.002.590
EC Number	202-848-9
KEGG	C19310
PubChem CID	7499
RTECS number	GW6650000
UNII	212JQJ15PS
CompTox Dashboard (EPA)	DTXSID3021437
- InChI: InChI=1S/C8H12/c1-2-8-6-4-3-5-7-8/h2-4,8H,1,5-7H2 Key: BBDKZWKEPDTENS-UHFFFAOYSA-N; InChI=1/C8H12/c1-2-8-6-4-3-5-7-8/h2-4,8H,1,5-7H2 Key: BBDKZWKEPDTENS-UHFFFAOYAZ
- SMILES: C=CC1C\C=C/CC1

Properties
Chemical formula	C_{8}H_{12}
Molar mass	108.184 g·mol^{−1}
Appearance	Colorless liquid
Density	0.8299 g/cm^{3} at 20°C
Melting point	−108.9 °C (−164.0 °F; 164.2 K)
Boiling point	128.9 °C (264.0 °F; 402.0 K)
Solubility in water	0.05 g/L
Solubility	soluble in benzene, diethyl ether, petroleum ether
Vapor pressure	2 kPa
Refractive index (n_{D})	1.4639 (20 °C)

Hazards
- GHS labelling
Pictograms	(GHS08: Health hazard)
Signal word	Warning
Hazard statements	H351
Precautionary statements	P201, P202, P281, P308+P313, P405, P501
NFPA 704 (fire diamond)	0 3
Flash point	21.2 °C (70.2 °F; 294.3 K)
Autoignition temperature	269 °C (516 °F; 542 K)
- Lethal dose or concentration (LD, LC)
LD_{50} (median dose)	2563 mg/kg (oral, rat)
Safety data sheet (SDS)	Oxford University

Related compounds
Related compounds	Buta-1,3-diene; Cyclohexene
- Except where otherwise noted, data are given for materials in their standard state (at 25 °C [77 °F], 100 kPa). verify (what is ?) Infobox references

4-Vinylcyclohexene is an organic compound consisting of a vinyl group attached to the 4-position of the cyclohexene ring. It is a colorless liquid. Although chiral, it is used mainly as the racemate. It is a precursor to vinylcyclohexene dioxide.

== Production ==
It is produced by buta-1,3-diene dimerization in a Diels-Alder reaction. The reaction is conducted at 110 - 425 °C at pressures of 1.3 - 100 MPa in the presence of a catalyst. A mixture of silicon carbide and salts of copper or chromium comprises the catalyst. A competing product is 1,5-cyclooctadiene.

In North America this is produced by Nippon Chemical Texas Inc. in Pasadena, TX.

== Safety ==
4-Vinylcyclohexene is classified as a Group 2B carcinogen by the IARC ("possibly carcinogenic to humans").
