= Brucellosis vaccine =

Vaccine protecting livestock animals from brucellosis

Vaccine description
- Target: Brucellosis
- Vaccine type: Attenuated

Clinical data
- ATC code: J07AD01 (WHO)

Identifiers
- ChemSpider: none

Brucellosis vaccine is a vaccine for cattle, sheep and goats used against brucellosis. It is an attenuated vaccine based on a modified brucellosis bacteria.

Currently, there is no vaccine available for humans.
