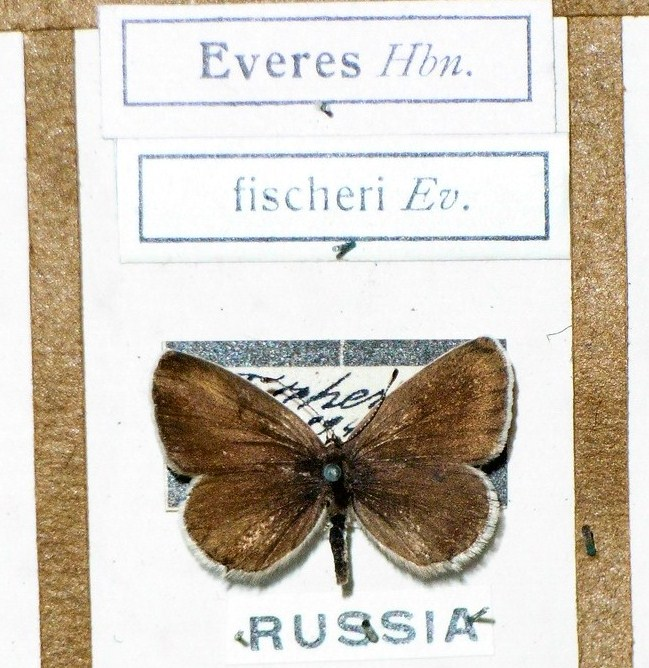

Scientific classification
- Domain: Eukaryota
- Kingdom: Animalia
- Phylum: Arthropoda
- Class: Insecta
- Order: Lepidoptera
- Family: Lycaenidae
- Genus: Tongeia
- Species: T. fischeri

Binomial name
- Tongeia fischeri (Eversmann, 1843)

Synonyms
- Lycaena fischeri Eversmann, 1843; Everes fischeri; Cupido fischeri

= Tongeia fischeri =

Species of butterfly

Tongeia fischeri, or Fischer's blue, is a butterfly of the family Lycaenidae. It was described by Eduard Friedrich Eversmann in 1843. It is found in south-eastern Europe, the southern Ural, northern and eastern Kazakhstan, south-western and southern Siberia, the Russian Far East (Primorye, southern Sakhalin), Mongolia, China, Korea and Japan.

== Description ==
E. fischeri Ev. (78 b, c). Above both sexes black-brown, the male with a chain of very thin blue-white dashes before the margin of the hindwing. Beneath very similar to the preceding [Everes argiades], but the ground colour darker grey, the dots more distinct and coarser, and the orange anal band of the hindwing not so prominent.— From the Ural throughout Siberia to the Pacific, in Corea and on Askold, in June and again in August; mostly- singly.

== Subspecies ==
- T. f. fischeri
- T. f. caudalis (Bryk, 1946) (Korea)
- T. f. dea Zhdanko, 2000 (Amur)
- T. f. sachalinensis (Matsumura, 1925) (Sakhalin)

== Biology ==
Larvae feed on various succulent plants, including Orostachys japonica.

== Etymology ==
The name honours Fischer von Waldheim, Grigory Ivanovich (1771–1853) - naturalist, entomologist and paleontologist, founder of the Moscow Society of Naturalists, first director of the Zoological Museum of Moscow State University.
