= DCTP pyrophosphatase 1 =

Protein-coding gene in the species Homo sapiens

DCTPP1
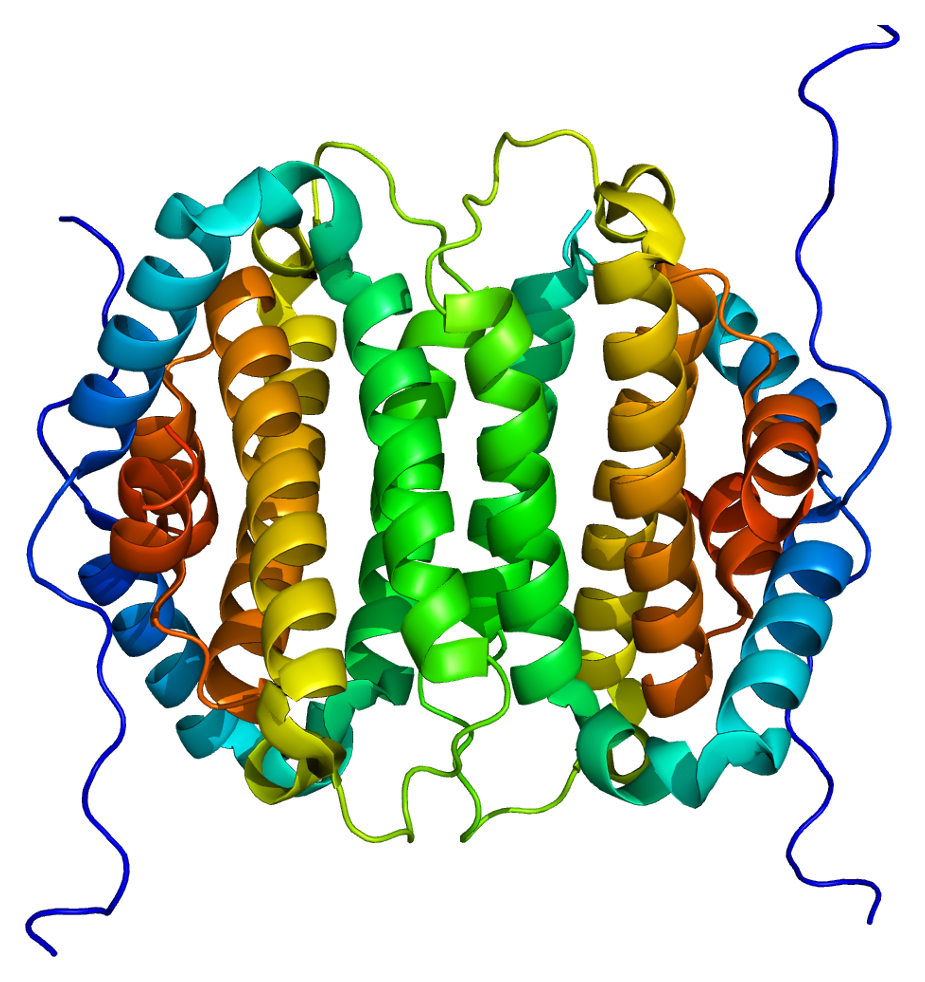

Identifiers
- Aliases: DCTPP1, RS21C6, XTP3TPA, CDA03, XTP3-transactivated gene A protein, dCTP pyrophosphatase 1
- External IDs: OMIM: 615840; MGI: 1913672; GeneCards: DCTPP1
Available structures
PDB	Ortholog search: PDBe RCSB
PDB	List of PDB id codes 2A3Q, 2OIE, 2OIG, 2Q4P
Enzyme activity
EC #	BRENDA	ExPASy	KEGG	MetaCyc
3.6.1.12	↗	↗	↗	↗

Gene location (Human)
Chr.	Chromosome 16 (human)
Band	16p11.2	Start	30,423,615 bp
Band	16p11.2	End	30,430,030 bp

Gene location (Mouse)
Chr.	Chromosome 7 (mouse)
Band	7|7 F3	Start	126,856,131 bp
Band	7|7 F3	End	126,859,881 bp
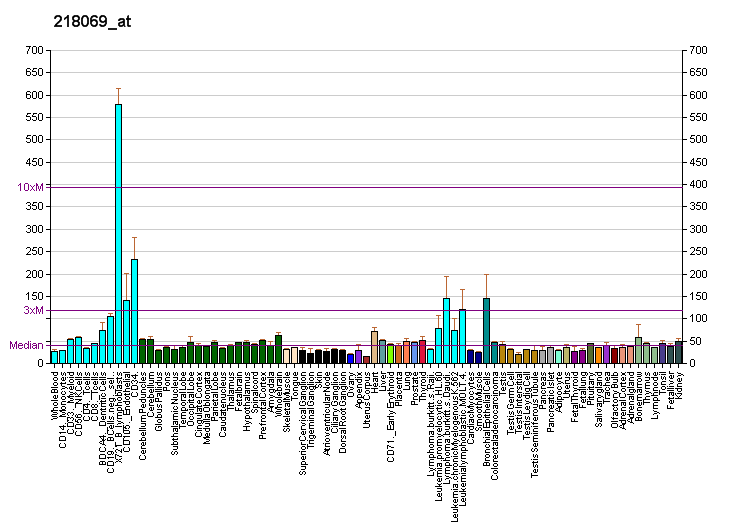
RNA expression pattern
Bgee	Human / Mouse (ortholog); Top expressed in: mucosa of transverse colon; rectum; parotid gland; oocyte; gonad; mucosa of sigmoid colon; endothelial cell; nasal epithelium; hair follicle; pancreatic ductal cell / Top expressed in: embryo; embryo; epiblast; yolk sac; otic placode; primitive streak; somite; ventricular zone; medial ganglionic eminence; morula; More reference expression data
BioGPS	More reference expression data
Gene ontology
Molecular function	nucleotide binding; pyrophosphatase activity; protein binding; hydrolase activity; magnesium ion binding; metal ion binding; identical protein binding; pyrimidine deoxyribonucleotide binding; dCTP diphosphatase activity; nucleoside-triphosphate diphosphatase activity
Cellular component	cytoplasm; cytosol; nucleus; mitochondrion
Biological process	protein homotetramerization; dCTP catabolic process; nucleoside triphosphate catabolic process; DNA protection; dTTP catabolic process
Sources:Amigo / QuickGO
Orthologs
Databases	NCBI: entry; OMA: entry
Species	Human	Mouse
Entrez	79077	66422
Ensembl	ENSG00000179958	ENSMUSG00000042462
UniProt	Q9H773	Q9QY93
RefSeq (mRNA)	NM_024096	NM_023203
RefSeq (protein)	NP_077001	NP_075692
Location (UCSC)	Chr 16: 30.42 – 30.43 Mb	Chr 7: 126.86 – 126.86 Mb
PubMed search
- Wikidata
View/Edit Human	View/Edit Mouse

dCTP pyrophosphatase 1 is an enzyme that in humans is encoded by the DCTPP1 gene.

== See also ==
- Deoxycytidine triphosphate (dCTP)
- Transactivation
