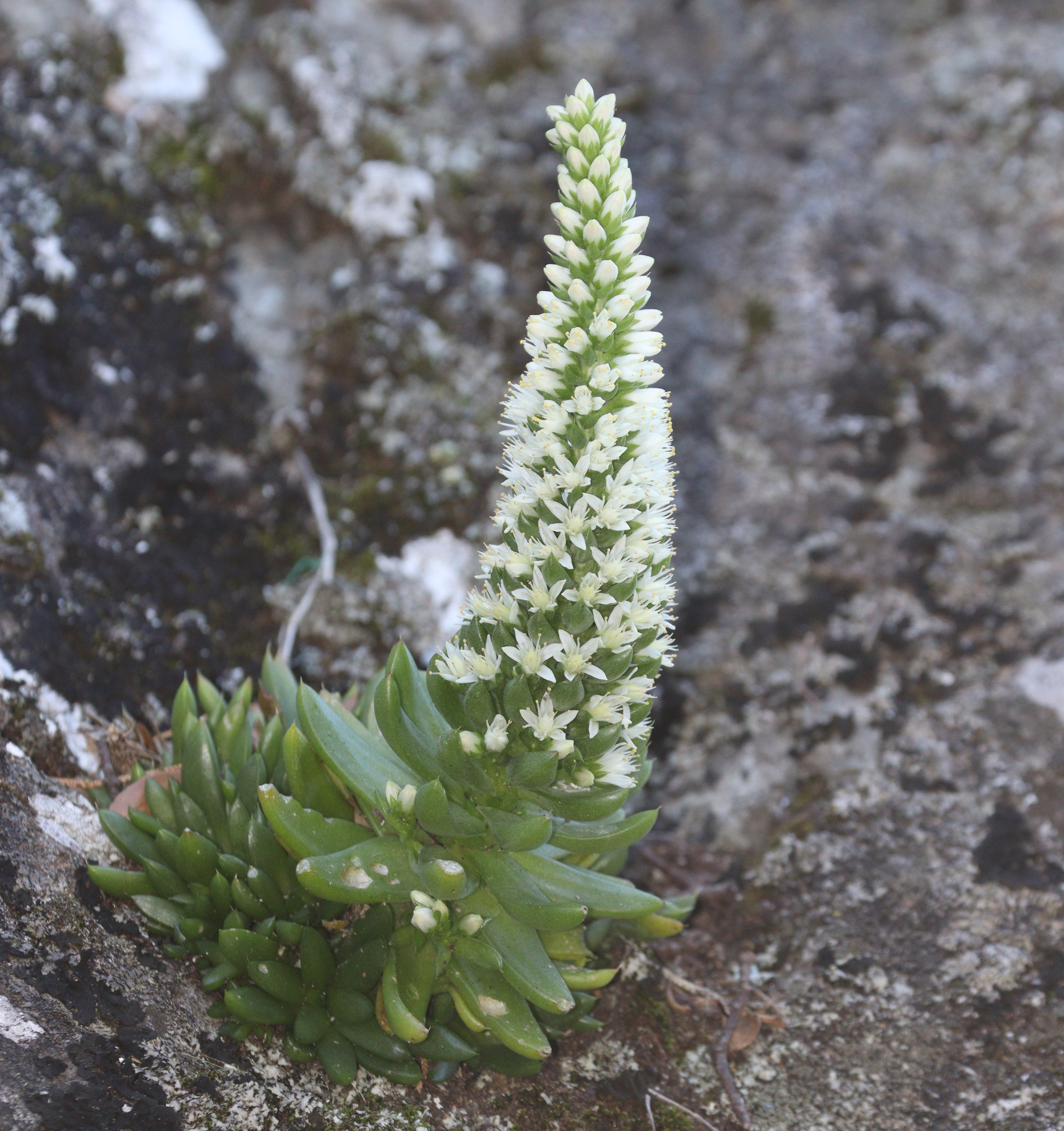
- In Izu Peninsula, Japan

Scientific classification
- Kingdom: Plantae
- Clade: Embryophytes
- Clade: Tracheophytes
- Clade: Angiosperms
- Clade: Eudicots
- Order: Saxifragales
- Family: Crassulaceae
- Genus: Orostachys
- Species: O. japonica

Binomial name
- Orostachys japonica (Maxim.) A.Berger

Synonyms
- Cotyledon japonica Maxim. Cotyledon polycephala Makino; Orostachys japonica f. polycephala (Makino) H.Ohba; Orostachys kanboensis Ohwi; Orostachys polycephala (Makino) H.Hara; Sedum japonicola Makino; Sedum polycephalum (Makino) Makino

= Orostachys japonica =

Species of flowering plant

Orostachys japonica (Japanese: 爪蓮華), also known as rock pine, is a species of flowering plant in the family Crassulaceae. Native to East Asia. Its main habitat is on the surface of mountain rocks in Korea, Japan and China.

== Ecology ==
Orostachys japonica is a biennial/perennial plant growing to 10 centimetres (3.9 in). It is in flower from September to October. The flowers are hermaphrodite. The rosette leaves shape like a spatula.

- Suitable for: light sandy and loamy soils, prefers well-drained soil and can grow in nutritionally poor soil.
- Suitable pH: acid, neutral and basic alkaline soils.

Because of its growing shape which resembles a pine tree's cone, and its habit of growing on mountain rocks, it is also called "rock pine". It grows well in a sunny or semi-shaded (light woodland) location with a well-drained and moist soil that is low in nutrients. Its flowers bloom from September to October. The flowers are white and each flower has 5 conical petals. The flower lacks a peduncle. Its calyx is divided into 5 parts. When the flowers bloom and produce seeds, it dries out.

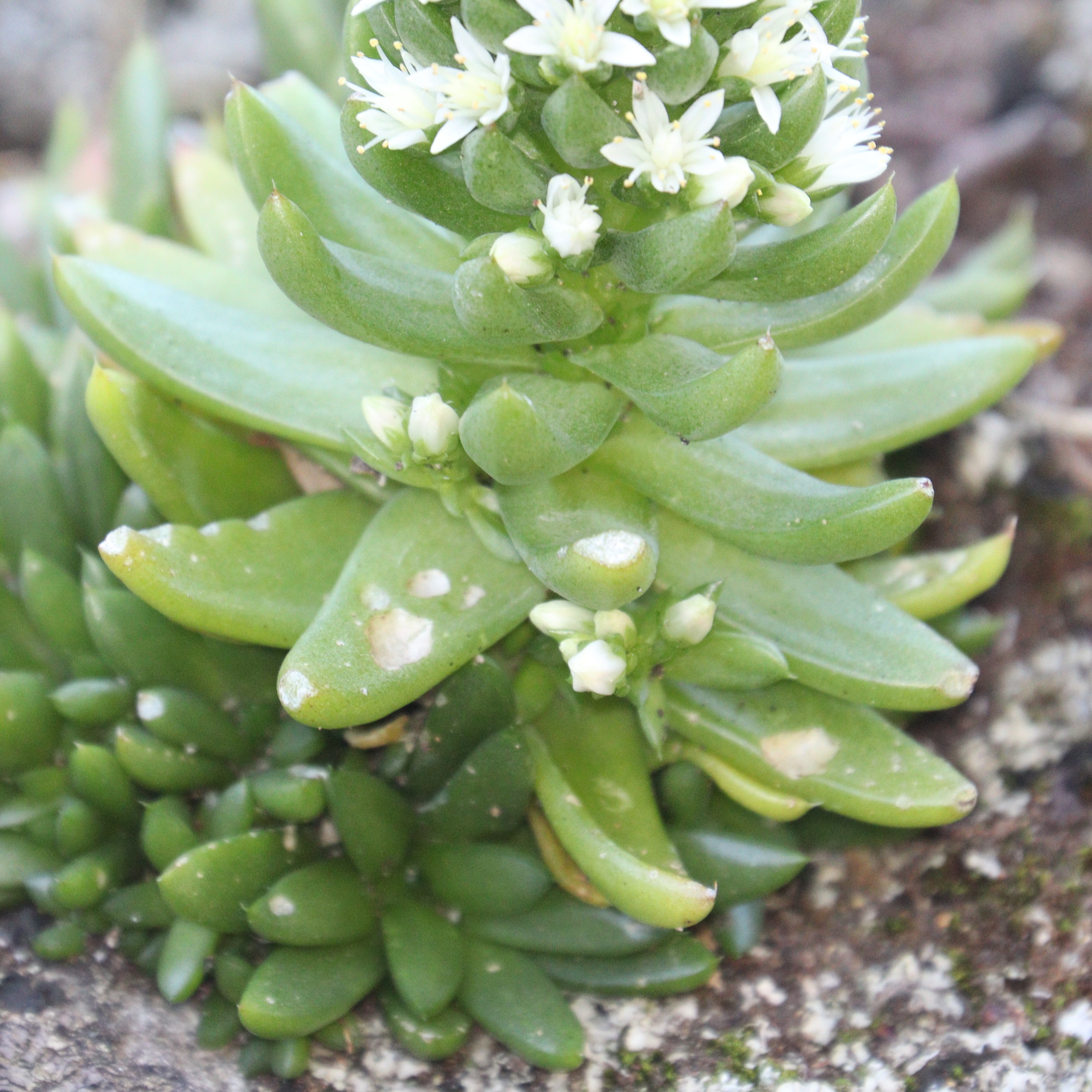
Leaf

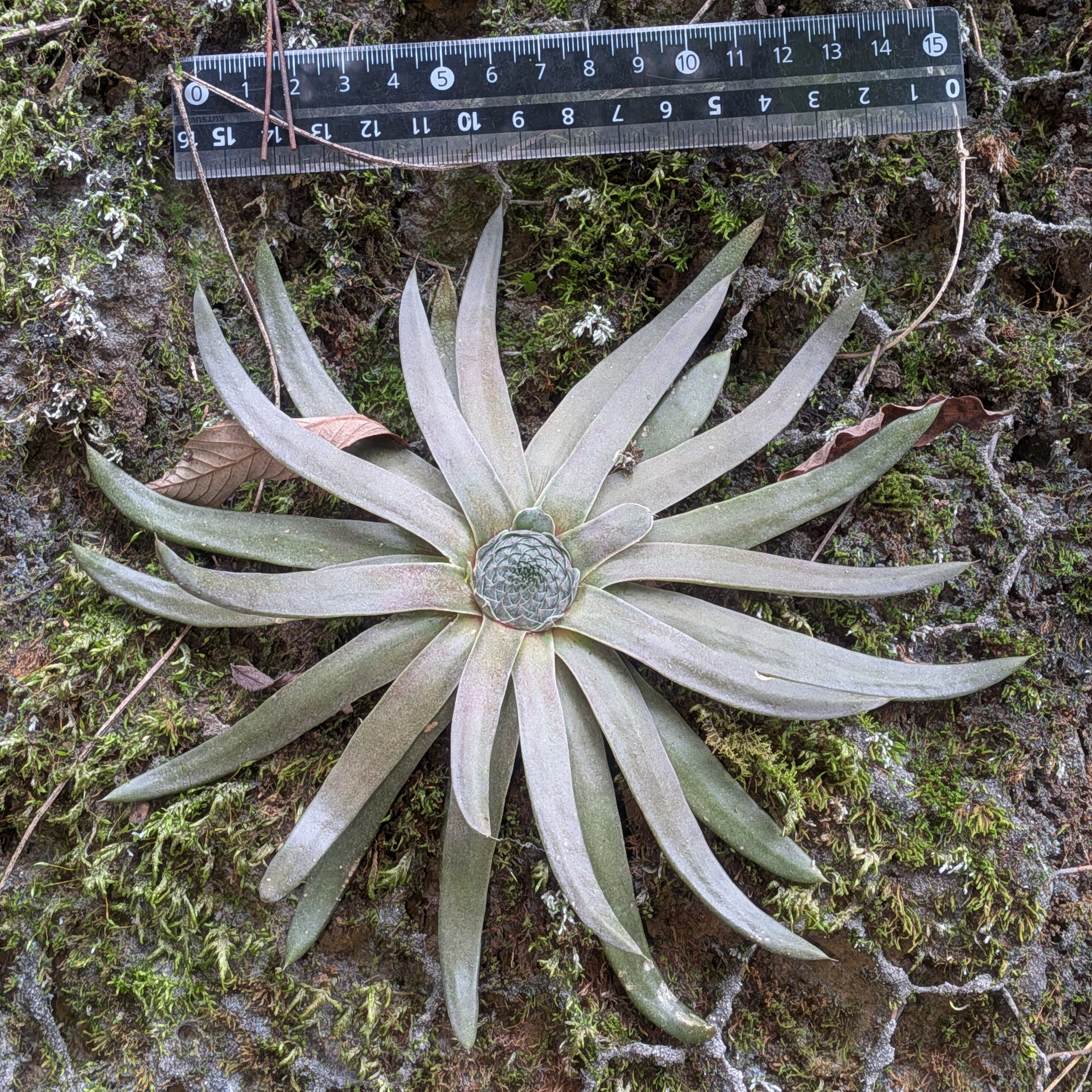
Rosette

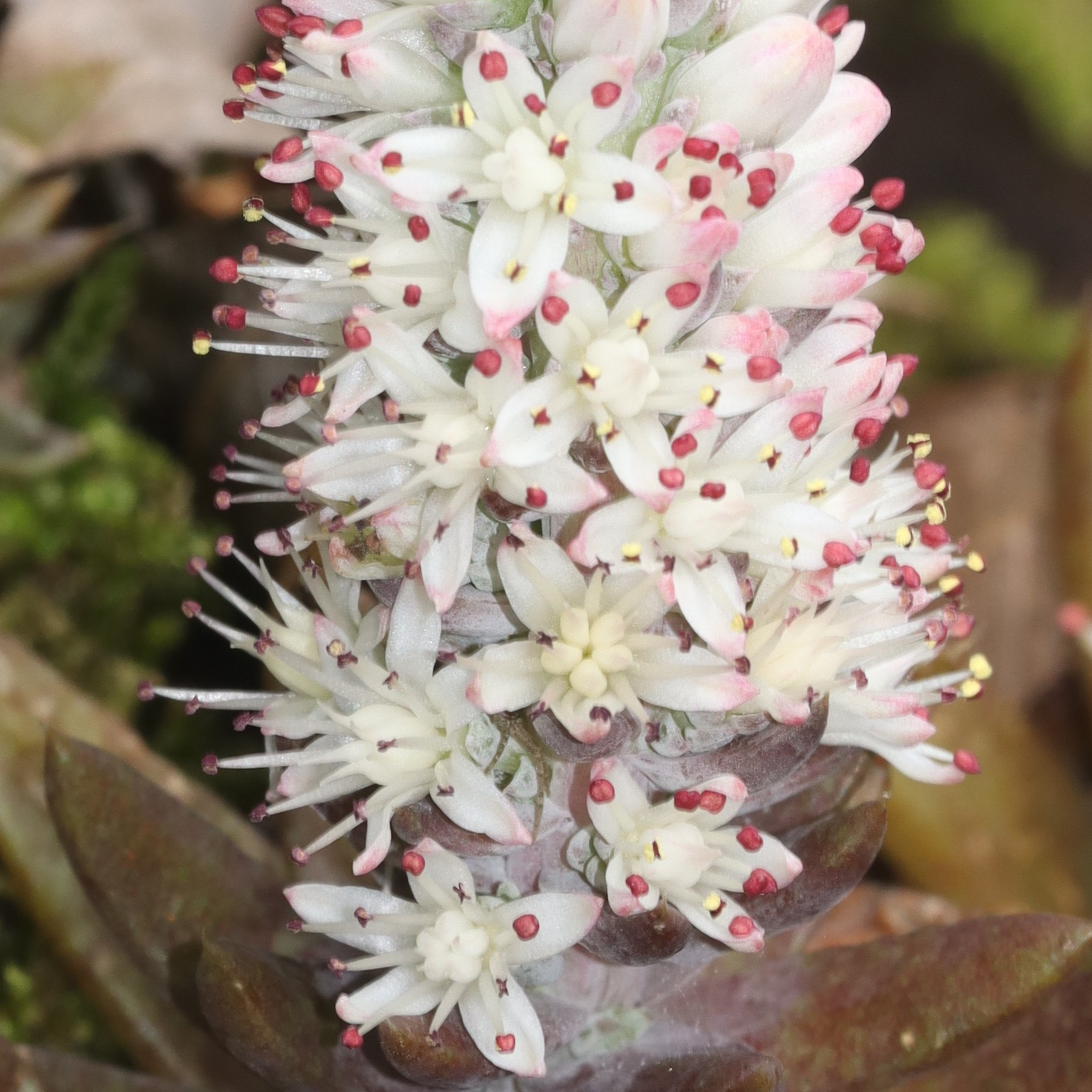
Flower

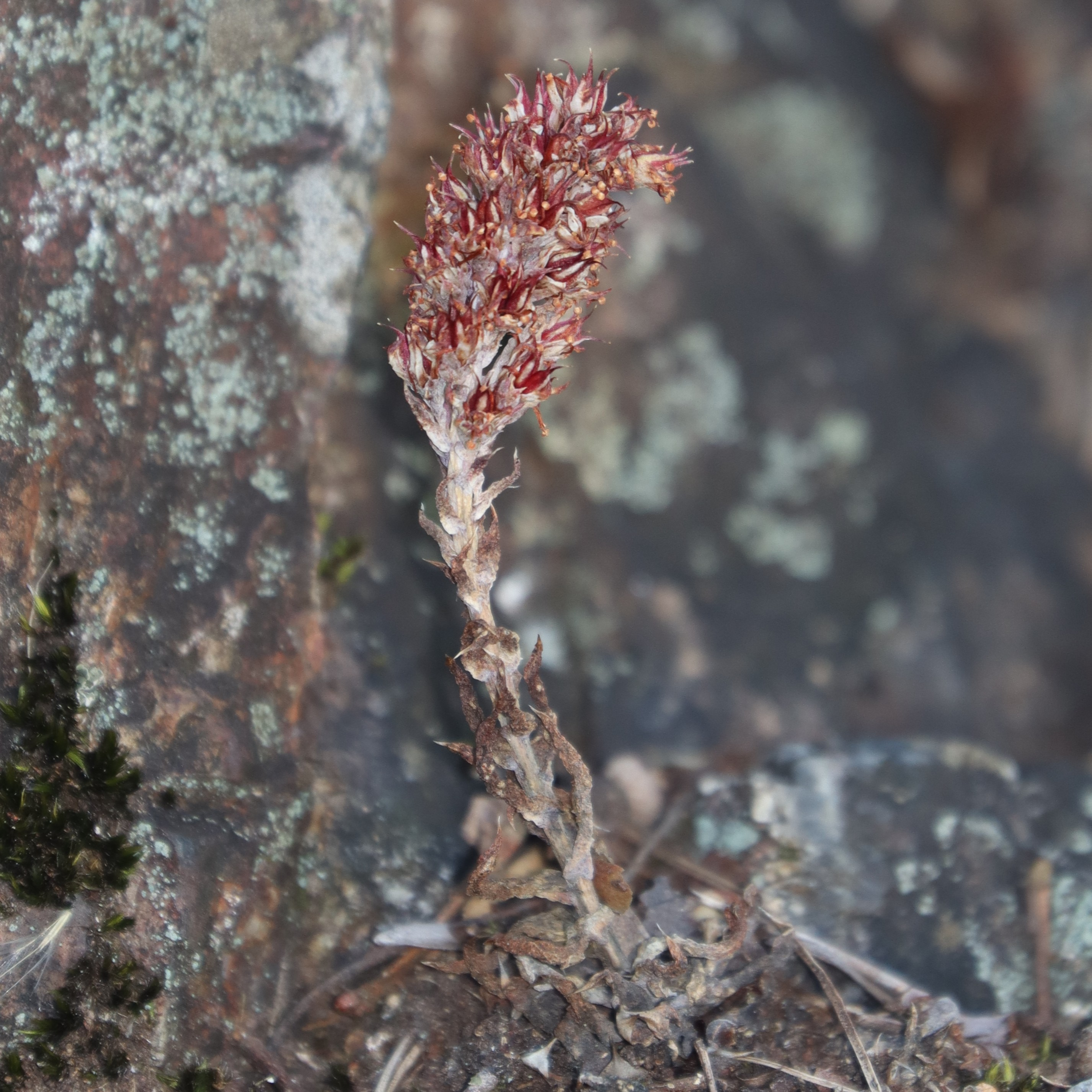
Fruit, it dries out

== Medicinal uses ==
The leaves and stems contain several medically active constituents including fatty acid esters, Friedelin and flavonoids. They are antispasmodic and cytotoxic. It has anti-cancer effects in vitro. In Korea, they are used in the treatment of cancer, gingivitis, coagulation and metritis.
