= Vinylcyclohexene dioxide =

Names
- IUPAC name 3-Oxiranyl-7-oxabicyclo[4.1.0]heptane
- Other names 1,2-Epoxy-4-(epoxyethyl)cyclohexane; 4-Vinylcyclohexene diepoxide

Identifiers
CAS Number	106-87-6
3D model (JSmol)	Interactive image
Abbreviations	VCD
ChEBI	CHEBI:59001
ChEMBL	ChEMBL1734307
ChemSpider	7545
ECHA InfoCard	100.003.126
EC Number	203-437-7
KEGG	C19311
PubChem CID	7833
RTECS number	RN8640000
UNII	596C064IG4
UN number	2810 (1-VINYL-3-CYCLOHEXENE DIOXIDE)
CompTox Dashboard (EPA)	DTXSID0020604
- InChI: InChI=1S/C8H12O2/c1-2-6-7(10-6)3-5(1)8-4-9-8/h5-8H,1-4H2 Key: OECTYKWYRCHAKR-UHFFFAOYSA-N
- SMILES: C1CC2C(O2)CC1C3CO3

Properties
Chemical formula	C_{8}H_{12}O_{2}
Molar mass	140.182 g·mol^{−1}
Appearance	Colorless liquid
Density	1.09 g·cm^{−3}
Melting point	−108.9 °C (−164.0 °F; 164.2 K)
Boiling point	227 °C (441 °F; 500 K)
Vapor pressure	13 Pa (20 °C)

Hazards
- Occupational safety and health (OHS/OSH)
Main hazards	Toxic
- GHS labelling
Pictograms	(GHS06: Toxic) (GHS08: Health hazard)
Signal word	Danger
Hazard statements	H302, H331, H341, H350, H360F
Precautionary statements	P203, P261, P264, P270, P271, P280, P301+P317, P304+P340, P316, P318, P321, P330, P403+P233, P405, P501
- Except where otherwise noted, data are given for materials in their standard state (at 25 °C [77 °F], 100 kPa). Infobox references

4-Vinylcyclohexene dioxide (VCD) is an organic compound that contains two epoxide functional groups. It is industrially used as a crosslinking agent for the production of epoxy resins. It is a colourless liquid. It is an intermediate for synthesis of organic compounds.

== Preparation and properties ==
4-Vinylcyclohexene dioxide is prepared by epoxidation of 4-vinylcyclohexene with peroxybenzoic acid. Its viscosity is 15 mPa·s.

== Safety ==
4-Vinylcyclohexene dioxide, like other volatile epoxides, is classified as an alkylating agent. VCD has toxic effects on fertility. It is a killer of oocytes, eggs in a female's ovaries, in immature ovarian follicles in mice and rats.

In pest control, it has been used as an ovotoxic agent for reducing rat fertility.
