= Celastrol =

Names
- IUPAC name 3-Hydroxy-9β,13α-dimethyl-2-oxo-24,25,26-trinoroleana-1(10),3,5,7-tetraen-29-oic acid
- Systematic IUPAC name (2R,4aS,6aS,12bR,14aS,14bR)-10-Hydroxy-2,4a,6a,9,12b,14a-hexamethyl-11-oxo-1,2,3,4,4a,5,6,6a,11,12b,13,14,14a,14b-tetradecahydropicene-2-carboxylic acid
- Other names Tripterine

Identifiers
CAS Number	34157-83-0
3D model (JSmol)	Interactive image
ChemSpider	109405
ECHA InfoCard	100.164.266
PubChem CID	122724
UNII	L8GG98663L
CompTox Dashboard (EPA)	DTXSID2040993
- InChI: InChI=1S/C29H38O4/c1-17-18-7-8-21-27(4,19(18)15-20(30)23(17)31)12-14-29(6)22-16-26(3,24(32)33)10-9-25(22,2)11-13-28(21,29)5/h7-8,15,22,31H,9-14,16H2,1-6H3,(H,32,33)/t22-,25-,26-,27+,28-,29+/m1/s1 Key: KQJSQWZMSAGSHN-JJWQIEBTSA-N; InChI=1/C29H38O4/c1-17-18-7-8-21-27(4,19(18)15-20(30)23(17)31)12-14-29(6)22-16-26(3,24(32)33)10-9-25(22,2)11-13-28(21,29)5/h7-8,15,22,31H,9-14,16H2,1-6H3,(H,32,33)/t22-,25-,26-,27+,28-,29+/m1/s1 Key: KQJSQWZMSAGSHN-JJWQIEBTBS
- SMILES: CC1=C(C(=O)C=C2C1=CC=C3[C@]2(CC[C@@]4([C@@]3(CC[C@@]5([C@H]4C[C@](CC5)(C)C(=O)O)C)C)C)C)O

Properties
Chemical formula	C_{29}H_{38}O_{4}
Molar mass	450.619 g·mol^{−1}
Appearance	Crystalline solid
Melting point	213 °C (415 °F; 486 K)
- Except where otherwise noted, data are given for materials in their standard state (at 25 °C [77 °F], 100 kPa). Infobox references

Celastrol (tripterine) is a bioactive chemical compound isolated from the roots of Tripterygium wilfordii (Thunder duke vine) and Tripterygium regelii (Regel's threewingnut). Celastrol is a pentacyclic nortriterpen quinone and belongs to the family of quinone methides. It has been used for centuries as a traditional Chinese medicine. In recent years, celastrol has been widely studied for its anti-inflammatory, anticancer, antioxidant, and antibacterial properties.

In mice, celastrol is an NR4A1 agonist that alleviates inflammation and induces autophagy. It also influences metabolic regulation by enhancing IL1R1 expression, which is the receptor for the cytokine interleukin-1 (IL-1). IL1R1 knock-out mice exposed to celastrol exhibit no leptin-sensitizing or anti-obesity effect.

In in vitro and in vivo animal experiments, celastrol exhibits antibacterial, antioxidant, anti-inflammatory, anticancer, and insecticidal properties. It has been shown to have obesity-controlling effects in mice by inhibiting negative regulators of leptin. Celastrol has also shown to possess anti-diabetic effects on diabetic nephropathy and improve whole-body insulin resistance, through the inhibition of NF-κB signaling in the hypothalamus.

Celastrol inhibits the IKK-NF-κB signaling pathway via multiple molecular mechanisms, including the direct inhibition of IKKα and IKKβ kinases, inactivation of CDC37 and p23 (HSP90 chaperone proteins), suppression of proteasome function and activation of HSF1, which triggers the heat shock response. The available evidence indicates that celastrol covalently binds to the thiol groups of cysteine residues within its molecular targets.

Celastrol also has demonstrated in vitro inhibitory effects against the carbapenemase of carbapenem-resistant Klebsiella pneumoniae (CRE), particularly when used in combination with thymol, a monoterpene.

== Antibacterial activity against MRSA ==
Recent studies have identified celastrol as a potential antibacterial agent against methicillin-resistant Staphylococcus aureus (MRSA). Multi-omics analysis suggests that celastrol targets bacterial Δ¹-pyrroline-5-carboxylate dehydrogenase (P5CDH), which is an enzyme involved in proline metabolism. Molecular docking identified Lys205 and Glu208 as critical binding sites for celastrol on P5CDH.

By binding to P5CDH, celastrol disrupts its function and leads to an accumulation of Δ1-pyrroline-5-carboxylate (P5C). This disruption interferes with bacterial oxidative stress regulation, resulting in an increase in reactive oxygen species (ROS) and oxidative damage. Additionally, the inhibition of P5CDH disrupts bacterial energy production and DNA synthesis, ultimately leading to bacterial cell death. Because celastrol affects multiple bacterial metabolic pathways, it is a promising candidate for drug development.

Experiments in vitro demonstrated that celastrol exhibits significant antibacterial activity against Gram-positive bacteria, including multiple MRSA strains. However, it is significantly less effective against Gram-negative bacteria due to structural differences in their cell wall structures. The compound also demonstrated low levels of resistance development compared to traditional antibiotics such as vancomycin and oxacillin.

In vivo studies using Galleria mellonella larvae and murine infection models showed that celastrol effectively reduced bacterial burden and improved survival rates in MRSA-infected animals. However, high doses of celastrol led to toxicity, including hepatotoxicity and renal damage. Additionally, celastrol's therapeutic window is narrow, meaning that only a specific dosage range is effective. It was also shown that in high concentrations, celastrol induces apoptosis in spleen cells. These findings suggest that celastrol may not be suitable for direct clinical use. On the other hand, celastrol should be used as a lead compound for developing safer and more effective derivatives.
