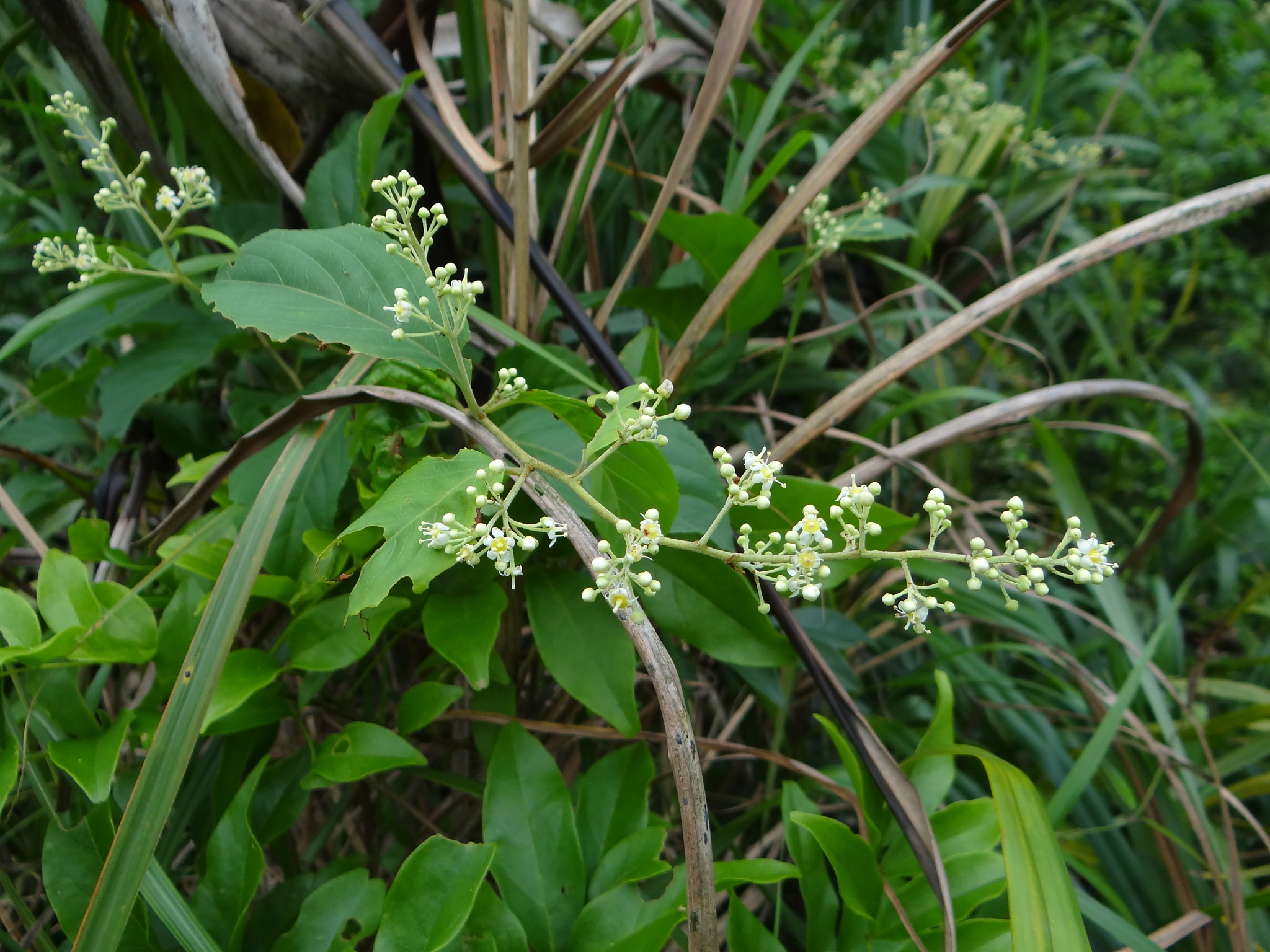

Scientific classification
- Kingdom: Plantae
- Clade: Embryophytes
- Clade: Tracheophytes
- Clade: Angiosperms
- Clade: Eudicots
- Clade: Rosids
- Order: Celastrales
- Family: Celastraceae
- Genus: Tripterygium
- Species: T. wilfordii

Binomial name
- Tripterygium wilfordii Hook.f.

= Tripterygium wilfordii =

Species of flowering plant

Tripterygium wilfordii, or léi gōng téng (Mandarin) (Chinese: 雷公藤, Japanese: raikōtō), sometimes called thunder god vine but more properly translated thunder duke vine, is a vine used in traditional Chinese medicine.

Tripterygium wilfordii has been promoted for use in rheumatoid arthritis and psoriasis; however, due to safety concerns this use is not recommended. Evidence is insufficient to deem it effective as a method of birth control for humans. Extracts of the bark T. wilfordii have been used as an insecticide in China for centuries, as documented in Wu Qijun's 1848 Illustrated Catalogues of Plants.

== Health effects ==
The United Kingdom government does not recommend the use of Tripterygium due to potential side effects.

=== Birth control ===
Evidence is lacking that Tripterygium is either safe or effective as a method of birth control in men. Two trials found less sperm in people taking it for rheumatoid arthritis but these trials were observational in nature. A 2021 study in the journal Nature Communications found that triptonide, a chemical isolated from Tripterygium, was an effective birth control for male mice and male cynomolgus monkeys, but noted that other chemicals present in the plant cause severe toxicity, so consuming the herb or general extracts of the herb for birth control purposes is potentially dangerous.

=== Rheumatoid arthritis ===
In China, T. wilfordii has historically been used as a treatment of rheumatoid arthritis (RA). The National Center for Complementary and Integrative Health has noted tentative evidence that T. wilfordii may improve some RA symptoms. Serious side effects, however, occur frequently enough to make the risks of taking it higher than the possible benefits.

=== Other bioactive chemicals ===
Wilfortrine is a sesquiterpene alkaloid isolated from T. wilfordii. It has immunomodulatory effects.

== Side effects ==
At medicinal doses, T. wilfordii extract can have significant side effects, including immunosuppression.

In August 2011, the UK Medicines and Healthcare products Regulatory Agency published a drug safety bulletin advising consumers not to use medicines containing lei gong teng due to potentially serious side effects.

China State Food and Drug Administration issued a warning in April 2012 about this medicine, urging caution.

A 2016 review found gastrointestinal symptoms in 13%, adverse reproductive outcomes in 12%, adverse skin reactions in 8%, hematologic events in 6.5%, cardiovascular events in 5%. Also irregular menstruation OR=4.6.

A 2011 review stated that although T. wilfordii has toxic potential, careful extraction gives an acceptable frequency of adverse reactions, which are largely related to the gastrointestinal tract and amenorrhea. The review found that T. wilfordii extract is a useful remedy for postmenopausal rheumatoid arthritis.

== Pharmacology ==
Chemical structure of triptolide

Celastrol, a pentacyclic triterpenoid, and triptolide, a diterpene triepoxide, are putative active components of the extracts derived from Tripterygium wilfordii. Triptolide has pharmacological activities including anti-inflammatory, immune modulation, antiproliferative, and proapoptotic activity, but its clinical use is limited by severe toxicity. The biological target of triptolide is believed to be the XPB subunit of the TFIIH protein complex (involved in DNA repair and transcription initiation).

Tripfordines are bio-active sesquiterpene pyridine alkaloids of T. wilfordii.

The genome of the species has been sequenced to study biosynthetic pathways. A 2020 article reported the genome of T. wilfordi to study the triptolide biosynthetic pathway. In addition, to aid the investigation of pathways related to celastrol, a reference genome of T. wilfordii was sequenced, producing a 340.12 Mb genome with 31,593 structural genes (35 of them, CYP genes involved in the synthesis of the alkaloid active ingredients).
