= KO-8,2 (hunting rifle) =

- Type: bolt-action rifle
- Place of origin: USSR

Production history
- Designer: D. M. Kochetov
- Designed: 1931
- Manufacturer: Tula Arms Plant; Izhevsk Machine-Building Plant
- Produced: 1932 - 1941; 1946 - 1965

Specifications
- Mass: 3.6 kg (KO-8,2); 3.0 kg (KO-8,2M)
- Length: 1020 (KO-8,2); 1000 mm (KO-8,2M)
- Barrel length: 500mm - 520mm
- Cartridge: 8.2×66mmR; 9×53mmR (KO-9)
- Rate of fire: variable
- Feed system: 5-round magazine, loaded individually
- Sights: iron sights optical sight (KO-8,2M)

The KO-8,2 is a Soviet bolt-action hunting rifle based on 7.62mm M1891/30 military rifle.

== History ==
In the early 1930s, it was decided to develop a large-caliber hunting cartridge with an expanding bullet and a hunting rifle for this cartridge based on the design of well-known standard military rifle. In 1932, Tula Arms Plant began serial production of the NK-8,2 mm hunting carbine, which lasted until 1941.

After the end of World War II, production continued, with the weapon being renamed KO-8,2.

After start of the serial production of new hunting rifles (Bars, Los and Medved), the production of KO-8,2 hunting carbines and 8.2×66mm cartridges for them was discontinued.

== Design ==
The NK-8,2 (KO-8,2) hunting rifle is a standard M1891/30 military rifle without bayonet with a new 8.2mm barrel and new bolt.

The NK-8,2 (KO-8,2) hunting rifle had a birch stock and fore-end.

A small number of rifles were equipped with detachable folding bipod.

== Variants ==
- NK-8,2 (НК-8,2) - first model, pre-war production, made by Tula Arms Plant
- KO-8,2 (КО-8,2) - first model, post-war production (renamed without changes in design)
- KO-8,2M (КО-8,2М) - second model, since August 1961. It has new 500mm barrel with four right grooves (320mm twist rate), new wooden gunstock and detachable scope base for optical sight ТО-4
- KO-9 (КО-9) - third model (9mm version of KO-8,2M for 9×53mmR ammunition). It had new 600mm barrel with muzzle brake, different wooden gunstock with recoil pad and detachable scope base for optical sight, one test prototype was built

Also, in 2005, the Vyatskiye Polyany Machine-Building Plant announced that it would begin production of new VPO-103 (ВПО-103) hunting carbine (a surplus 7.62mm M1944 military carbine converted to fire 9×53mmR ammunition).

== Users ==
- Soviet Union – was allowed as civilian hunting weapon
- Mongolia - at least several NK-8,2 rifles were sold to Mongolia as civilian hunting weapon

== Museum exhibits ==
- ten rifles are in collection of Tula State Arms Museum in Tula Kremlin

== Sources ==
- А. Я. Зеленков. Универсальное охотничье ружье для промысловой охоты // Рационализация охотничьего промысла. Выпуск 4. М., Заготиздат, 1955. ("Библиотека промыслового охотника")
- В. Н. Трофимов. Отечественные охотничьи ружья нарезные. М., ДАИРС, 2007. стр.106-109
