= Bars (hunting rifle) =

- Type: Bolt-action rifle
- Place of origin: USSR

Production history
- Designer: A. I. Nesterov
- Manufacturer: Izhevsk Machine-Building Plant
- Produced: Since 1960s

Specifications
- Mass: 3.0 kg (6.6 lb)
- Length: 1,030 mm (41 in)
- Barrel length: 600 mm (24 in)
- Cartridge: 5.6×39mm 7.62×39mm.223 Remington
- Rate of fire: Variable
- Feed system: 5-round magazine, loaded individually
- Sights: Iron sights Optical sight

The Bars (Russian: Барс, lit. 'Snow leopard') is a Soviet and Russian bolt-action hunting rifle.

== History ==
"Bars" was designed in the early 1960s.

In May 1965, the price of one standard rifle was between 120 and 140 roubles.

In 1967, "Bars" was awarded the golden medal of the Leipzig Trade Fair and Izhevsk Machine-Building Plant began its serial production in large numbers.

In 1993, Kazan Optical-Mechanical Plant began production of night-vision device for "Bars", "Los-4" and "Los-7" hunting rifles.

In the 2000s, Zagorsk Optical-Mechanical Plant began production of PKO-2 (ПКО-2) reflector sight for "Bars-4" hunting rifles.

In 2017, Kalashnikov Concern announced its intention to replace the production of "Bars" hunting rifles and previous models of "Los" hunting rifles with a new model (Baikal 145 "Los"). In June 2018, the start of its production was announced and production of "Bars" hunting rifles was discontinued.

== Design ==
The barrel is chrome-plated.

The "Bars" has staggered column detachable box magazine.

It has manual safety switch

All variants of "Bars" rifles have iron sights, and they were equipped with scope base for optical sight.

- PO-4×34 (ПО-4×34) and TO-4 scopes were standard optical sights, although custom aftermarket variants are known.

"Bars-223" was equipped with PO-4×24 (ПО-4×24) scope made by Novosibirsk Instrument-Building Plant.

== Variants ==
- "Bars-1" (КО-5,6–60 «Барс-1») – first model, 5.6×39mm. Its barrel has six grooves
- "Bars-4" («Барс-4») – second model, 5.6×39mm and 7.62×39mm, since 1985
- "Bars-4-1" («Барс-4-1») – since 1990s, 5.6×39mm and 7.62×39mm
- "Bars-223" («Барс-223») – "Bars-4-1" chambered in .223 Remington, it was designed in early 2000s, in 2001 – 2002 small number were made, in January 2003 its serial production was announced.

== Users ==
- Soviet Union – was allowed as civilian hunting weapon
- Belarus - is allowed as civilian hunting weapon
- Kazakhstan
- Moldova - is allowed as civilian hunting weapon
- Russian Federation – is allowed as civilian hunting weapon
- Ukraine – is allowed as civilian hunting weapon
- USA - the import was allowed

== Museum exhibits ==
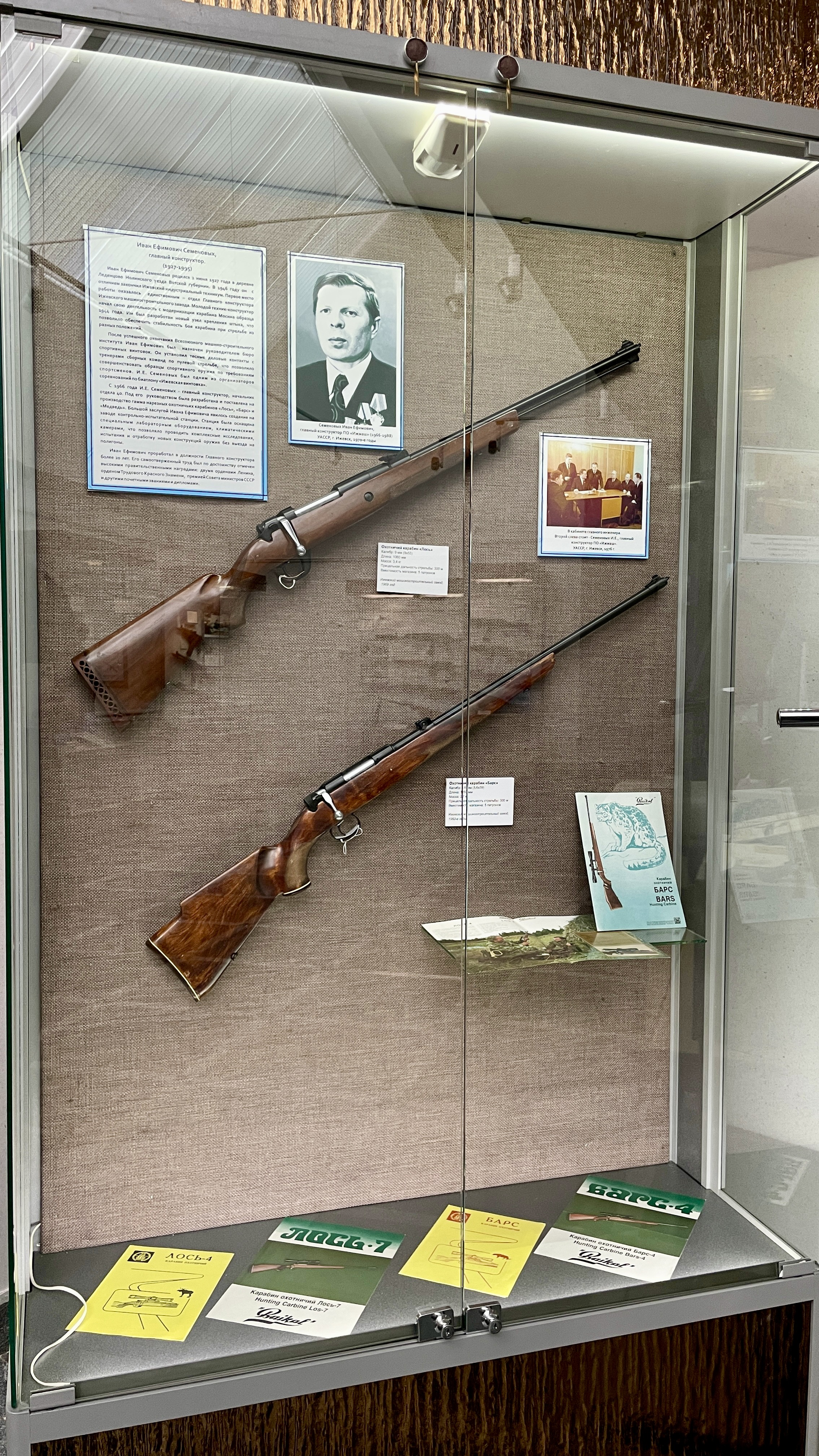
A "Bars" hunting rifle in the collection of M. T. Kalashnikov Museum in Izhevsk

- one "Bars" hunting rifle is in the collection of M. T. Kalashnikov Museum in Izhevsk

== Sources ==
- Охотничий карабин "Барс-1" // Спортивно-охотничье оружие и патроны. Бухарест, "Внешторгиздат", 1965. стр.44-45
- Е. В. Кудрявцев. Охота (краткий справочник). 3-е изд., доп. М., Агропромиздат, 1985. стр.17
- Карабин малокалиберный магазинный "Барс" // Охотничье и спортивное оружие, патроны. М., Внешторгиздат, 1989.
- журнал «Оружие», № 2, 1997.
- Виктор Рон. Ижевский "Барс" // журнал "Оружие", № 5, 2017. стр.63–64 – ISSN 1728-9203
