= MTs 7 =

Soviet/Russian shotgun

- Type: double barreled shotgun
- Place of origin: USSR

Production history
- Manufacturer: TsKIB SOO
- Produced: since late 1950s

Specifications
- Mass: 2.6 - 5.0 kg
- Barrel length: 600mm - 750mm
- Caliber: 12, 20 gauge 7.62×54mmR; 9×53mmR
- Action: Break action
- Rate of fire: variable
- Sights: iron sights optical sight

The MTs 7 (МЦ 7) is a family of Soviet and Russian double-barreled high-quality custom hunting shotguns, combination guns and rifles.

== History ==
The first version of MTs 7 (MTs 7-1) was designed in late 1950s by TsKIB SOO as target rifle for competition shooting, although later it was redesigned and since 1960 it was sold as high-quality hunting weapon.

MTs 7 custom guns were among the most expensive of all hunting firearms made in USSR.

- In August 1981, the price of one custom MTs 7 smoothbore shotgun was 1,000 roubles and the price of one custom MTs 7 double-barreled rifle was 1,200 roubles
- In December 1987, the price of one custom MTs7-20 shotgun was 1,500 roubles, the price of one MTs7-12 shotgun was 1,700 roubles, the price of one MTs7-07 or MTs7-09 rifle was 1,800 roubles.

In 1990s it was announced that new MTs 7-17 combination gun will be made. However, due to the economic crisis in the Russian Federation, production of all versions of MTs 7 was greatly reduced.

== Design ==
MTs 7 is an over and under hammerless gun, with one barrel above the other. The barrels are detachable.

It is equipped with safety mechanism and ejector.

All guns have a walnut shoulder stock (with or without cheekpiece) and fore-end, some of them were decorated with engravings.

MTs 7 hunting rifles and combination guns can be equipped with optical sight PO-4×34 (ПО-4×34) made by Zagorsk Optical-Mechanical Plant.

== Variants ==
- MTs 7-1 (МЦ 7-1) - first model, 6.5mm target rifle with 750mm barrels and diopter sight (4 - 5 kg)
- MTs 7-01 (МЦ 7-01) - second model, 6.5mm hunting rifle with 600mm barrels (3.25 - 3.75 kg)
- MTs 7-02 (МЦ 7-02) - third model, 7.62×54mmR hunting rifle with 600mm barrels (3.5 - 4.0 kg)
- MTs 7-07 (МЦ 7-07) - 7.62×51mm hunting rifle with 600mm barrels
- MTs 7-09 (МЦ 7-09) - 9×53mmR double-barreled hunting rifle with 600mm barrels (3.4 - 3.6 kg). This model has been produced since 1968. It was equipped with PO-4-1 (ПО-4-1) optical sight and rubber recoil pad on its shoulder stock
- MTs 7-12 (МЦ 7-12) - a 12/70 smoothbore double-barreled hunting shotgun with 750mm barrels (3.0 - 3.3 kg)

- MTs 7-12S (МЦ 7-12С) - a version of MTs 7-12 shotgun with new trigger mechanism

- MTs 7-17 (МЦ 7-17) - a combination gun (12 gauge smoothbore barrel and 7.62×54mmR rifled barrel)
- MTs 7-20 (МЦ 7-20) - a 20/70 smoothbore double-barreled hunting shotgun with 675mm barrels (2.6 - 2.9 kg)

== Sources ==
- Охотничье двуствольное ружьё МЦ 7 // Охотничье, спортивное огнестрельное оружие. Каталог. М., 1958. стр.26-27
- Э. В. Штейнгольд. Всё об охотничьем ружье. 2-е изд., испр. и доп. М., «Лесная промышленность», 1978.
- М. М. Блюм, И. Б. Шишкин. Охотничье ружьё. М., «Лесная промышленность», 1983. стр.89-90
- МЦ 7 // Д. М. Закутский, В. А. Лесников, В. В. Филиппов. Охотничье огнестрельное оружие отечественного производства (1968 - 1986 гг.): учебное пособие. М., ВНИИ МВД СССР, 1988. стр.29-31, 34-35
- М. М. Блюм, И. Б. Шишкин. Твоё ружьё. М., "Физкультура и спорт", 1989. стр.78
- Ружьё двуствольное МЦ 7 // Охотничье и спортивное оружие. М., Внешторгиздат. 1989.
- Виктор Рон. МЦ 7-12С: надёжность и универсальность // журнал "Оружие", No. 12, 2018. стр.63-64 - ISSN 1728-9203
