= Evgeny Chubarov =

Russian artist (1934–2012)

- Born: December 11, 1934
- Died: December 5, 2012 (aged 77)
- Known for: Painting; Graphic art; Sculpture
- Movement: Abstract expressionism
- Awards: Pollock-Krasner Foundation
- Patrons: Gary Tatintsian
- Website: https://chubarov.art

Evgeny Iosifovich Chubarov (Russian: Евгений Иосифович Чубаров; 11 December 1934 – 5 December 2012) was a painter, sculptor, and graphic artist.

== Early life ==
Evgeny Chubarov was born in the village of Yemashi in Bashkiria on 11 December 1934. Chubarov's father Yosif Grigoryevich Chubarov, 1910 -1943, and his mother Anastasya Pavlovna Lyashkova, 1916-1998, were Orthodox Russians.

== Career ==
=== 1950s–60s ===
In 1959, Chubarov went to Saratov and then to Zagorsk (now Sergiev Posad), where he worked at the restoration studio of the sculptor Dmitry Tsaplin. In 1961, he married Lyudmila Gukovich, a pediatrician who worked in Istra. They lived in rented rooms that they had found by chance.

In 1963, his paintings March and Factory Landscape (views of the Zagorsk Optical and Mechanical Plant) appeared at an exhibition of young artists in Moscow. Factory Landscape was published in Iskusstvo magazine just a few months after Nikita Khrushchev, the First Secretary of the Central Committee of the Communist Party of the Soviet Union, had criticized artists who were focused on the European avant-garde.

During these years, Chubarov conceived a passion for creating wooden sculpture. He got the material he needed thanks to useful contacts with an engineer from a brick factory in Zagorsk. According to his wife's memoirs, the works were life-size portraits that resembled photos of the victims of Auschwitz.

The paintings and graphics of the 60s clearly show Chubarov's interest in Eros, both physical and psychological. An example is the 1969 canvas where a woman sits on a man's lap. The man's head is a dark green square with carelessly scribbled eyes and a mouth. The treatment of male characters as geometric shadows can be found in other works of that period. Chubarov understood the male as an impersonal work in progress. It is the basic stage of production of subconscious impulses.

=== 1970s–80s ===
In the 1970s and 1980s, Chubarov moved from simple compositions towards a new interpretation of the relationship between painting and the body. He created his famous series of powerful multi-figure ink compositions on paper. Compositionally, his work inherits Christ Carrying the Cross by Bosch (1515–1516), the expressionism of Boris Grigoriev in his Faces of Russia (1920–30s) and Pavel Filonov’s analytical experiments. If Chubarov had previously painted some characters in easily readable relations, in the 70s and 80s, he created situations with maximum tightness and filled the canvas with more and more faces and bodies that were rarely bound by a common storyline.

In Fight (1982), Chubarov equates the surface of the canvas to the body and skin, erasing the border between the figurative and the body. Later, that understanding of the surface of the canvas propelled him to the ultimate objectlessness. The motives of Fight would remain throughout the artist’s period of pure abstraction and would move into many of his drawings.

Other paintings of the 1980s are full of references to hidden and demonstrative sexuality—from the image of a gravedigger to characters with chopped-off limbs or signs of rigor mortis on their faces.

For several decades, Chubarov had been working on a series of stone sculptures. At the Sculpture Park in Moscow, there is a composition consisting of 283 stone heads. The heads form a separate wall covered with bars; the structure, as well as the meaning of the work—a monument to victims of Stalinist repression—did not originate with the artist. It was created by the park administration, which accepted these sculptures as a gift in the mid-1990s.

In 1986, Chubarov was admitted to the Union of Artists.

=== Years abroad ===
The Soviet part of Chubarov’s biography is not so rich in external events, and there is no evidence that the artist tried to become part of the underground. His name did not appear on the list of those artists who tried to exhibit independently.

At the invitation of art dealer Gary Tatintsian, he traveled to Berlin and New York City, where his style underwent its last transformation. Chubarov moved from impressionism to pure abstraction and succeeded. He was awarded a Pollock-Krasner Foundation grant and participated in exhibitions on equal footing with the greatest artists of the post-war generation. Chubarov came to abstraction at the moment when it stopped being a political gesture of emancipation from the formal requirements of art. Such a late step beyond the narrative art emphasizes his internal independence from the artistic context he had to work in. Chubarov managed to concentrate on the painstaking creation of non-figurative painting primarily as a thing, an object in different dimensions, from the ornamental to the psychological. Chubarov considered himself an heir of the Russian "archaic" culture, drawing a parallel between his technique and the ideas of Malevich's Black Square. Working in his unique style, along with the iconic representatives of the Soviet art, such as Ilya Kabakov, Andrey Monastyrsky and Erik Bulatov, Chubarov embodied in his paintings the idea of a new era’s philosophy, visually identifying energy of the world around him, and transforming abstract symbols into images of reflection displaced in the conceptual art energy.

=== 1990s ===
Starting in the early 1990s, Chubarov's main task in painting became a transition to abstract painting at several levels, deprived of "dark passion". On the contrary, compared to the works of his Soviet period, his painting at this time was optimistic . Previous experience in painting anarchic corporality during the 1970s and 1980s allowed Chubarov to abandon self-revealing symbols. The artist refused close contact with the canvas, which is characteristic of abstract expressionism and which transforms into the fixation on a gesture, as in Pollock’s works, or into speculative space of pure color, as in Rothko’s paintings. Chubarov created paintings to be seen both closely and from a distance.

Chubarov and his wife came back to Moscow at the end of the 90s. They settled in an apartment in Mytishchi, visited by many key figures in nonconformist and official culture, including Ernst Neizvestny and Ilya Kabakov.

=== Evgeny Chubarov Foundation ===
Evgeny Chubarov Foundation was established after artist’s death in 2013.

The Foundation is dedicated to present artist’s legacy and foster an understanding of his life and creative achievements through the preservation of the foundation’s art collections and archives.

== Exhibitions ==
Chubarov's monumental works were exhibited at well-known venues in Europe and the United States, and later in Russia. At group exhibitions, Chubarov's works were exhibited together with the paintings of classic artists of the twentieth century—Mel Bochner, Frank Stella, Sol LeWitt, Damien Hirst, Peter Halley and Stephan Balkenhol. A series of multi-figure compositions was included in the permanent exhibition at the State Tretyakov Gallery.

In 2015, the Gary Tatintsian Gallery held a memorial show devoted to the artist's 80th anniversary.

In August 2016, a personal exhibition, "The Berlin Works" by Evgeny Chubarov, opened at Osthaus-Museum Hagen in Germany.

=== Solo exhibitions ===
- 2016 – "The Berlin Works". Osthaus-Museum Hagen, Hagen, Germany.
- 2015 – Gary Tatintsian Gallery, Moscow, Russia
- 2014 – 80th anniversary of Evgeny Chubarov. National Centre for Contemporary Arts, Moscow, Russia.
- 2007 – Gary Tatintsian Gallery, Moscow, Russia
- 2007 – "The E. Chubarov". S'ART Gallery, Moscow, Russia
- 2004 – "Return to the Abstract". The State Russian Museum, St.Petersburg, Russia
- 2004 – "Return to the Abstract". National Center for Contemporary Arts, Moscow, Russia
- 2003 – E. Chubarov. Gary Tatintsian Gallery, New York, US
- 2001 – E. Chubarov. Gary Tatintsian Gallery, New York, US
- 1998 – "Victims of Stalinism". Park of the Arts Muzeon and Sakharov Center, Moscow, Russia
- 1996 – Andreas Weiss Galerie, Berlin, Germany
- 1993 – International Art Fair for East European Art. Hamburg, Germany
- 1990 – Galerie Vier, Berlin, Germany
- 1989 – Tatunz Galerie, Berlin, Germany
- 1988 – "Homecoming". The House of Sculpture, Moscow, USSR
- 1987 – "Toward the Scythians". Hermitage Association, Moscow, USSR

=== Group exhibitions ===
- 2009 — "Price Of Oil". Gary Tatintsian Gallery, Moscow, Russia
- 2007 — "Create Your Own Museum". Gary Tatintsian Gallery, Moscow, Russia
- 2003 — Kazimir Malevich's Birthday. Art Center DOM, Moscow
- 2002 — Rejoinders. Art Center DOM, Moscow
- 1999 — Sol LeWitt, Mel Bochner, Evgeny Chubarov. Gary Tatintsian Gallery, New York, USA
- 1998 — Galerie Bayer, Stuttgart, Germany
- 1989 — Paradoxes Of The Corporeal. Municipal Gallery A-3, Moscow Dialogue: Russian and Modern Times. Boris Vian Center, France
- 2001 — Evgeny Chubarov. Gary Tatintsian Gallery, New York, USA
- 1988 — Picture As Object. The House of Artist on Kuznetsky Most, Moscow, Russia
- 1987 — The Artist and Modern Times. Exhibition Hall in Kashirskoye shosse, Moscow
- 1986 — Holiday Culture. Eshibition Hall in Kashirskoye Shosse, Moscow
- 1985 — The Mythology Of Environment. Exhibition Hall in Kashirskoye Shosse, Moscow
- 1962 — Emerging Artists. The State A.S. Pushkin Art Museum, Moscow

== Selected public collections ==
- Pushkin Museum, Moscow, Russia
- Tretyakov Gallery, Moscow, Russia
- Rutgers University Museum, New Jersey, NY, USA
- Moscow Museum of Modern Art, Moscow, Russia
- Muzeon Park of Arts, Moscow, Russia

== Literature ==
- Dyakonov V. About Evgeny Chubarov.
- Evgeny Chubarov. Osthaus Museum Hagen. Catalogue, 2016
- Evgeny Chubarov. Catalogue, 2015
- Evgeny Chubarov. Catalogue, 2004
