= MTs 110 =

Soviet/Russian shotgun

- Type: double barreled shotgun
- Place of origin: USSR

Production history
- Manufacturer: TsKIB SOO

Specifications
- Mass: 2.7 - 3.6 kg
- Barrel length: 600mm - 750mm
- Caliber: 12, 20 gauge 7.62×51mm 9×53mmR
- Action: Break action
- Rate of fire: variable
- Sights: iron sights optical sight

The MTs 110 (МЦ 110) is a family of Soviet and Russian double-barreled high-quality custom hunting shotguns and rifles.

== History ==
MTs 110 was designed by TsKIB SOO and was produced in small numbers.

In 1976, MTs 110-12 shotgun was awarded the golden medal of the Zagreb Fair. It was offered for export to other countries.

In December 1987, the price of one custom MTs 110 shotgun was 1,300 roubles, the price of one MTs 110-07 or MTs 110-09 rifle was 1,500 roubles.

== Design ==
MTs 110 is a side by side hammerless gun with detachable barrels.

It is equipped with safety mechanism and ejector.

All guns have a walnut shoulder stock (with or without cheekpiece) and fore-end, some of them were decorated with engravings.

MTs 110 hunting rifles can be equipped with optical sight PO-4×34 (ПО-4×34) made by Zagorsk Optical-Mechanical Plant.

== Variants ==
- MTs 110-07 (МЦ 110-07) - 7.62×51mm hunting rifle with 600mm barrels (3.6 kg)
- MTs 110-09 (МЦ 110-09) - 9×53mmR double-barreled hunting rifle with 600mm barrels (6 right grooves), 3.6 kg
- MTs 110-12 (МЦ 110-12) - a 12/70 smoothbore double-barreled hunting shotgun with 750mm barrels (3.1 - 3.3 kg)
- MTs 110-20 (МЦ 110-20) - a 20/70 smoothbore double-barreled hunting shotgun with 675mm barrels (2.7 - 2.9 kg)

== Users ==
- Soviet Union
- Moldova - MTs 110-12 smoothbore shotguns are allowed as civilian hunting weapon
- Russian Federation - since August 1996, only MTs 110-12 smoothbore shotguns are allowed as civilian hunting weapon

== Sources ==
- М. М. Блюм, И. Б. Шишкин. Охотничье ружьё. М., «Лесная промышленность», 1983. стр.91-92
- М. М. Блюм, И. Б. Шишкин. Твоё ружьё. М., "Физкультура и спорт", 1989. стр.71-72
- МЦ 110-07 и МЦ 110-09 // В. Н. Трофимов. Отечественные охотничьи ружья нарезные. М., ДАИРС, 2007. стр.286
