= AEK-999 =

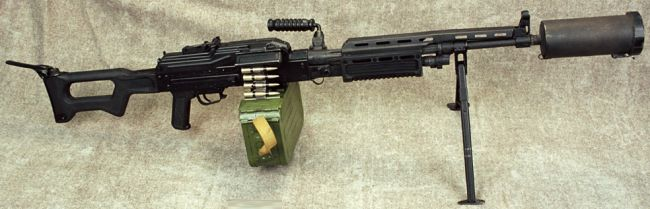
- AEK-999 on display with a bipod and suppressor
- Type: General purpose machine gun
- Place of origin: Russia

Service history
- In service: 2008-present
- Wars: Russo-Georgian War; Syrian Civil War

Production history
- Manufacturer: Kovrov Mechanical Plant

Specifications
- Mass: 8.74 kg (19.27 lb)
- Length: 1188 mm
- Barrel length: 605 mm
- Shell: 7.62×54mmR
- Calibre: 7.62mm
- Action: Gas-Operated, open bolt
- Rate of fire: 650 rpm
- Muzzle velocity: 825 m/s
- Effective firing range: 1500 m
- Feed system: Belt-fed
- Sights: Rear leaf, front post

The AEK-999 Barsuk (Russian: Барсук, "badger") is a Russian machine gun chambered for the 7.62×54mmR round. It is a general-purpose machine gun, developed during the 1990s as a modernized version of the PKM to improve its capabilities in the LMG/SAW role. The AEK-999 was to be capable of sustained automatic fire without requiring a quick-change barrel, and better suited for assault operations where it could be fired from the hip or from the integral bipod.

The AEK-999 was developed in the Kovrov Mechanical Plant for the Russian Armed Forces, but lost in military trials to the Pecheneg machine gun which was developed under the same requirements. Kovrov produced small batches of the AEK-999 for the Ministry of Internal Affairs to equip special forces units of the Internal Troops of Russia, but all military production ceased in 2006.

== Design ==
The AEK-999 uses the same receiver group as the PKM. The most important change is a new barrel, made of the same steel used in aviation machine guns for greater durability. This new barrel is partially fluted to save weight and improve heat dissipation, and is provided with a mirage top cover and more effective muzzle brake. This new barrel can be removed from the gun for inspection or maintenance, but it is not a quick-change barrel for swapping out in combat situations. To further enhance its capabilities, the AEK-999 is fitted with a small polymer forend under the barrel, and the folding bipod is moved forward and attached to the barrel rather than the gas tube. If necessary, the AEK-999 can be equipped with a suppressor. It can also accept all standard PKM accessories, including tripod mount, and 100-round clip-on belt boxes.

== See also ==
- Pecheneg
- List of Russian weaponry
