= Los (hunting rifle) =

Bolt-action rifle

- Type: bolt-action rifle
- Place of origin: USSR

Service history
- Wars: Russo-Georgian war (limited)

Production history
- Designer: A. S. Shesterikov
- Manufacturer: Izhevsk Machine-Building Plant
- Produced: since 1961

Specifications
- Mass: 3.3 kg
- Length: 1040 - 1080 mm
- Barrel length: 550mm
- Cartridge: 9×53mmR; 7.62×51mm A
- Rate of fire: variable
- Feed system: 5-round magazine, loaded individually
- Sights: iron sights optical sight

The "Los" (Russian: Лось, lit. 'Moose') is a Soviet bolt-action hunting rifle.

== History ==
The "Los" was designed in early 1960s, the first rifles were made in 1961, although serial production began since 1965.

The rifle received State quality mark of the USSR.

In March 1965, the price of one standard "Los" rifle was between 90 and 100 roubles.

In the first half of the 1970s, experimental 9×53mmR cartridges with hollow bullet for immobilization of wild animals for "Los" rifle were made and tested.

In 1993, Kazan Optical-Mechanical Plant began production of night-vision device for "Bars", "Los-4" and "Los-7" hunting rifles.

In late 1990s, first "Los-9-1" rifles were made.

== Design ==
The "Los" has staggered column non-detachable internal box magazine.

All variants of "Los" rifles have iron sights and they are equipped with scope base for optical sight.

All Soviet rifles had a wooden stock and fore-end, although custom aftermarket variants are known.

== Variants ==
- "Los" («Лось») - first model, 9×53mmR, it has barrel with six grooves (320 mm twist rate). The standard optical sight for this model was TO-4. The last rifle was made in 1976.
- "Los-4" («Лось-4») - 7.62×51mm A, in production since 1975 until 1990. It has barrel with four grooves. The standard optical sight for this model was PO-4×34 (ПО-4×34) made by Zagorsk Optical-Mechanical Plant
- "Los-7" («Лось-7») - 7.62×51mm A

- "Los-7-1" («Лось-7-1») - "Los-7" variant with detachable magazine, 7.62×51mm A

- "Los-8" («Лось-8») - 9.3×64mm Brenneke
- "Los-9" («Лось-9»)

- "Los-9-1" («Лось-9-1») - 9.3×64mm Brenneke, with 5-round detachable box magazine
- "Los-9-2" («Лось-9-2») - .30-06 Springfield
- "Los-9-3" («Лось-9-3») - 7×64mm Brenneke

- Baikal 145 "Los" (Baikal 145 «Лось») - .308 Winchester and .223 Remington, with Picatinny rail. The rifle was announced in 2017. In June 2018, "Kalashnikov Concern" announced the start of its production
- BIL-6,5 (БИЛ-6,5) - 6.5mm target rifle based on "Los" design
- AVL (АВЛ) - 7.62mm target rifle based on "Los" design (chambered for 7.62×54mmR "Extra"). It was used on shooting contests, including Olympic Games, until the rules changed and rifles were limited to small caliber only.
- ROM-20 (РОМ-20) - a 20 gauge bolt-action shotgun (smoothbore version of "Los-7-1"). In March 2002, one test prototype was shown at the "IWA-2002" exhibition.

== Ammunition ==
Serial production of Soviet 7.62×51mm A cartridges with 9.7 g expanding bullet began in 1974.

Soviet 7.62×51mm A cartridges are not interchangeable with foreign 7.62×51mm NATO military cartridges and .308 Winchester commercial cartridges.

== Users ==
- Soviet Union – was allowed as civilian hunting weapon
- Belarus − is allowed as civilian hunting weapon
- Georgia − was used by Georgian militias during the Russo-Georgian war
- Russia − is allowed as civilian hunting weapon
- USA − the import was allowed

== Museum exhibits ==
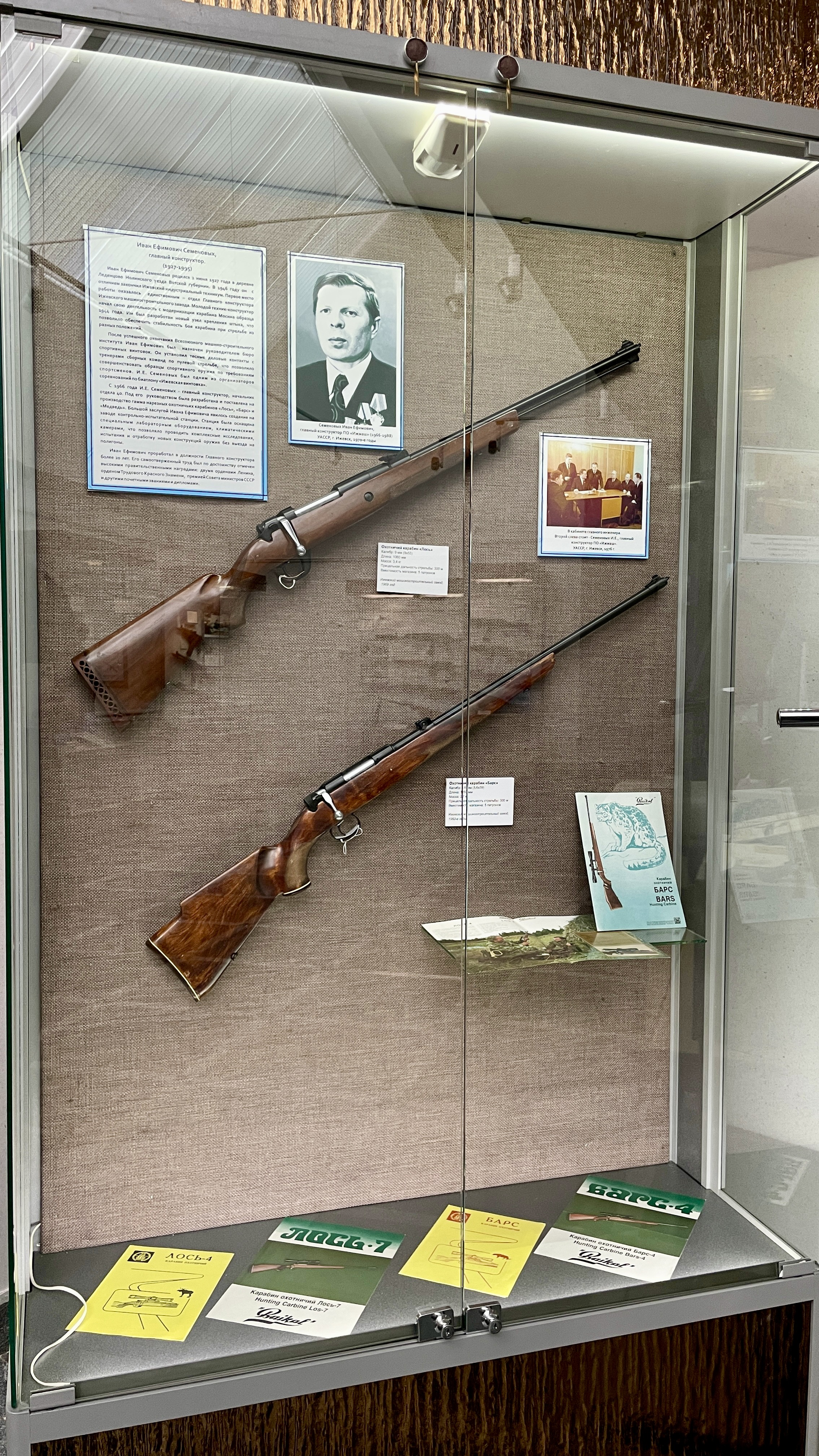
A "Los" hunting rifle in the collection of M. T. Kalashnikov Museum in Izhevsk

- one "Los" hunting rifle is in the collection of M. T. Kalashnikov Museum in Izhevsk

== Sources ==
- Охотничий карабин "Лось" // Спортивно-охотничье оружие и патроны. Бухарест, "Внешторгиздат", 1965. стр.46-47
- Г. Карагодин. Отечественное охотничье оружие // журнал «Охота и охотничье хозяйство», No. 3, 1979. стр.32-34
- М. М. Блюм, И. Б. Шишкин. Твоё ружьё. М., "Физкультура и спорт", 1989. стр.86-87
