= MTs 111 =

Soviet/Russian shotgun

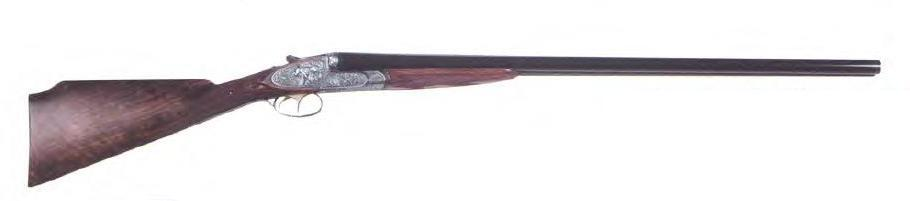
- Type: double barreled shotgun
- Place of origin: USSR

Production history
- Manufacturer: TsKIB SOO

Specifications
- Mass: 3.0 - 3.4 kg
- Barrel length: 750mm
- Cartridge: 12/70mm R 7.62×54mmR; 9×53mmR
- Caliber: 12 gauge
- Action: Break action
- Rate of fire: variable
- Sights: iron sights

The MTs 111 (МЦ 111) is a Soviet and Russian double-barreled high-quality custom hunting shotgun.

== History ==
MTs 111 was designed by TsKIB SOO, it is being produced in small numbers since 1968. It was offered for export to other countries.

MTs 109 and MTs 111 custom shotguns were the most expensive of all hunting firearms made in USSR.

- In December 1981, the price of one custom MTs 111 shotgun was 1,500 roubles.
- In December 1987, the price of one custom MTs 111 shotgun was between 2,100 and 3,000 roubles.

In 1988, it was announced that 20 gauge MTs 111 shotguns would be manufactured, but such guns are unknown.

== Design ==
MTs 111 is a side by side hammerless smoothbore shotgun.

It is equipped with safety mechanism and ejector.

All guns have a walnut shoulder stock (with or without cheekpiece) and fore-end, some of them were decorated with engravings.

MTs 111-07 and MTs 111-09 hunting rifles can be equipped with optical sight.

== Variants ==
- MTs 111-01 (МЦ 111-01) - MTs 111 with different trigger mechanism
- MTs 111-07 (МЦ 111-07) - produced since 1982, 7.62×54mmR hunting rifle with 600mm or 650mm barrels,
- MTs 111-09 (МЦ 111-09) - 9×53mmR double-barreled hunting rifle with 600mm or 650mm barrels (3.8 kg)
- MTs 111-12 (МЦ 111-12) - a 12/70 smoothbore double-barreled shotgun

== Sources ==
- М. М. Блюм, И. Б. Шишкин. Охотничье ружьё. М., «Лесная промышленность», 1983. стр.83, 92-93
- МЦ 111 // Д. М. Закутский, В. А. Лесников, В. В. Филиппов. Охотничье огнестрельное оружие отечественного производства (1968 - 1986 гг.): учебное пособие. М., ВНИИ МВД СССР, 1988. стр.18-20, 32-33
- М. М. Блюм, И. Б. Шишкин. Твоё ружьё. М., "Физкультура и спорт", 1989. стр.72
- МЦ 111 // В. Н. Трофимов. Отечественные охотничьи ружья гладкоствольные. М., ДАИРС, 2000. стр.183-184
