= Gary Tatintsian Gallery =

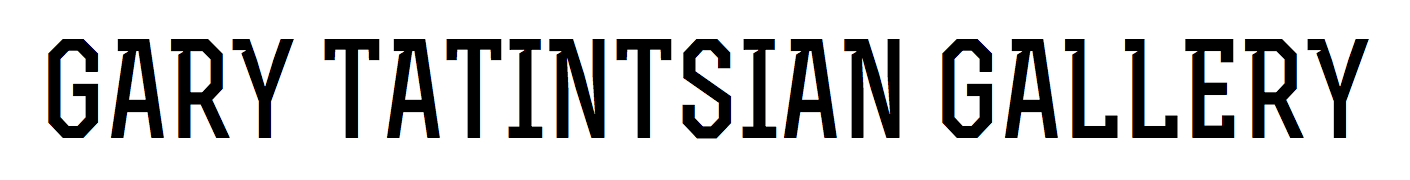

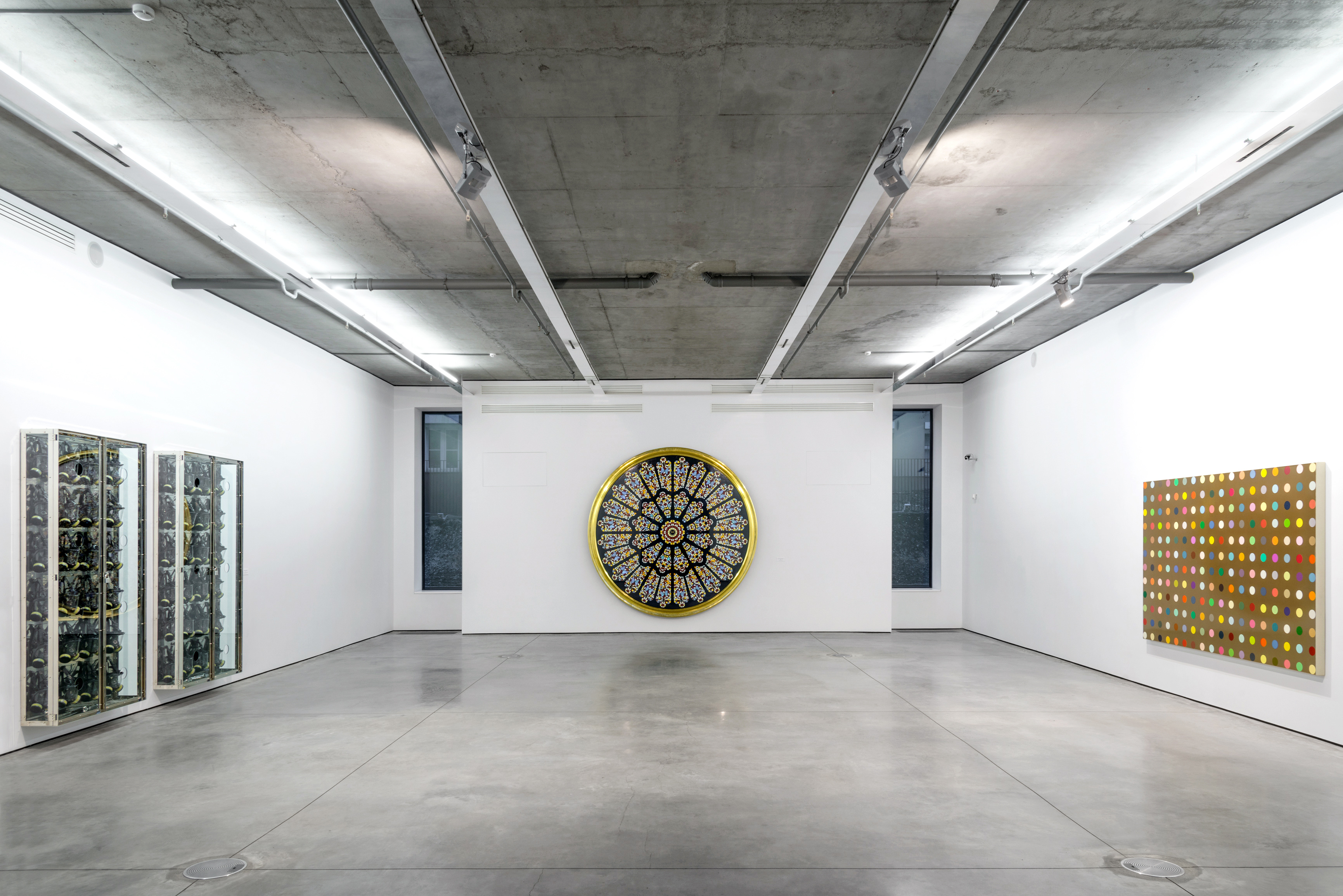
- Established: 1998
- Location: Dubai, UAE
- Type: Art gallery
- Founder: Gary Tatintsian
- Website: www.tatintsian.com

Gary Tatintsian Gallery (Tatintsian Gallery) is a private collection and art gallery that shows contemporary art, founded and owned by art collector and dealer Gary Tatintsian.

== History ==
In 2013, the gallery expanded its space in the Kitay-Gorod district in Moscow city center. The gallery occupied 13,000 square feet (1,200 square meters) at the ArtHouse building, designed by architect Sergey Skuratov. It soon became one of the city’s largest private venues for international contemporary art, events, and public talks, highlighting contemporary artists and trends in conceptual art. It was the first gallery in Moscow to exhibit works by George Condo, Peter Halley, Damien Hirst, Francis Bacon, Tony Matelli, Carroll Dunham, John Currin, Wim Delvoye, and other notable artists. As of October 2025, the gallery’s Moscow location is “temporarily closed” with two galleries open in New York and Dubai.

Following decades of representation of the abstract artist Evgeny Chubarov, Tatintsian Gallery established the Evgeny Chubarov Foundation, which owns and promotes the legacy of over 200 significant paintings and drawings by the artist.

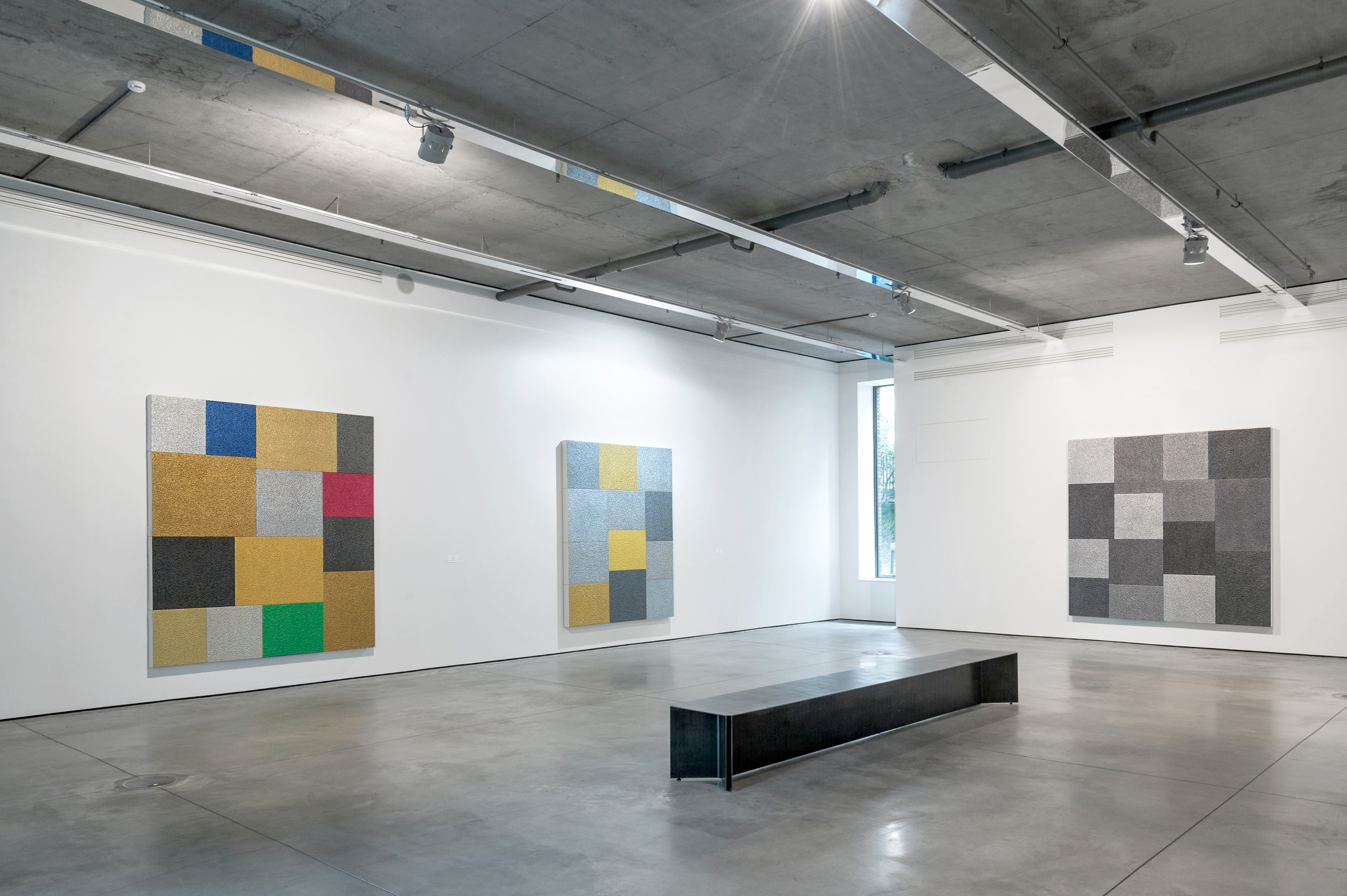
Personal exhibition by Peter Halley in 2017

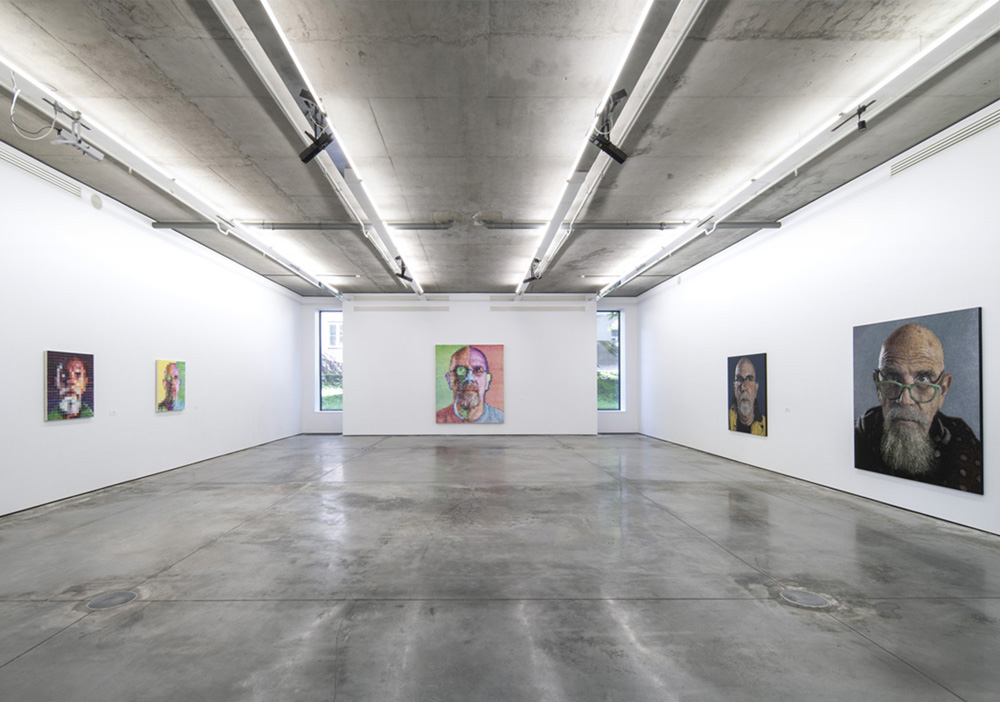
Personal exhibition by Chuck Close in 2021

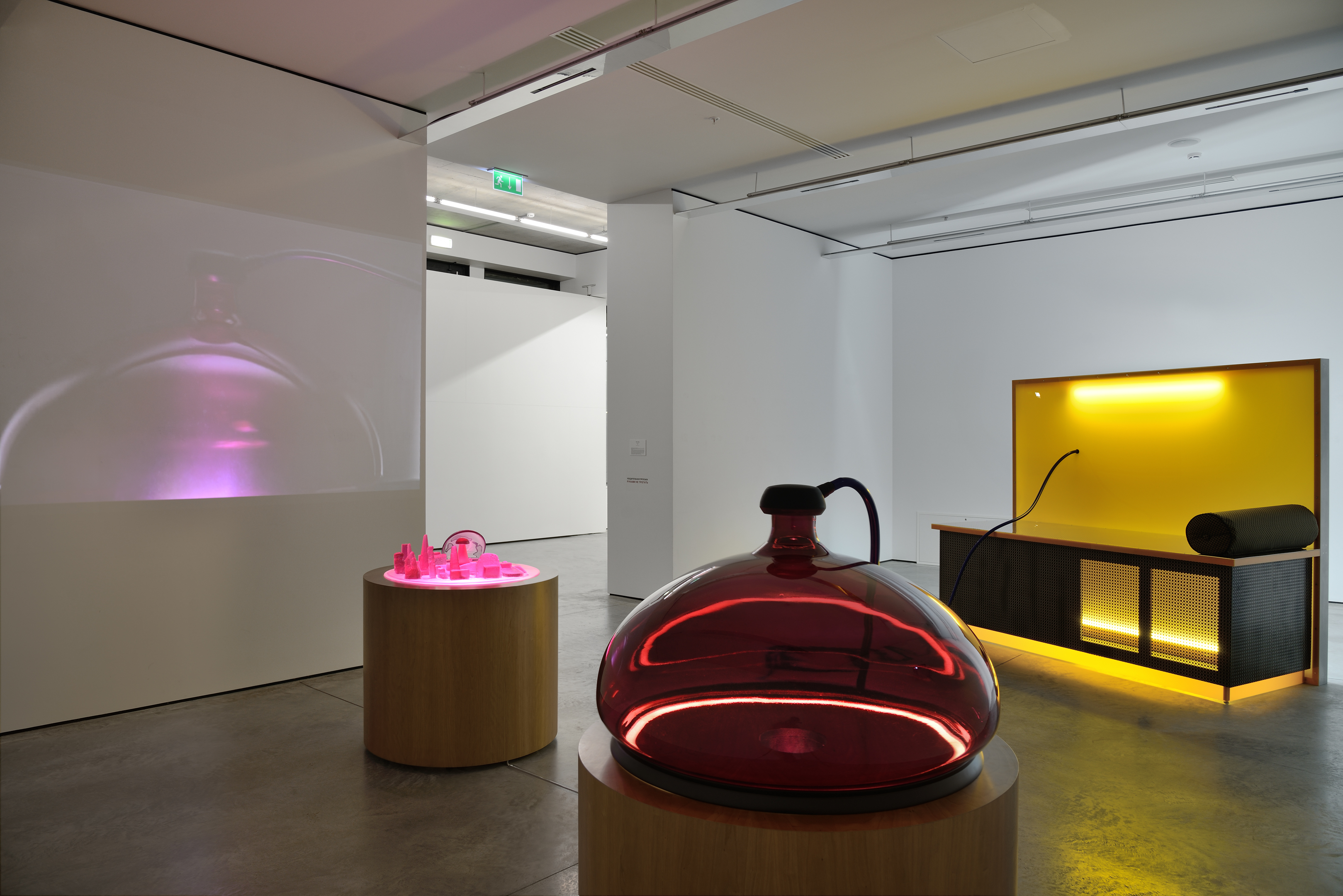
Kandor 20, 2007 by Mike Kelley at the group exhibition 'Mutated Reality' in 2015/16

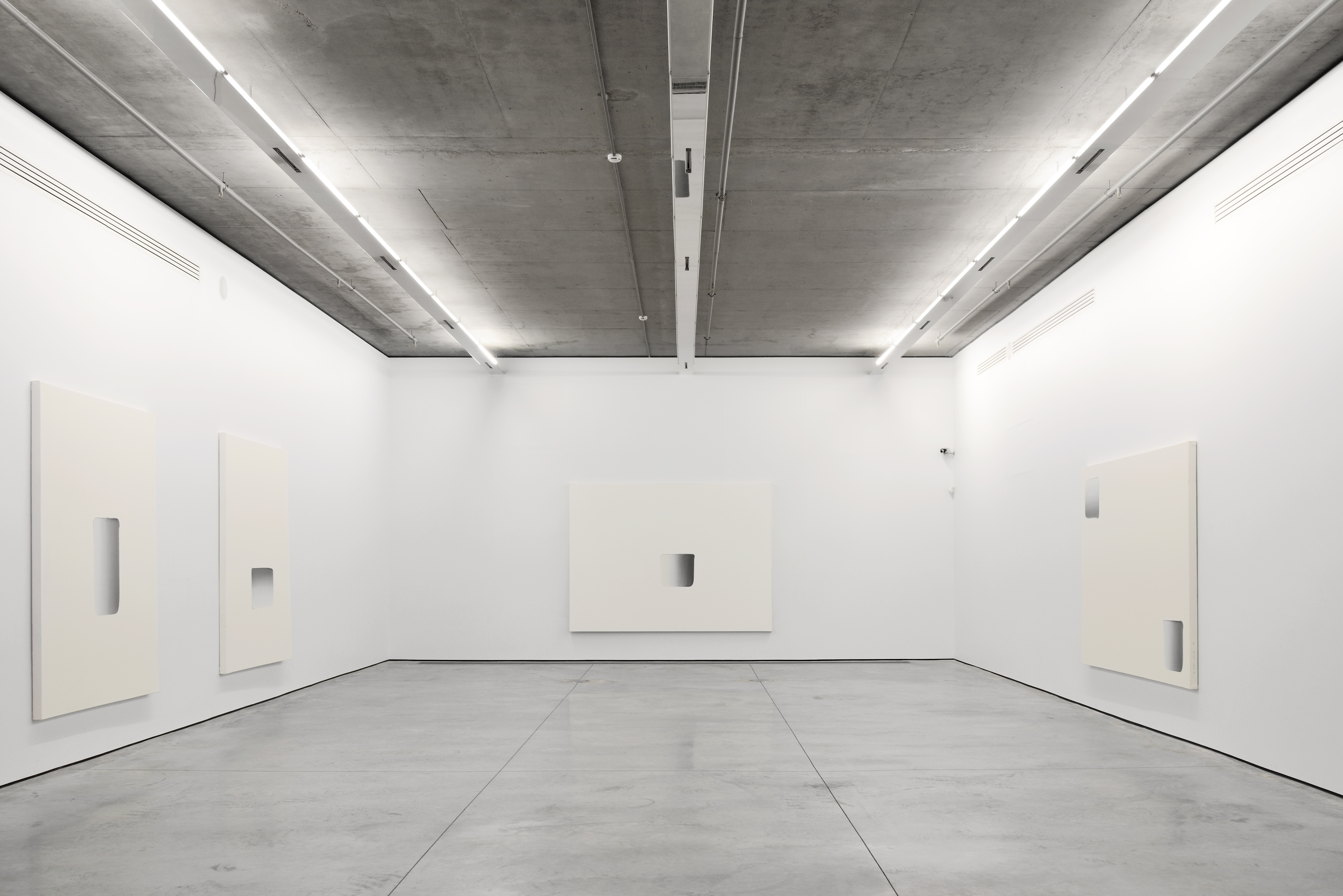
Personal exhibition by Lee Ufan in 2014/15
