= MTs 109 =

Soviet/Russian shotgun

- Type: double barreled shotgun
- Place of origin: USSR

Production history
- Designed: 1968 - 1970
- Manufacturer: TsKIB SOO
- Produced: since 1971

Specifications
- Mass: 3.0 - 3.4 kg
- Barrel length: 750mm
- Caliber: 12 gauge 9×53mmR (MTs 109-09)
- Action: Break action
- Rate of fire: variable
- Sights: iron sights optical sight (MTs 109-09)

The MTs 109 (МЦ 109) is a Soviet and Russian double-barreled high-quality custom hunting shotgun.

== History ==
MTs 109 was designed by N. S. Ryizhov (Н. С. Рыжов) and M. I. Skvortsov (М. И. Скворцов), it is being produced by TsKIB SOO since 1971 in small numbers. It was offered for export to other countries.

MTs 109 and MTs 111 custom shotguns were the most expensive of all hunting firearms made in USSR.

- In October 1981, the price of one custom MTs 109 shotgun was 1,500 roubles
- In December 1987, the price of one custom MTs 109 shotgun was between 2,100 and 3,000 roubles.

More than 400 guns were made.

It is known that several state leaders were among owners of MTs 109 guns (incl. L. I. Brezhnev, Nicolae Ceaușescu, A. G. Lukashenko, S. A. Niyazov and V. V. Putin).

== Design ==
MTs 109 is an over and under hammerless gun with one barrel above the other.

It is equipped with safety mechanism and ejector.

All guns have a walnut shoulder stock (with or without cheekpiece) and fore-end, some of them were decorated with engravings.

MTs 109-09 can be equipped with optical sight

== Variants ==
The MTs 109 shotguns were produced in seven different variants and versions.

- MTs 109-01 (МЦ 109-01) - a 12/70 smoothbore double-barreled shotgun with 750mm barrels
- MTs 109-01S "Sporting" (МЦ 109-01С "Спортинг") - MTs 109-01 with different trigger mechanism
- MTs 109-12 (МЦ 109-12) - a 12/70 smoothbore double-barreled shotgun
- MTs 109-12-07 (МЦ 109-12-07) - a smoothbore double-barreled shotgun equipped with a second pair of barrels
- MTs 109-07 (МЦ 109-07) - produced since 1982, a double-barreled hunting rifle
- MTs 109-09 (МЦ 109-09) - 9×53mmR double-barreled hunting rifle with 675mm barrels. The weight of the gun is 3.6 - 3.8 kg without a scope

== Users ==
- Soviet Union
- Moldova - MTs 109-01 and MTs 109-12 smoothbore shotguns are allowed as civilian hunting weapon
- Russian Federation - since August 1996, only MTs 109-01 and MTs 109-12 smoothbore shotguns are allowed as civilian hunting weapon

== Sources ==
- М. М. Блюм, И. Б. Шишкин. Охотничье ружьё. М., «Лесная промышленность», 1983. стр.82, 91
- МЦ 109 // Д. М. Закутский, В. А. Лесников, В. В. Филиппов. Охотничье огнестрельное оружие отечественного производства (1968 - 1986 гг.): учебное пособие. М., ВНИИ МВД СССР, 1988. стр.31-32, 34-35
- М. М. Блюм, И. Б. Шишкин. Твоё ружьё. М., "Физкультура и спорт", 1989. стр.78-79
