= K-11 (sniper rifle) =

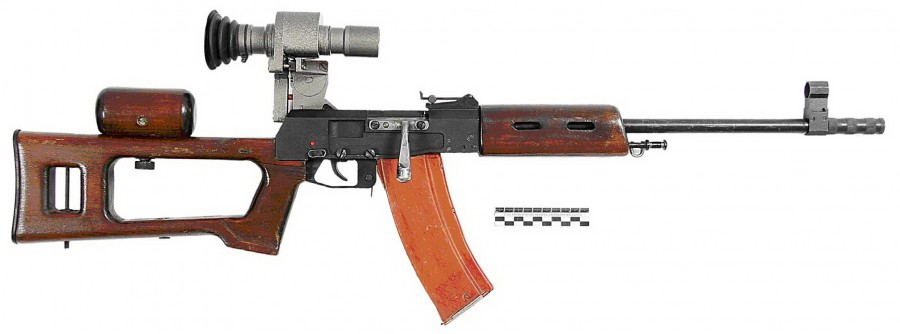
- Type: Sniper rifle
- Place of origin: Armenia

Service history
- Used by: Armenia

Production history
- Designed: 1996
- Manufacturer: Garni-ler

Specifications
- Mass: 3.5 kg
- Length: 920 mm
- Barrel length: 415 mm
- Cartridge: 5.45×39mm 7.62×54mmR
- Action: Manually operated, bolt action
- Feed system: 10 or 30 rounds
- Sights: Telescope sights

The K-11 is an Armenian bolt-action sniper rifle chambered for 5.45×39mm and 7.62×54mmR ammunition with a manually operated firing system. It was developed by the Armenian Ministry of Defence Industrial Department. Little is known about the production and variants of these firearms, as its production is veiled in secrecy. It is evident that a newer produced model called the K11M is now being used by the Armenian Special Forces.

== See also ==
- K-3 (rifle)
