= Berkut rifle =

Berkut
- Type: Semi-automatic rifle
- Place of origin: Russia

Production history
- Designer: V. P. Gryazev
- Manufacturer: KBP Instrument Design Bureau
- Produced: 1998 -

Specifications
- Mass: Berkut-2/Berkut-2M1: 3.9 kg (8.60 lb); Berkut-3: 3.8 kg (8.38 lb)
- Length: 1,130 mm (44.5 in)
- Barrel length: 620 mm (24.4 in)
- Cartridge: .308 Winchester; 7.62×54mmR; 9×53mmR
- Feed system: 5 round box magazine 10 round SVD box magazine
- Sights: open sight, scope

The Berkut (Russian: Беркут, "golden eagle") is a family of semi-automatic, gas-operated hunting carbines designed and manufactured by the KBP Instrument Design Bureau of Tula. The Berkut family of rifles is available in .308 Winchester, 7.62×54mmR, and, for larger game, 9×53mmR. The wooden stock is detachable for easy storage and is available in several different styles such as semi-pistol and thumb-hole.

== Variants ==
- Berkut-1 ("Беркут-1") – 7.62×39mm.
- К-93 ("Беркут-2" and "Беркут-2-1") – .308 Winchester.
  - К-93-1 ("Беркут-2М") – 7.62×54mmR.
- Berkut-3 ("Беркут-3" and "Беркут-3-1") – 9×53mmR.
- Berkut-4 («Беркут-4»)

== Users ==
- Belarus - is allowed as civilian hunting weapon
- Russian Federation

== Sources ==
- Карабин самозарядный К-93-1. Паспорт К-93.00.000 ПС
- Беркут // А. И. Благовестов. То, из чего стреляют в СНГ / ред. А. Е. Тарас. Минск, «Харвест», М., ООО «Издательство АСТ», 2000. стр.561
- Виктор Рон. "Беркут" - птица хищная // журнал "Оружие", № 12, 2010. стр.63
- Алексей Блюм. Карабин в стиле "милитари" // журнал "Оружие", № 12, 2010. стр.64
