= 9×53mmR =

Rifle cartridge

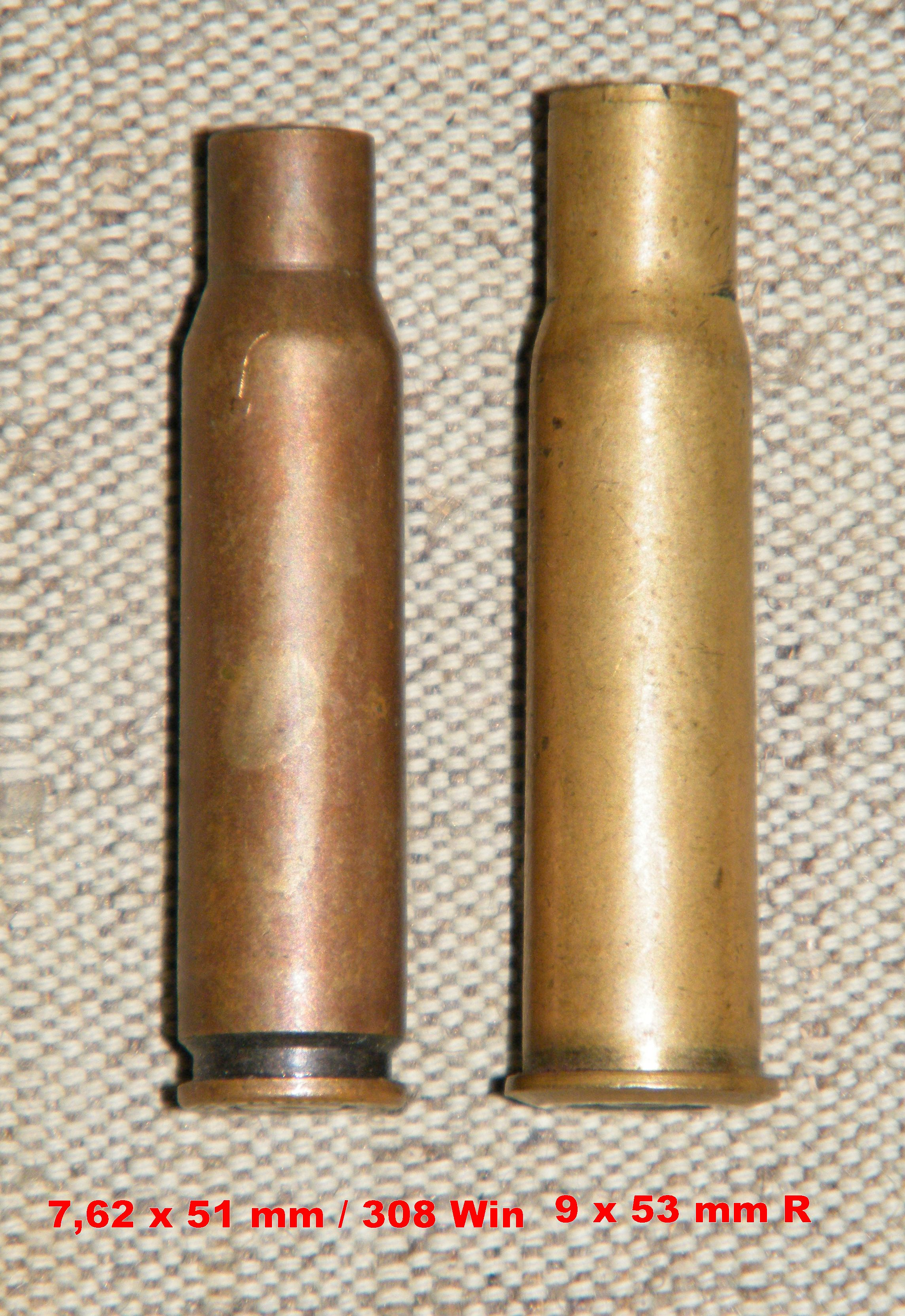
- Type: Rifle
- Place of origin: Soviet Union

Service history
- In service: 1962–present
- Used by: Soviet Union, Russia

Production history
- Designer: M. N. Blum
- Designed: 1955
- Produced: 1962–1992, 1997–present

Specifications
- Parent case: 7.62×54mmR
- Case type: Rimmed
- Bullet diameter: 9.22 mm (0.363 in)
- Land diameter: 9.00 mm (0.354 in)
- Neck diameter: 9.86 mm (0.388 in)
- Shoulder diameter: 11.63 mm (0.458 in)
- Base diameter: 12.42 mm (0.489 in)
- Rim diameter: 14.48 mm (0.570 in)
- Rim thickness: 1.575 mm (0.0620 in)
- Case length: 53 mm (2.1 in)
- Overall length: 67.8 mm (2.67 in)
- Maximum pressure: 254.80 MPa

Ballistic performance
Bullet mass/type	Velocity	Energy
15 LVE	640 m/s (2,100 ft/s)	3,072 J (2,266 ft⋅lbf)

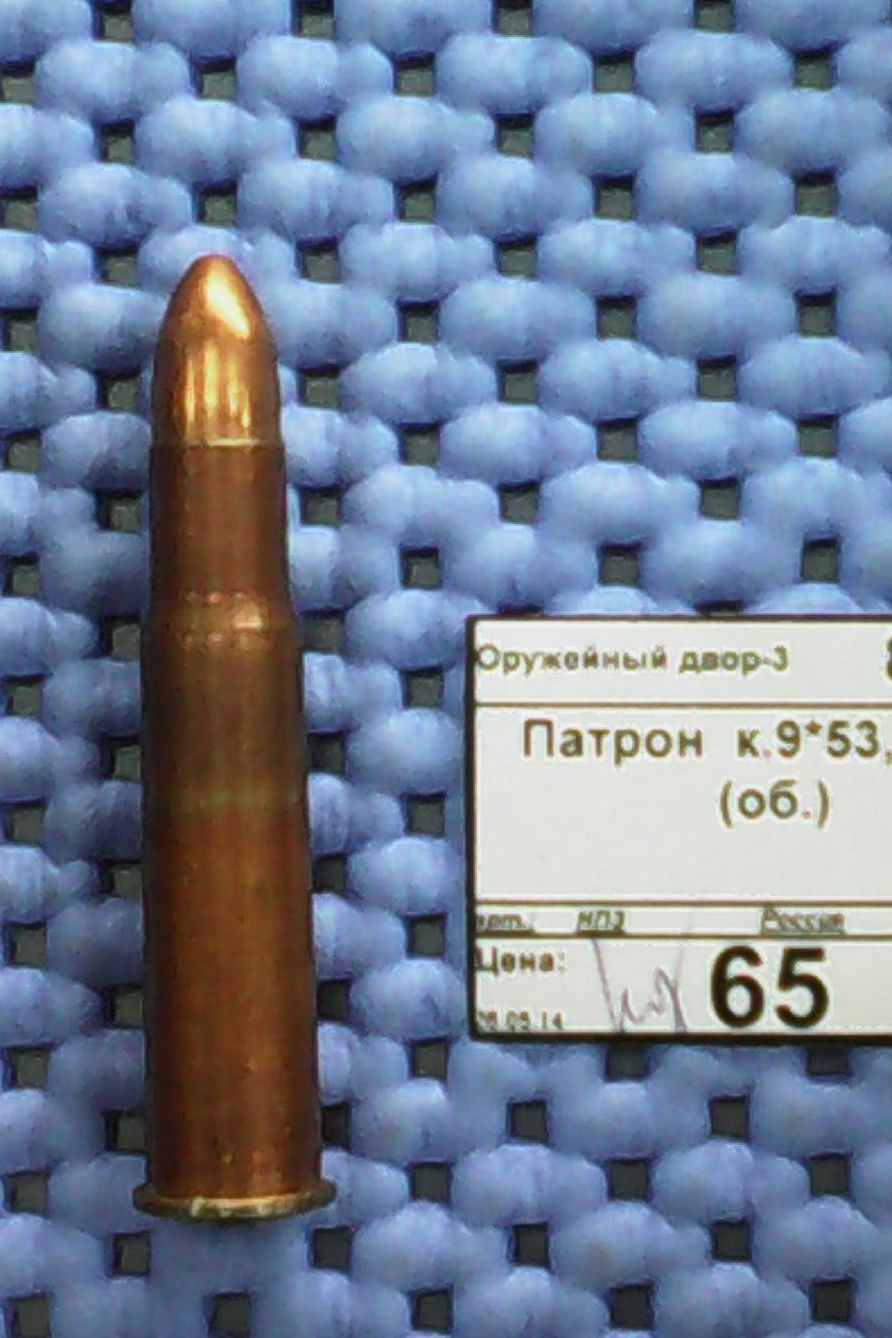
9×53mmR

The 9×53mmR rifle cartridge was designed for hunting in the USSR. It is a 7.62×54mmR necked up to accommodate a larger bullet.

== History ==
It was offered for export to other countries.

Since 1971 two bullet types are available:

- Type A - SP for hunting 250–500 kg animals
- Type B - FMJ for hunting 70–250 kg animals

Soviet 9×53mmR cartridges were loaded with smokeless powder VT (винтовочный пироксилиновый порох ВТ), as well as Soviet 5.6×39mm and 7.62×54mmR hunting cartridges.

== Firearms ==
In the USSR, several rifles were designed for this cartridge: bolt-action carbine "Los", self-loading carbine "Medved'", combination guns TOZ-55 "Zubr", MTs-7-09, MTs 30, MTs-109-09, MTs-110-09, MTs-111-09 and TOZ-84-12/9,27.

In the Russian Federation, several rifles were designed for this cartridge: "IZh-94 "Express"; "Berkut-3", "Saiga-9 rifle" (it was produced since 2001 until 2005) and VPO-103.

== Notes ==
This 9×53mmR Russian cartridge should not be confused with 9.3×53mmR Finnish, a hunting cartridge from Finland based on the same Russian 7.62x54R case. This was developed in Finland to be compliant with hunting regulations limiting use of the 7.62x54R cartridges for large frame game species. It also has similar dimensions, but a significantly larger and heavier 9.3mm (.366 caliber) diameter bullet, 71.45 mm overall cartridge length with, more importantly, a significantly higher speed along with a higher C.I.P. maximum pressure (than the bespoke 9x53mmR Russian hunting cartridge) - 340 MPa - resulting in higher terminal energy ratings at reasonable hunting ranges. At one time SAKO factory ammunition was available, but currently Boxer primed cartridges are most easily formed from modern Boxer-primed brass cases by expanding the neck of standard brass 7.62x54R to the appropriate diameter.

== See also ==
- 9 mm caliber
- List of rimmed cartridges
- List of rifle cartridges
- Table of handgun and rifle cartridges

== Sources ==
- М. Блюм. Охотничьи патроны к нарезному оружию // журнал "Охота и охотничье хозяйство", № 6, 1973. стр.26-28
- М. М. Блюм, И. Б. Шишкин. Твоё ружьё. М., "Физкультура и спорт", 1989. стр.106
- Патроны охотничьи 9x53 // Охотничье и спортивное оружие. М., Внешторгиздат. 1989.
- А. В. Кузьминский. Оружие для охотника: практическое пособие / под общ. ред. А. Е. Тараса М., ООО «Издательство АСТ», 2002. стр.250-251
