= Medved (hunting rifle) =

Soviet semi-automatic hunting rifle

- Type: semi-automatic rifle
- Place of origin: USSR

Production history
- Designer: V. M. Zorin; E. M. Kamenev
- Manufacturer: Izhevsk Machine-Building Plant
- Produced: since 1965

Specifications
- Mass: 3.3 kg
- Length: 1110 mm
- Barrel length: 550mm
- Cartridge: 9×53mmR; 7.62×51mm A
- Rate of fire: variable
- Effective firing range: 300 m ("Medved" without optical sight); 500 m (with optical sight)
- Sights: iron sights optical sight

The "Medved" ("Медведь") is a Soviet semi-automatic hunting rifle for big-game hunting.

== History ==
The "Medved" was designed in early 1960s. In 1965, rifle was awarded the golden medal of the Leipzig Trade Fair and since 1965 began its serial production.

In April 1965, the price of one standard "Medved" rifle was between 130 and 150 roubles.

Since 1975 began the production of "Medved-3" variant.

Since 1982 began the production of "Medved-4" variant.

== Design ==
All variants of "Medved" rifles have iron sights and they were equipped with scope base for optical sight.

- PO-4×34 (ПО-4×34) and TO-6P (ТО-6П) scopes were standard optical sights, although custom aftermarket variants are known.
- in 1969 one "Medved" rifle was equipped with night-vision device.

All Soviet rifles had a wooden stock and fore-end, although custom aftermarket variants are known.

The bolt has three lugs.

The ramrod is fixed under the barrel.

== Variants ==
- "Medved" (СОК-9 «Медведь») - first model, 9×53mmR, with fixed magazine (3 rounds) The rifle received State quality mark of the USSR
- "Medved-2" («Медведь-2») - second model, 9×53mmR with detachable box magazine (3 rounds)
- "Medved-3" (СОК-308 «Медведь-3») - third model, 7.62×51mm A with detachable single column box magazine (4 rounds)
- "Medved-4" («Медведь-4») - last model, 7.62×51mm A with detachable staggered column box magazine (4 rounds)

== Ammunition ==
Soviet 7.62×51mm A cartridges (ГОСТ 21169-75) are not interchangeable with foreign 7.62×51mm NATO military cartridges and .308 Winchester commercial cartridges.

== Museum exhibits ==
- one "Medved-3" rifle is in collection of M. T. Kalashnikov Museum in Izhevsk

== Sources ==
- Самозарядный охотничий карабин "Медведь" // Спортивно-охотничье оружие и патроны. Бухарест, "Внешторгиздат", 1965. стр.48
- М. М. Блюм, И. Б. Шишкин. Охотничье ружьё. М., «Лесная промышленность», 1983. стр.95
- М. М. Блюм, И. Б. Шишкин. Твоё ружьё. М., "Физкультура и спорт", 1989. стр.87-88
- Карабин самозарядный "Медведь-4" // Охотничье и спортивное оружие. М., Внешторгиздат. 1989.
- Кирилл Тесемников. Охотничий самозарядный карабин «Медведь» // журнал «Мастер-ружьё», № 71, февраль 2003. стр.20-21
