= PKP Pecheneg =

Russian general-purpose machine gun

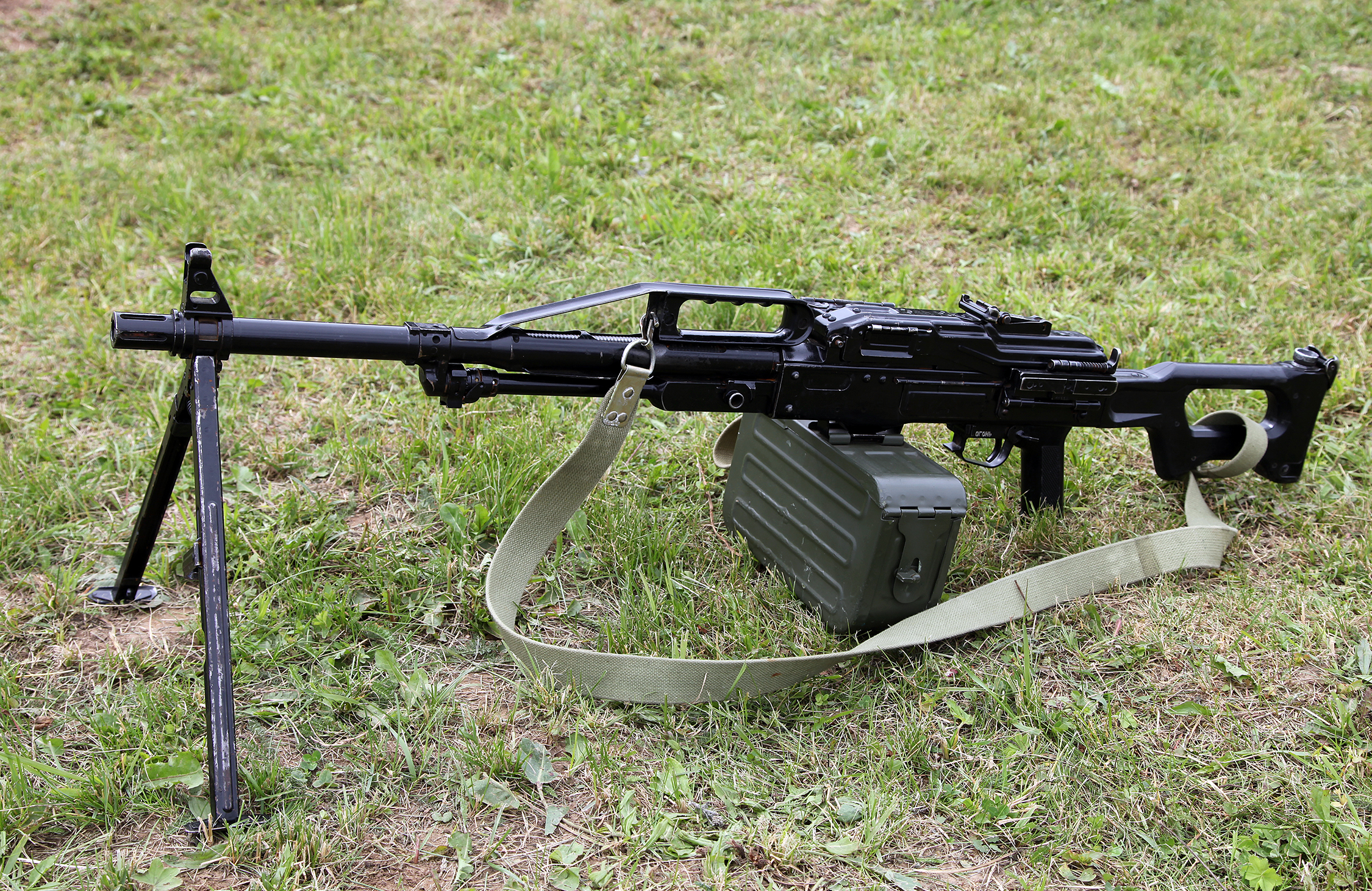
- PKP Pecheneg with its bipod deployed
- Type: General purpose machine gun Medium machine gun
- Place of origin: Russia

Service history
- In service: 2001–present
- Used by: See Users
- Wars: Second Chechen War; Russo-Georgian War; Syrian Civil War; War in Iraq (2013–2017); Russo-Ukrainian War

Production history
- Designer: Mikhail Kalashnikov
- Designed: 1995
- Manufacturer: TsNIITochMash, Degtyaryov Plant
- Variants: See Variants

Specifications
- Mass: 8.2 kg (18 lb) without a bipod 8.7 kg (19 lb) with a bipod 12.7 kg (28 lb) with an infantry tripod mount
- Length: 1,200 mm (47 in)
- Barrel length: 658 mm (25.9 in)
- Cartridge: 7.62×54mmR
- Action: Gas-operated
- Rate of fire: 600–800 rounds/min
- Muzzle velocity: 900 m/s (2,953 ft/s)
- Effective firing range: 1,500 m (0.93 mi)
- Maximum firing range: 6,000 m (6,600 yd)
- Feed system: Belt feed: 100-, 200-, 250-round, non-disintegrating links

The PKP Pecheneg (Russian: Pulemyot Kalashnikova Pekhotny "Печенег"), GRAU index: 6P41, is a Russian 7.62×54mmR general-purpose machine gun, developed as a further modification of the PKM machine gun. The Pecheneg designation refers to the Pecheneg people, a warlike tribe of Turkic origin who lived in what later became the steppes of southern Russia and Ukraine.

The PKP Pecheneg is currently in use by the Russian Army and Spetsnaz units in significant numbers. Even though the PKP Pecheneg was developed mainly for infantry use, it also has been fitted to several light armoured vehicles.

== Design details ==
The PKP Pecheneg is said to be more accurate than the PK and PKM due to a heavier, removable, partially forced-air-cooled barrel with radial cooling ribs and a handle which eliminates the haze effect from hot gases and keeps the barrel cooler, making the machine gun more reliable. Furthermore, the PKP Pecheneg is capable of mounting telescopic sights or optical sights by the use of a side mounted dovetail rail mount, which increases its accuracy and effective range. In general, the PKP Pecheneg retained up to 80% parts commonality with the PKM.

According to the manufacturer, the PKP Pecheneg can fire 600 rounds in rapid fire without damaging the barrel. During prolonged combat engagement, it can safely fire up to 1,000 rounds of ammunition per hour without degrading its combat effectiveness and reducing barrel life.

A steel jacket encloses the barrel from the front of the trunnion to the muzzle. Middle part of the barrel, from the front of the trunnion, to the gas block has transverse grooves to increase the surface area for better cooling. There are oval holes on the jacket in the ribbed section of the barrel for access of air.

From the gas block to the muzzle there are 4 longitudinal grooves cut in the barrel. They are covered by the jacket. The grooves connect 4 holes in the gas block and 4 holes on the front end of the muzzle device. Low pressure created at the front of the jacket during firing draws cool air through the grooves, cooling the front part of the barrel, similarly to the Lewis machine gun.

Constant forced cooling of the front part of the barrel reduces dispersion when firing, and also increases the durability of the barrel. The service life of the barrel is estimated at 25,000 to 30,000 rounds.

== Variants ==
=== PKP Pecheneg-N ===
The PKP Pecheneg-N (GRAU index: 6P41N) is a variant that features a side mounted dovetail rail for night vision sights and other optical sights.

=== Pecheneg-SP ===
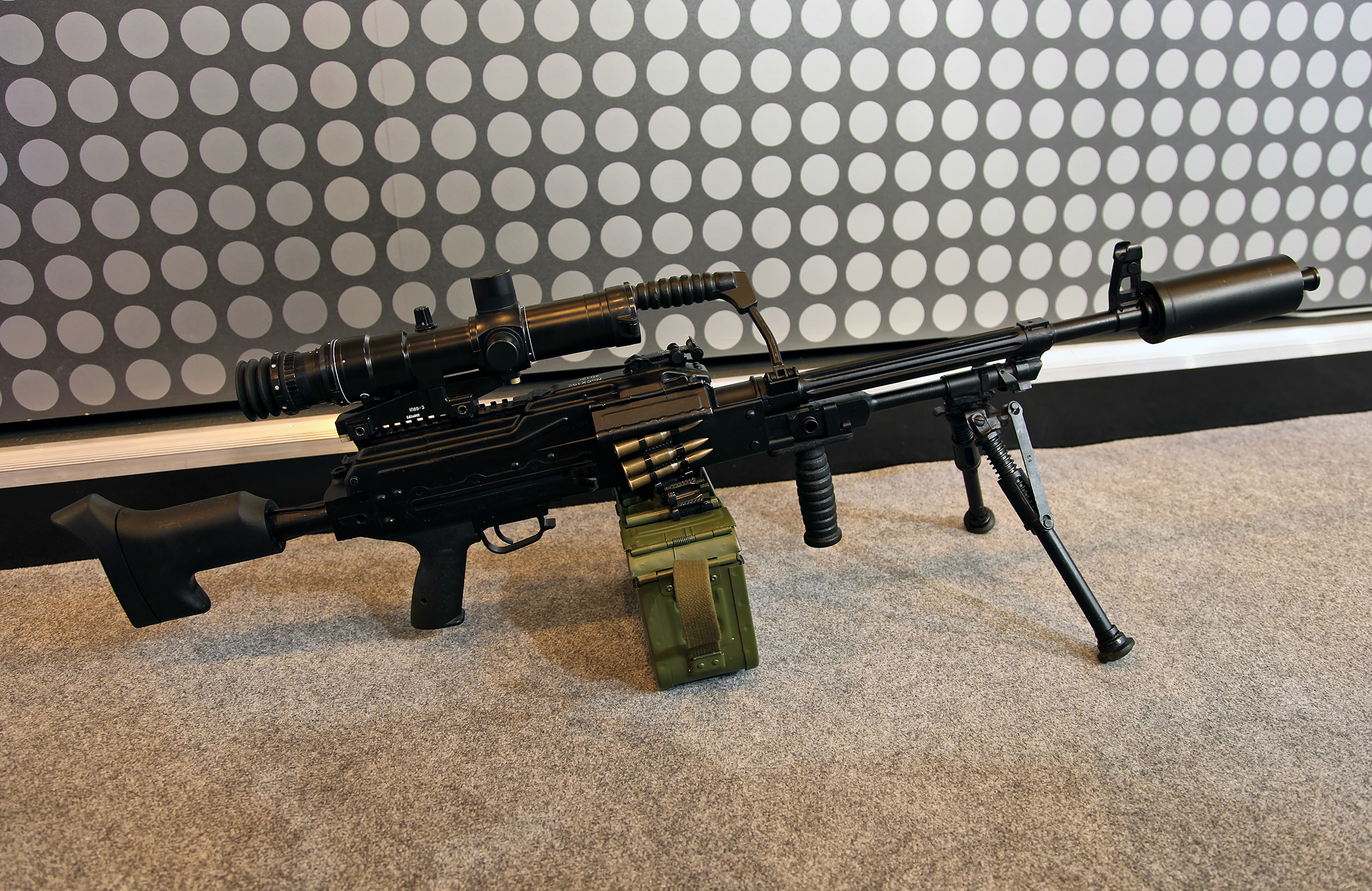
PKP Pecheneg-SP with a telescopic sight and suppressor

The Pecheneg-SP (GRAU index: 6P69) is an improved variant and a further modernisation of the PKP Pecheneg that uses a titanium material for its construction. The "SP" stands for special forces machine gun. It features a redesigned barrel and comes in two different lengths (standard and shortened configurations). It is also capable of mounting a suppressor to minimise noise and flash signature. Additional features such as a Picatinny rail for mounting various optical sights, such as the 1P89-3 unified optical sight, a telescopic folding stock, which makes it 30 mm (3 cm) shorter compared to the Kalashnikov rifles when folded, and an optional vertical foregrip for easier recoil management, which was requested by the Russian military. Its serial production started in February 2017.

=== Bullpup conversions ===
Two prototype bullpup conversions of the PKP Pecheneg have been developed. An example documented in a 2016 article from The Firearm Blog features a skeletonised lower handguard and its carry handle replaced with a Picatinny rail mount, and has had its overall length reduced by 280 mm (11 in). Another photographed c. 2012 retains the carry handle. To accommodate this configuration, both versions have the belt box sit at a 135° angle in front of the grip and trigger assembly.

=== STrL-P ===
The STrL-P is a Vietnamese unlicensed copy of the PKP Pecheneg, made by Z111 Factory.

== Users ==
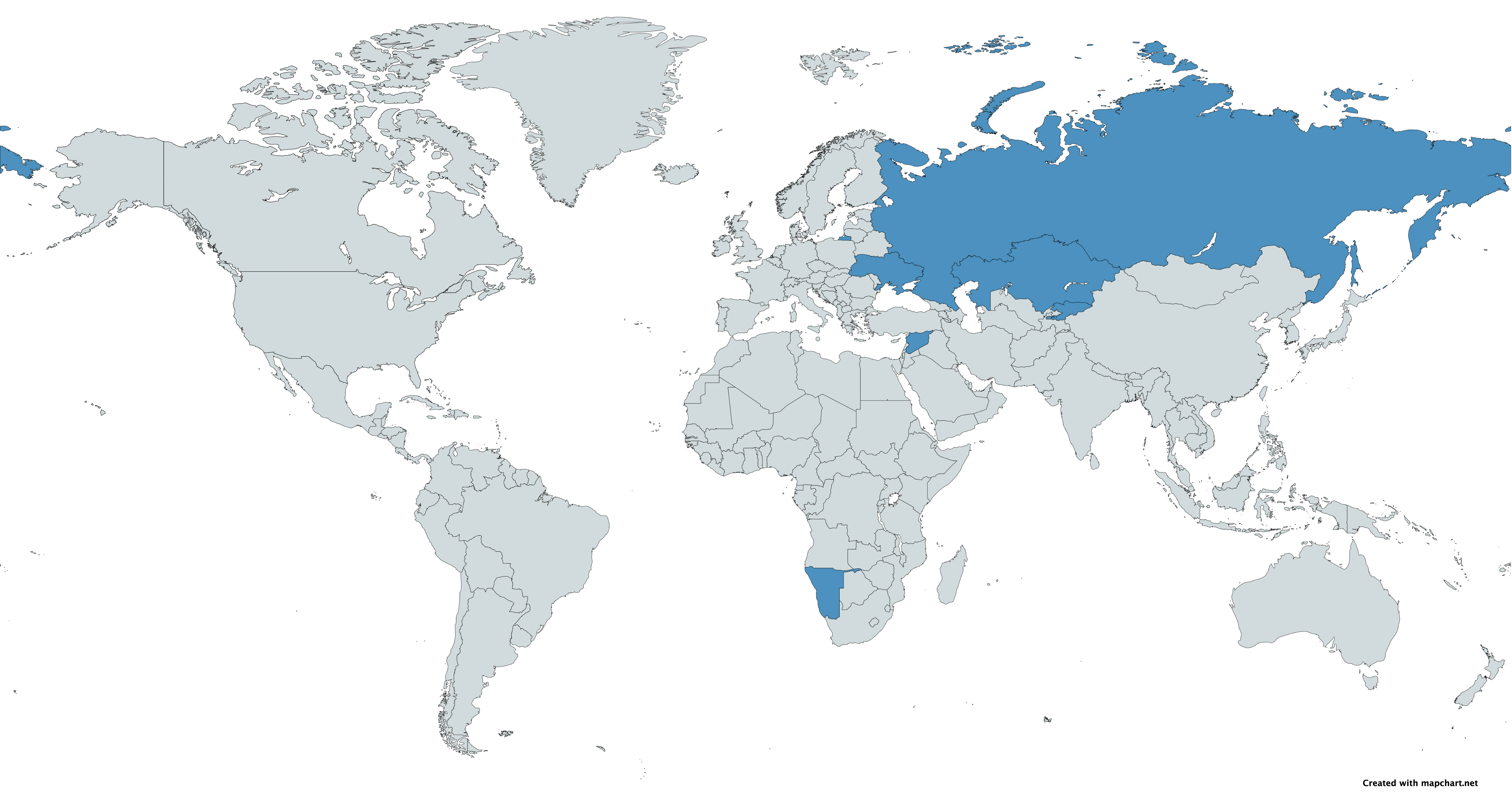
Map with PKP Pecheneg users in blue

- Kazakhstan
- Kyrgyzstan
- Namibia
- Russia
- (Syrian opposition) Syria
- Ukraine
