= Kazan Optical-Mechanical Plant =

Russian optical company

Coordinates: 55.8758342°N 49.216894°E

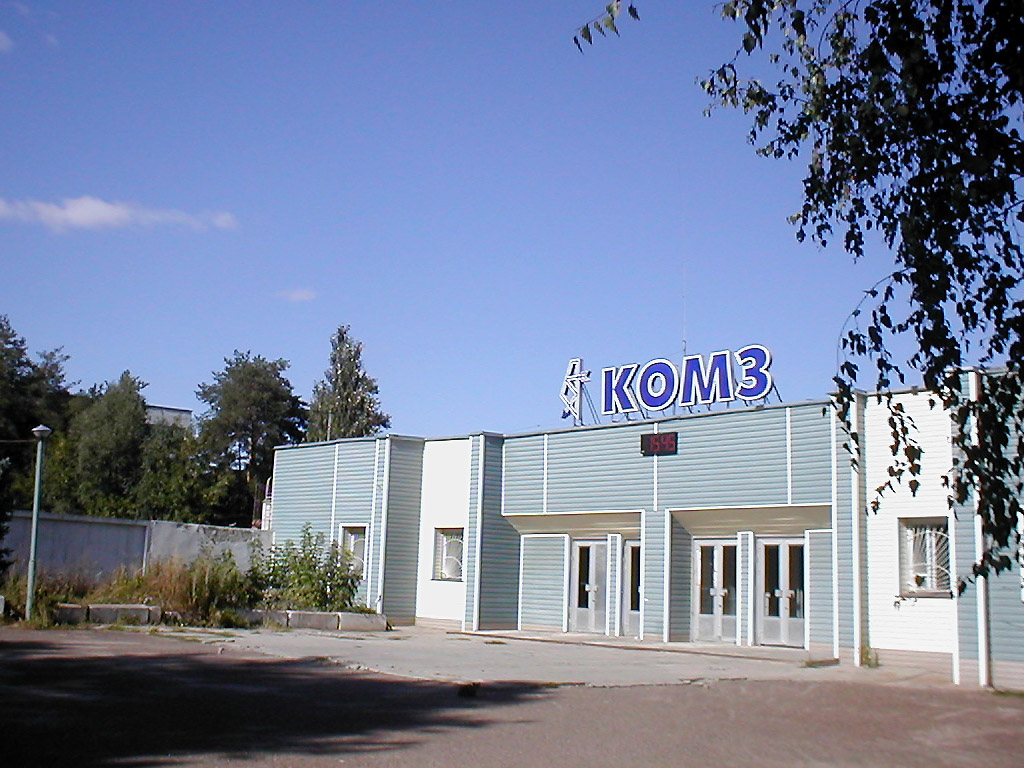
- Built: 1940
- Location: Kazan, Russia
- Products: Optical and mechanical equipment
- Website: http://www.baigish.ru/

Kazan Optical-Mechanical Plant (Russian: Казанский оптико-механический завод), commonly known by its Russian initials KOMZ, is an optics manufacturer based in Kazan, Russia.

KOMZ develops and produces a wide range of optical-electronic and optical-mechanical instruments, including submarine periscopes, aerial cameras, satellite cameras, laser rangefinders, binoculars and night-vision instruments. It is well known for developing and manufacturing binoculars and monoculars under the Baigish brand. The plant also produces a number of specialized optical devices for the Russian defense industry.

== History ==
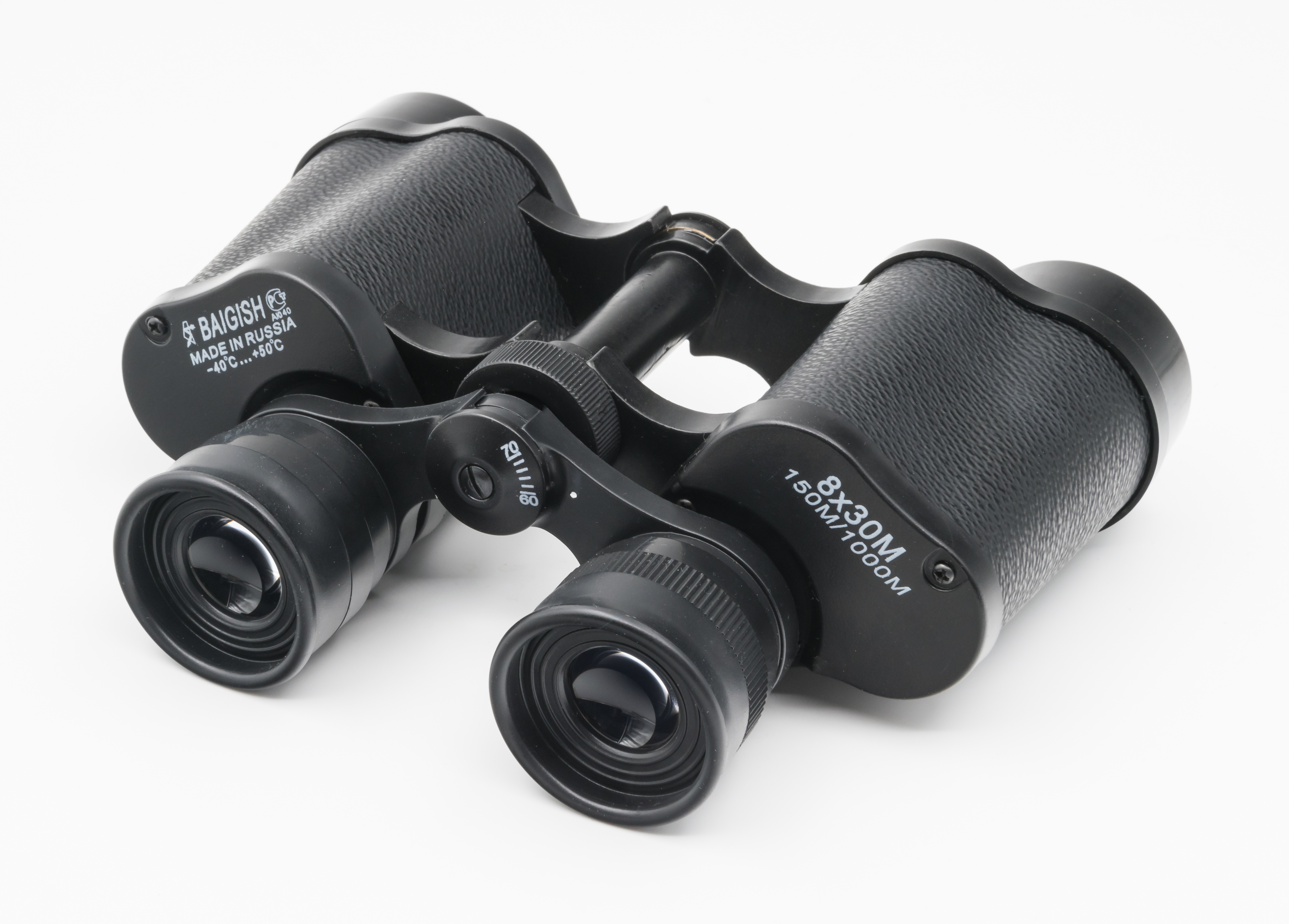
Baigish binoculars manufactured by KOMZ.

KOMZ was established on 8 February 1940, primarily to manufacture binoculars, artillery scopes, and tank sights for the Red Army. Most of the plant's engineers and production staff were transferred from the State Optical-Mechanical Plant in Leningrad (known as GOMZ and later as LOMO). By the end of World War II, KOMZ had produced 700,000 scopes and pairs of binoculars for the Soviet war effort. In the postwar era, KOMZ also manufactured a number of products for the commercial market, namely film cameras.

During the late 1980s, KOMZ greatly diversified its product range and also began to manufacture laser rangefinders, depth gauges, laser spectrometers, and medical instruments.

== Management ==
General manager – Maximov Vadim Valerievich.
