= 7.62×54mmR =

Russian military rifle cartridge

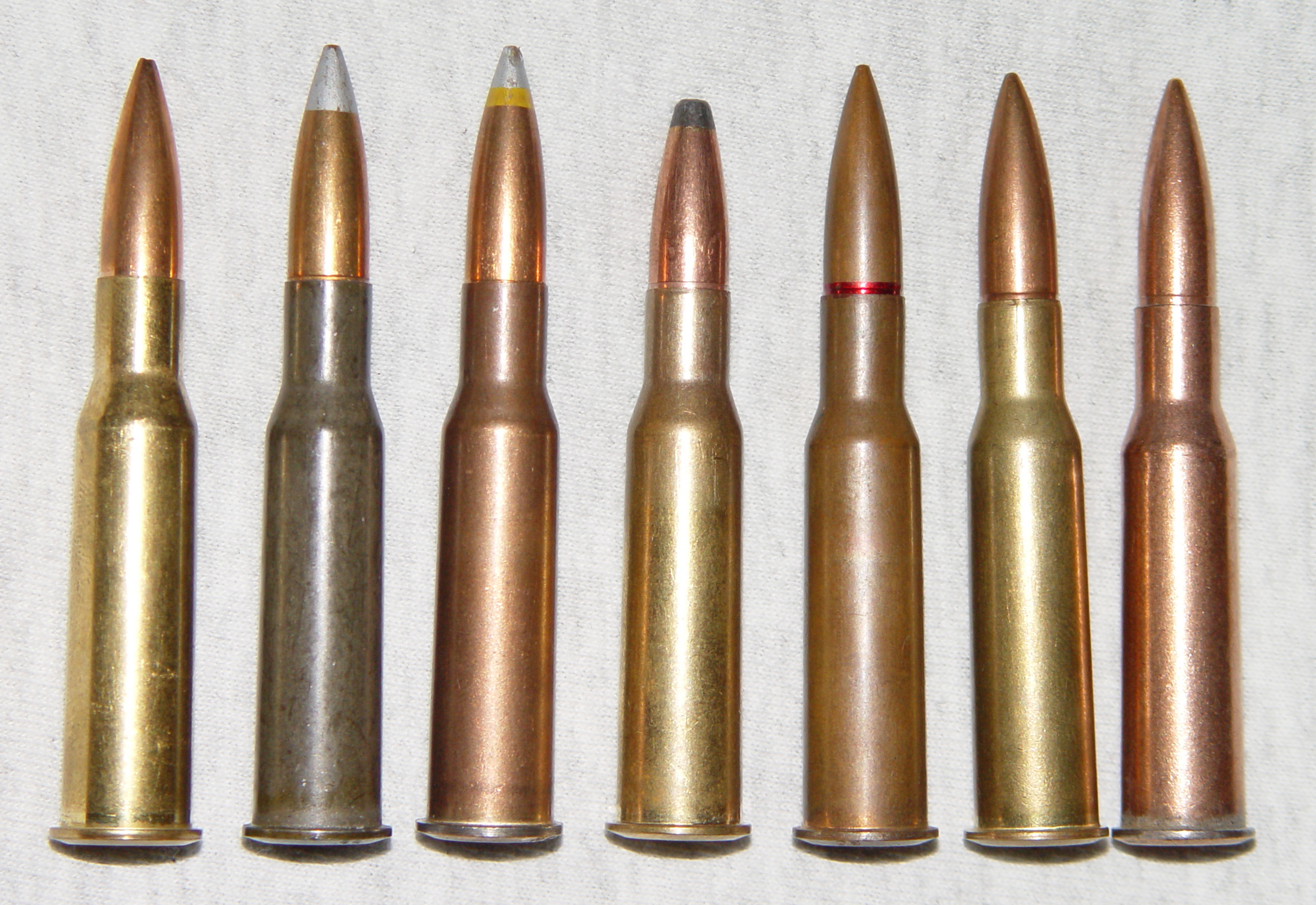
- Examples of 7.62×54mmR rimmed ammunition. The photo shows, reading from left to right: Sellier & Bellot hollow-point boat tail; "Czech silver tip", mild steel core, light ball; Hungarian silver/yellow-tip, mild steel core, heavy ball; Wolf Ammunition gold soft-point; USSR 1986 steel-core light ball, Factory 60; Yugoslav surplus (1953); USSR 1940s lead-core light ball
- Type: Rifle
- Place of origin: Russian Empire

Service history
- In service: 1891–present
- Used by: Russian Federation (including the Soviet Union and Russian Empire); Spanish Second Republic; Albania; Cambodia; Cuba; Finland; Laos; North Korea; China; Vietnam; Iran; Iraq; Serbia; Others
- Wars: Boxer Rebellion; Russo-Japanese War; World War I; Russian Civil War; Soviet–Japanese border conflicts; Spanish Civil War; Winter War; World War II; Korean War; Vietnam War; Laotian Civil War; Cambodian Civil War; Cambodian–Vietnamese War; Soviet–Afghan War; Iran–Iraq War; Yugoslav wars; First Chechen War; Gulf War; Second Chechen War; War in Afghanistan (2001–2021); Iraq War; Cambodian–Thai border dispute; Russia–Georgia war; Libyan Civil War; Syrian civil war; Yemeni civil war (2014–present); Saudi-led intervention in the Yemeni civil war; Russo-Ukrainian War; Other wars

Production history
- Designer: Colonel N. F. Rogovtsev
- Designed: 1891
- Produced: 1891–present

Specifications
- Case type: Rimmed, bottleneck
- Bullet diameter: 7.92 mm (0.312 in)
- Land diameter: 7.62 mm (0.300 in)
- Neck diameter: 8.53 mm (0.336 in)
- Shoulder diameter: 11.61 mm (0.457 in)
- Base diameter: 12.37 mm (0.487 in)
- Rim diameter: 14.48 mm (0.570 in)
- Rim thickness: 1.60 mm (0.063 in)
- Case length: 53.72 mm (2.115 in)
- Overall length: 77.16 mm (3.038 in)
- Case capacity: 4.16 cm^{3} (64.2 gr H_{2}O)
- Rifling twist: 240 mm (1 in 9.45 in)
- Primer type: Berdan or boxer large rifle
- Maximum pressure: 390.00 MPa (56,565 psi)

Ballistic performance
Bullet mass/type	Velocity	Energy
11.3 g (174 gr) HPBT	797 m/s (2,610 ft/s)	3,593 J (2,650 ft⋅lbf)
11.7 g (181 gr) FMJ	786 m/s (2,580 ft/s)	3,614 J (2,666 ft⋅lbf)
11.7 g (181 gr) SP	800 m/s (2,600 ft/s)	3,744 J (2,761 ft⋅lbf)
9.7 g (150 gr) FMJ	865 m/s (2,840 ft/s)	3,629 J (2,677 ft⋅lbf)
11.7 g (181 gr) SP	805 m/s (2,640 ft/s)	3,779 J (2,787 ft⋅lbf)
- Test barrel length: 73 cm (28 in); Source

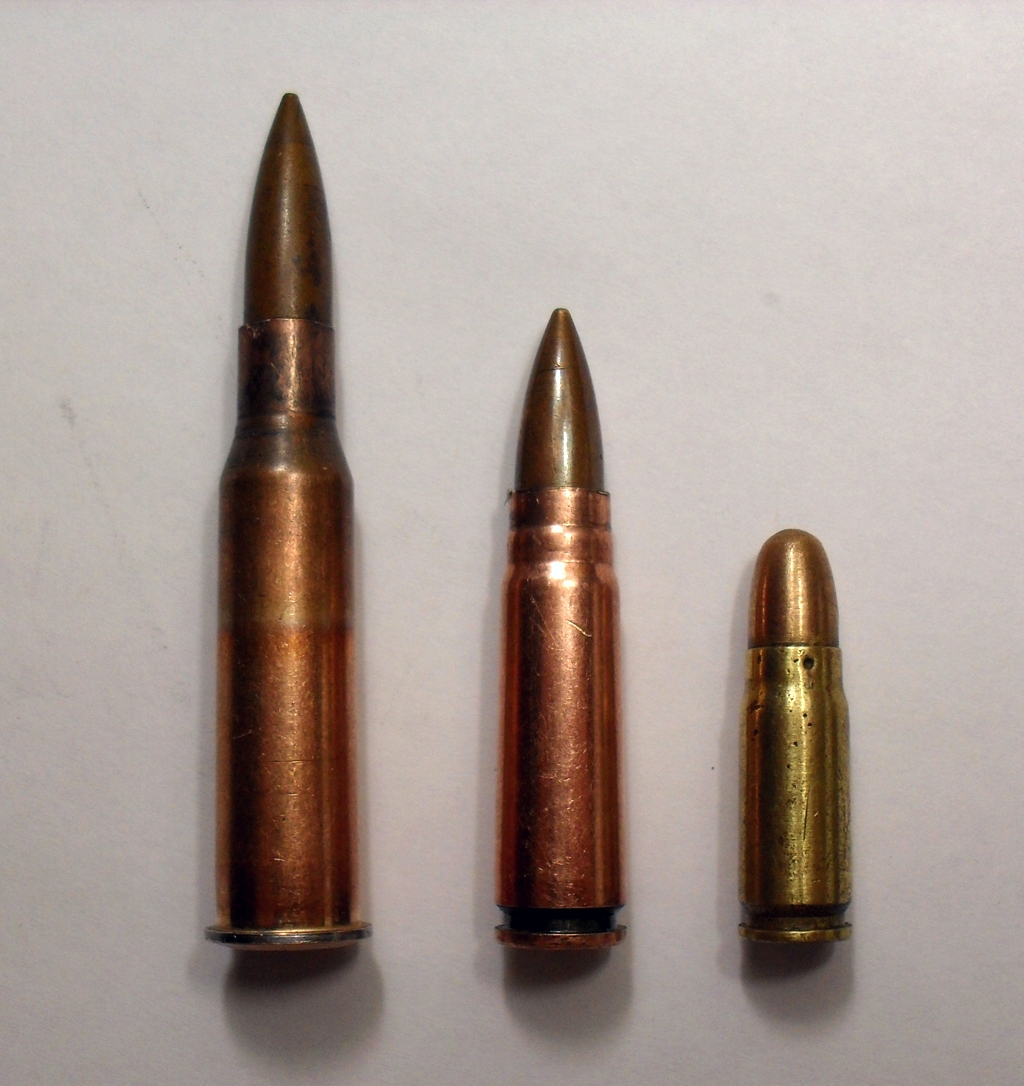
Soviet World War II-era service cartridges: (Left to right) 7.62×54mmR, 7.62×39mm, 7.62×25mm

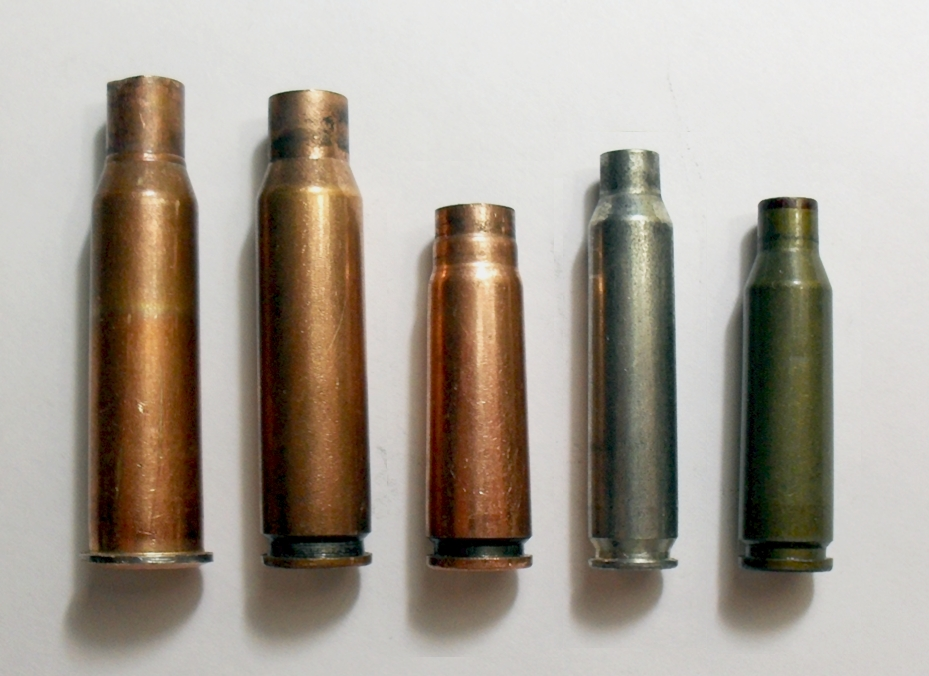
Modern service rifle cartridge cases: (Left to right) 7.62×54mmR, 7.62×51mm NATO, 7.62×39mm, 5.56×45mm NATO, 5.45×39mm

The 7.62×54mmR is a rimmed rifle cartridge developed by the Russian Empire and introduced as a service cartridge in 1891. Originally designed for the bolt-action Mosin–Nagant rifle, it was used during the late tsarist era and throughout the Soviet period to the present day. The cartridge remains one of the few standard-issue rimmed cartridges still in military use, and has one of the longest service lives of any military-issued cartridge.

The fully-powered 7.62×54mmR cartridge is still in use by the Russian military in the Dragunov (SVD), SV-98 and other sniper rifles, as well as some modern general-purpose machine guns like the PKM and Pecheneg machine gun. Originally, the round was designated Трехлинейный патрон образца 1891 года – (three-line cartridge model of 1891). It then became widely known under the designation 7,62мм винтовочный патрон (7.62 mm rifle cartridge). The round has erroneously come to be known as the "7.62mm Russian" (and is still often referred to as such colloquially), but, according to standards, the R in designation (7.62×54mmR) stands for "rimmed", in line with standard C.I.P. designations. The name is sometimes confused with the "7.62 Soviet" round, which refers to the rimless 7.62×39mm intermediate cartridge used in the SKS and AK-based (AK-47, RPK) rifles and light machine guns.

== Background ==
The 7.62×54mmR is the second-oldest cartridge still in regular combat service with several major armed forces in the world. It is second to the .303 British which entered military service in 1889 and remains in service, primarily in some noncombatant Commonwealth nations around the world. In 2021, the cartridge reached 130 years in service. As of December 2013 the 7.62×54mmR is mainly used in designated marksman and sniper rifles like the Dragunov sniper rifle, SV-98 and machine guns like the PKM. It is also one of the few (along with the .22 Hornet, .30-30 Winchester, and .303 British) bottlenecked, rimmed centerfire rifle cartridges still in common use today. Most of the bottleneck rimmed cartridges of the late 1880s and 1890s fell into disuse by the end of the First World War.

The .30-06 Springfield cartridge (7.62×63mm), with its higher service pressure and case capacity, will outperform the 7.62×54mmR when same-length test barrels are used, though this is very uncommon as .30-06 Springfield firearms are generally sold with much shorter barrels than 7.62×54mmR firearms. Commonly available 7.62×54mmR 150 gr (9.7 g) commercial ammunition chronographs around 3,000 ft/s (914 m/s) from the typical Mosin-Nagant (29-inch) barrel, while the heavier 180 gr (11.7 g) loads chonograph in the low 2,700 ft/s (823 m/s) range. This is identical to .30-06 Springfield performance from a 24-inch barrel and slightly better than .30-06 Springfield performance from a 22-inch barrel.

The 7.62×54mmR originally had a 13.7 g (210 grain) "jager" round-nosed full metal jacket (FMJ) bullet. The projectile was replaced in 1908 by the 9.61-gram (148.3 gr) Лёгкая Пуля (Lyogkaya pulya, "light bullet") spitzer bullet, whose basic design has remained to the present. The Lyogkaya pulya, or L-bullet, had a ballistic coefficient (G1 BC) of approximately 0.338 and (G7 BC) of approximately 0.185.

=== Sniper rounds ===
To increase accuracy for the Dragunov SVD, the Soviets developed the 7N1 variant of the cartridge in 1966. The 7N1 was developed by V. M. Sabelnikov, P. P. Sazonov and V. M. Dvorianinov. It used match-grade extruded powder instead of the coarser ball propellant and had a 9.8 g (151.2 gr) boat-tailed FMJ jacketed projectile with an air pocket, a steel core and a lead knocker in the base for maximum terminal effect. It had a ballistic coefficient (G1 BC) of approximately 0.411 and (G7 BC) of approximately 0.206. Produced by "Factory 188" (Novosibirsk Low Voltage Equipment Plant), cartridges are only head-stamped with the number "188" and the year of manufacture. It came packaged 20 loose rounds to a paper packet, 22 packets to a metal "spam" tin, and two tins per wooden case, for a total of 880 rounds. The individual paper packets, hermetically sealed metal 'spam' cans, and wooden shipping crates were all distinctly marked Снайперская (Snaiperskaya, the adjective form of "sniper"). Even the wax wrapping paper for the paper packets was covered in red text to make sure it was not misused.

As hard body armor saw increasing use in militaries, the 7N1 was replaced in 1999 by the 7N14 special load developed for the SVD. The 7N14 round is loaded with a 9.8 g (151.2 gr) projectile containing a sharp hardened steel penetrator to improve penetration which is fired with an average muzzle velocity of 830 m/s (2,723 ft/s), for a muzzle energy of 3,375 J (2,489 ft⋅lbf).

== Cartridge dimensions ==
The 7.62×54mmR has a 4.16 mL (64 gr H_{2}O) cartridge case capacity. The exterior shape of the case was designed to promote reliable case feeding and extraction in bolt-action rifles and machine guns alike, under challenging conditions.

7.62×54mmR maximum C.I.P. cartridge dimensions. All sizes in millimeters (mm).

Americans would define the shoulder angle at alpha/2 ≈ 18.5 degrees. The common rifling twist rate for this cartridge is 240 mm (1 in 9.45 in), 4 grooves, Ø lands = 7.62 mm (0.300 in), Ø grooves = 7.92 mm (0.312 in), land width = 3.81 mm and the primer type is Berdan or very rarely Boxer (in large rifle size).

According to the official C.I.P. (Commission Internationale Permanente pour l'Epreuve des Armes à Feu Portatives) rulings the 7.62×54mmR can handle up to 390.00 MPa (56,565 psi) P_{max} piezo pressure. In C.I.P.-regulated countries every rifle cartridge combo has to be proofed at 125% of this maximum C.I.P. pressure to certify for sale to consumers. This means that 7.62×54mmR-chambered arms in C.I.P.-regulated countries are currently (2014) proof tested at 487.50 MPa (70,706 psi) PE piezo pressure.

== Performance ==
The attainable muzzle velocities and muzzle energies of the 7.62×54mmR are comparable with standard 7.62×51mm NATO cartridges. However, a rimmed case such as the one used in the 7.62×54mmR cartridge can complicate smooth feeding within box magazines, but they are by no means unreliable.

When used with modern hunting bullets, the 7.62×54mmR is capable of taking game in the medium- to large-sized class (CXP2 and CXP3). The 7.62×54mmR can offer very good penetrating ability due to a fast twist rate that enables it to fire long, heavy bullets with a high sectional density. In Russia, the 7.62×54mmR is commonly used for hunting purposes, mostly in sporterized Mosin–Nagant rifles and civil Dragunov variants (Tigers).

=== Basic specifications of 21st century Russian service loads ===
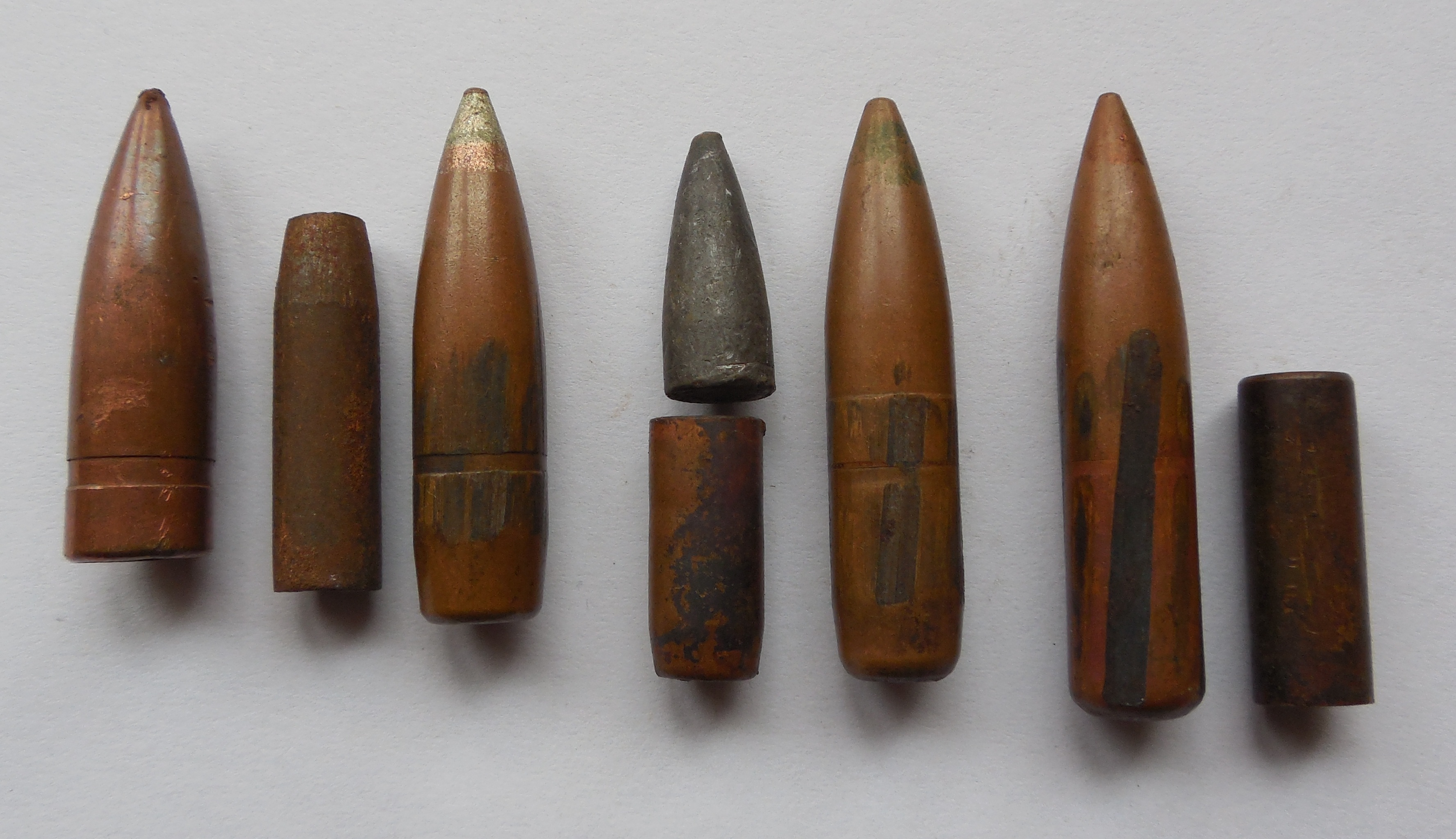
From left to right: L type bullet with lead core, LPS bullet with steel core aside, green tip T-46M tracer with tracer cup (opened both at top and bottom) and lead tip aside, T-46 tracer with extended cup (opened only at the bottom). All bullet jackets and tracer cups are made from copper washed steel.

The 7.62×54mmR rounds in use with the Russian Armed Forces are designed for machine guns and sniper rifles. As of 2003, there were several variants of 7.62×54mmR rounds produced for various purposes. All use clad metal as case material.

57-N-323S
A conventional steel-core bullet designed to engage personnel and weapon systems. The bullet has a steel core and has a ballistic coefficient (G1 BC) of approximately 0.374 and (G7 BC) of approximately 0.187. The tip has no distinguishing colour. It can penetrate a 6 mm (0.2 in) thick St3 steel plate at 520 m (569 yd) and 6Zh85T body armor at 110 m (120 yd).
7N13
An enhanced-penetration bullet designed to kill personnel wearing body armor, featuring a heat-strengthened core. The tip is uncoloured. A sealing lacquer belt on the mouth of the case is red-coloured. It can penetrate a 6 mm (0.2 in) thick St3 steel plate at 660 m (722 yd) and 6Zh85T body armor at 800 m (875 yd).
7T2
A variant of the T-46, a tracer bullet designed for fire adjustment and target designation. The bullet has a green tip, and the tracer burns for 3 seconds.
7BZ3
A variant of the B-32, an armor-piercing/incendiary bullet designed to defeat lightly armored targets. The bullet has a black-red tip.
7N1
A sniper round designed for improved accuracy. The tip of the bullet is uncoloured.

Cartridge designation	57-N-323S	7N13 (AP)	7T2 (tracer)	7BZ3 (API)	7N1 (sniper load)
Cartridge weight	21.8 g (336 gr)	21.7 g (335 gr)	22 g (340 gr)	22.6 g (349 gr)	21.9 g (338 gr)
Bullet weight	9.6 g (148.2 gr)	9.4 g (145.1 gr)	9.65 g (148.9 gr)	10.39 g (160.3 gr)	9.8 g (151.2 gr)
Muzzle velocity	828 m/s (2,717 ft/s)	828 m/s (2,717 ft/s)	798 m/s (2,618 ft/s)	809 m/s (2,654 ft/s)	823 m/s (2,700 ft/s)
Muzzle energy	3,291 J (2,427 ft⋅lbf)	3,222 J (2,376 ft⋅lbf)	3,073 J (2,267 ft⋅lbf)	3,400 J (2,508 ft⋅lbf)	3,319 J (2,448 ft⋅lbf)
Accuracy of fire at 300 m (328 yd)	90 mm (3.5 in) (R_{50})	90 mm (3.5 in) (R_{50})	150 mm (5.9 in) (R_{50})	150 mm (5.9 in) (R_{50})	80 mm (3.1 in) (R_{100})

- R_{50} at 300 m (328 yd) means the closest 50% of the shot group will all be within a circle of the mentioned diameter at 300 m (328 yd).
- R_{100} at 300 m (328 yd) means every shot of the shot group will be within a circle of the mentioned diameter at 300 m (328 yd).

== Availability ==
7.62×54mmR is widely available both as military surplus and new production, but less so for match-grade rounds. Most surplus ammunition is steel-cased and uses Berdan primers, which effectively hinders its use for handloading. However, with the increased popularity of surplus Eastern-bloc Mosin–Nagant, SVT-40, and PSL rifles in the United States, Boxer-primed ammunition and unfired cases are increasingly available; these cases take large rifle primers.

== Cartridge derivatives ==
=== USSR/Russia ===
Russia also produces similar derivative cartridges based on the original case dimensions of the 7.62x54mmR cartridge for hunting and sport.

- 6.5×54mmR: necked-down version, used in both converted Mosin biathlon rifles and Vostok-brand biathlon rifles in the 1960s and 1970.
- 9×53mmR: Russian hunting cartridge.
- 9.6×53mmR Lancaster: hunting cartridge.

=== Finland ===
In 1809, Finland had been absorbed by the Russian Empire after wars with Sweden. After Russia's adoption of the 1891 Mosin-Nagant rifle in 7.62x54mmR, Imperial armories in Finland had received stocks of the new rifle. When, in 1917 the Russian Empire fell, Finland declared independence in December and those armories became Finnish. Soon thereafter, and especially after World War 2, captured Russian and Finnish military surplus 7.62x54R rifles became available to Finnish sportsmen and subsistence hunters. At one point the Finnish Government became concerned that there were too many wounded and escaped game animals that had not been humanely and quickly taken using the surplus military ammunition. Particularly when hunting large game such as moose and bear. They banned the use of the 7.62x53mmR and 7.62x54mmR for such game. Finnish gunsmiths and cartridge companies then developed different derivative cartridges by "necking up" the case to accept larger diameter or "caliber" (therefore also heavier and harder hitting) bullets for more humane hunting of large game: the 8.2x53mmR and the 9.3x53mmR. Both bullet diameters or calibers were, and still are, common calibers for hunting rifles in Europe and much of the rest of the world.

- 7.62×53mmR: Finnish military cartridge. Considered identical to 7.62×54mmR by some manufacturers, but not by CIP due to bullet being specified as .308 vs .312 caliber.
- 8.2×53mmR: Finnish hunting cartridge.
- 9.3×53mmR: Finnish hunting cartridge. (see 7.62x53mmR)

== List of 7.62×54mmR firearms ==
=== Rifles ===
- 3,004 Berdan II rifles were converted to 7.62×54mmR for Russian service by arms makers in Belgium.
- The various Mosin–Nagant bolt-action rifles including the sawn-off "Obrez" pistol
- The American Winchester Model 1895. Approximately 300,000 made for the Russian army in 1915–16.
- AVB-7.62
- AVS-36
- Berkut-2M1
- Dragunov sniper rifle (including Chinese NDM-86 variant)
- IZH-18MH
- JS 7.62
- Winchester 1895 (7.62x54R ver)
- PSL sniper rifle
- Chukavin sniper rifle
- SVT-38 and SVT-40
- SV-98 (Snaiperskaya Vintovka Model 1998)
- Alejandro Sniper Rifle
- Dragunov SVU (1991 redesign of the Dragunov sniper rifle)
- Vepr sporting rifle
- MTs-13, 300m sporting rifle
- AVL, Service rifle lightweight, based on Los
- AV, Mosin based standard service rifle
- TsVR, Rekord, Rekord-1, Rekord CISM, KO-13—service rifle
- TsVT, Typhoon 300m sporting rifle
- CAVIM Catatumbo sniper rifle
- K-11 (sniper rifle)
- Zastava M91 sniper rifle

=== Machine guns ===
- 2B-P-10
- AEK-999
- Degtyaryov machine gun (DP28)/(RP-46)
- DS-39
- Gorov machine gun
- GShG-7.62 machine gun
- Hua Qing Minigun
- Madsen machine gun
- MG42 (Finnish conversion efforts)
- Odkolek machine gun
- PK machine gun (also known as PKM)
- PKP "Pecheneg" machine gun
- PM M1910
- PV-1 machine gun
- Slostin machine gun
- Savin-Narov machine gun
- SG-43 Goryunov
- ShKAS machine gun
- Type 53/57 machine gun
- Sosinsky 1906
- TKB-135
- TKB-264-42
- Type 67 machine gun and Type 80 machine gun.
- Type 73 light machine gun
- Uk vz. 59
- Zastava M84

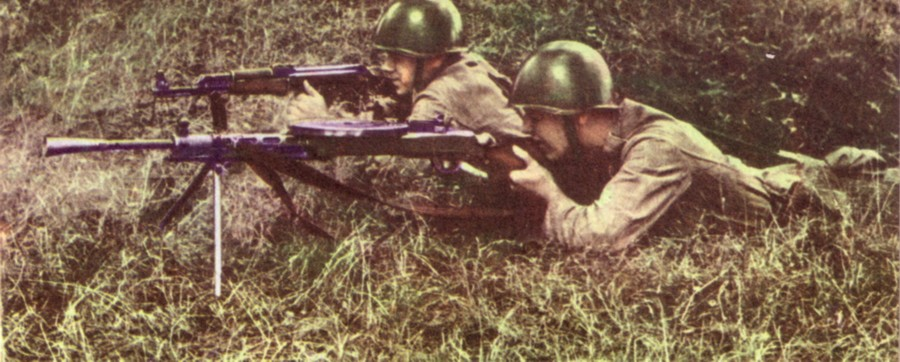
DP28 and AK-47

== Alternative names ==
While the only official nomenclature for the cartridge is 7.62×54R ("R" standing for "rimmed"), some shooters in the U.S. have confused the "R" as an abbreviation for "Russian" due to the round's origin.

- 7.62×54R
- 7.62 Russian
- 7.62 Mosin–Nagant
- 7.62 Dragunov
- 7.62 M91
- .30 Russian
- Rimmed Russian

== See also ==
- List of rimmed cartridges
- List of rifle cartridges
- Table of handgun and rifle cartridges
- 7.62 mm caliber
- 7.62×53mmR Finnish
