= Zagorsk Optical-Mechanical Plant =

Company based in Sergiyev Posad, Russia

Coordinates: 56°19′18″N 38°09′00″E

- Company type: Open joint stock company
- Founded: 1935
- Headquarters: Sergiyev Posad, Russia
- Parent: Shvabe Holding
- Website: zomz.ru

Zagorsk Optical-Mechanical Plant (Russian: Загорский оптико-механический завод) is a company based in Sergiyev Posad (formerly called Zagorsk), Moscow Oblast, Russia. It is part of Shvabe Holding of Rostec, a Russian state-owned defense conglomerate.

The Zagorsk Optical-Mechanical Plant is a producer of pyrotechnics and precision optical equipment for the military, such as active infrared night vision devices and binoculars. A report last updated in June 1994 stated that it had increased the proportion of its civilian production, and adapted some of its military products, such as night vision devices, to civilian use. On 8 June 2022, the plant experienced a fire, one of several unusual fires in 2022 in Russia.

On 9 August 2023, the plant experienced a massive explosion and was evacuated. After the blast, the governor in the region claimed that the factory was actually mainly manufacturing "pyrotechnics". Eyewitnesses claimed a drone struck the facilities shortly before the explosion. Russian state media blamed a nearby fireworks company, Piro Ross, for the incident. Piro Ross' CEO claimed no explosives were housed nearby. Forbes later considered the plant's explosion a possible contributor to delays in Russia's ZALA Lancet drone production.

== Management ==
Directors:

- CEO - Konstantin Gennadievich Pertsev.

== Awards ==
- January 18, 1971 — Order of the Red Banner of Labour
- November 18, 1985 — Order of the October Revolution
