= List of most-produced firearms =

This page lists more than 100 small arms designs which have been produced in numbers exceeding one million since the late 18th century. Many more types have been made in the hundreds of thousands. Many of the firearms on this list are military weapons which were used during both World Wars, so it is unsurprising that they were manufactured in such high numbers. Others are designed for civilian hunting and sport shooting, which generally sell very well in countries such as the U.S. and Canada. Many of those produced have been destroyed, deactivated or fallen into disrepair, but others have been kept in working order and sold or passed on from one generation to another down the years.

In 2018, Small Arms Survey reported that there are over one billion small arms distributed globally, of which 857 million (about 85 percent) are in civilian hands. U.S. civilians alone account for 393 million (about 46 percent) of the worldwide total of civilian-held firearms. This amounts to "120.5 firearms for every 100 residents." The world's armed forces control about 133 million (about 13 percent) of the global total of small arms, of which over 43 percent belong to two countries, the Russian Federation (30.3 million) and the People's Republic of China (27.5 million). Law enforcement agencies control about 23 million (about 2 percent) of the global total of small arms.

Estimates by Oxfam in 2012 put the production of firearm cartridges at 12 billion per year, or approximately 32.9 million a day. (Note: 12,000,000,000 ÷ 365.24 = 32,855,108.96944475, this figure is rounded to the nearest hundred thousand.)

Estimates of production of the Kalashnikov AK-47 and derivative weapons may be exaggerated. Various sources quote figures between 35 and 150 million. In his 2001 book 'The AK-47', Chris McNab claims it is "feasible" that production of the Chinese Type 56 assault rifle – a license-built AK-47 copy – reached 15-20 million. McNab bases that estimate on the "apparent" strength of the Chinese armed forces of 10 million (3 million regular troops and 5-7 million reservists) and presumed export sales. However, the true strength of the People's Liberation Army was around 1.5 million in 2013. Furthermore, as late as the 1979 Sino-Vietnamese war most Chinese soldiers were armed with another weapon, the Type 56 carbine (an SKS copy), and were soon after re-equipped with the Type 81 assault rifle, followed later by the QBZ-95 and QBZ-03, all of which are unrelated to the Kalashnikov design.

== Designs produced in numbers exceeding 1 million ==
Model or series	Class of firearm	Origin	Low estimate of production	High estimate of production (Note: Or the only estimate of production if there isn’t a reliable source with a lower estimate)	Notes
Kalashnikov AK-47 (and derivatives)	Assault rifle	Soviet Union	40,000,000	150,000,000	5 million milled AK type 3, 10 million AKM, 5 million AK-7415-20 million Chinese Type 56 3 million Yugoslav Zastava M70, 2 million East German Mpi Several million Egyptian Maadi
Mauser Gewehr 98 (and similar)	Bolt-action rifle	German Empire	20,000,000	102,000,000	
Mosin–Nagant	Bolt-action rifle	Russian Empire		37,000,000	
M16/M4/AR-15 and derivatives	Assault rifle/semi-automatic rifle	United States	15,000,000	20,000,000	10 million military M16/M4, (Colt production only as of 2011) 5-10 million civilian AR-15 (as of 2016)
Lee–Enfield	Bolt-action rifle	United Kingdom	16,000,000	17,000,000	
SKS	Semi-automatic rifle	Soviet Union	5,000,000	15,000,000	
Mossberg 500	Pump-action shotgun	United States	10,000,000	12,000,000	
Remington 870	Pump-action shotgun	United States	10,000,000	11,000,000+	
Marlin Model 60	Semi-automatic rifle	United States		11,000,000	
IMI Uzi	Submachine gun	Israel	2,000,000	10,000,000	
Arisaka Type 30/38/99	Bolt-action rifle	Japan	7,000,000	10,000,000	~560,000 Type 30, 3 million plus Type 38 3.5 million or more Type 99
Glock	Semi-automatic pistol	Austria	10,000,000	20,000,000	5 million sold by 2007 and 1 million in 2013 alone. 800,000+ imported into the US in 2012
Makarov pistol	Semi-automatic pistol	Soviet Union	5,000,000	10,000,000	5 million at the Izhevsk factory alone
M1 Garand	Semi-automatic rifle	United States		8,200,000	
Heckler & Koch G3	Battle rifle	West Germany		8,000,000	
Winchester Model 1894	Lever-action rifle	United States	6,000,000	7,500,000	
FN FAL (and derivatives)	Battle rifle	Belgium	5,000,000	7,000,000	2 million + Belgian FN FAL, 1.15 million British L1A1 1 million + Indian 1A1, 250,000 South African R1 (plus 30,000 sold to Rhodesia), 230,000 Australian L1A1 and L2A1 ~200,000 Brazilian IMBEL M964, ~150,000 Austrian StG 58, ~65,000 Canadian C1
Musket Model 1777	Musket	France		7,000,000	
M1/M2/M3 Carbine	Carbine Automatic carbine (M2/M3)	United States		6,500,000	
Type 63	Assault rifle	China	1,000,000	6,000,000	
PPSh-41	Submachine gun	Soviet Union	5,000,000	6,000,000	
Marlin Model 336	Lever-action rifle	United States		6,000,000	
Smith & Wesson Model 10	Revolver	United States		6,000,000	
Ruger 10/22	Semi-automatic rifle	United States	5,000,000	6,000,000	
Remington Model 700	Bolt-action rifle	United States		5,000,000	
Walther PP/PPK	Semi-automatic pistol	Germany		5,000,000	
M1911 (and copies)	Semi-automatic pistol	United States	3,000,000	5,000,000	2,700,000 military models (various contractors) ~500,000 civilian production by Colt Up to 2 million Spanish Star Model A/B/M/P? 113,000 Argentine Ballester-Molina
STEN gun	Submachine gun	United Kingdom	3,500,000	4,500,000	
Carcano Modello 1891	Bolt-action rifle	Italy	3,000,000	4,500,000	
'Brown Bess' Land Pattern Musket	Musket	United Kingdom	3,000,000	4,300,000	3 million India Pattern Short Land Carbine made from 1795 1.6 million made in Birmingham and 2.7 million in London
Remington Model 1100	Semi-automatic shotgun	United States	3,000,000	4,000,000	
Ruger Single Six/ Blackhawk/Vaquero	Revolver	United States		4,000,000	~1.5 million Single Six ~2 million Blackhawk ~650,000 Vaquero
Lebel Model 1886	Bolt-action rifle	France		3,500,000	
Beretta 92	Semi-automatic pistol	Italy		3,500,000	
Pattern 1914 Enfield (and derivatives)	Bolt-action rifle	United Kingdom	3,427,761	3,500,000	1,257 Pattern 1913 Enfield more than 1,000,000 Pattern 1914 Enfield more than 2,000,000 M1917 Enfield; ~28,000 Remington Model 30
Mannlicher M1895	Bolt-action rifle	Austria-Hungary	2,500,000	3,500,000	
Berdan M1870	Single-shot bolt-action rifle	Russian Empire		3,200,000	
Browning M2	Heavy machine gun	United States		3,000,000	
Ruger Standard	Semi-automatic pistol	United States	2,000,000	3,000,000	
Springfield M1903	Bolt-action rifle	United States		3,000,000	
Luger Parabellum	Semi-automatic pistol	German Empire	2,000,000	3,000,000	
Browning Auto-5	Semi-automatic shotgun	United States	2,000,000	3,000,000	Browning made its 2 millionth gun in 1974 Also produced as the Remington Model 11 and Savage Model 720 and 745
Nagant M1895	Revolver	Russian Empire	2,600,000	3,000,000+	
QBZ-95	Assault rifle	China		3,000,000	
Gewehr 1888	Bolt-action rifle	German Empire	2,000,000	2,800,000	
Remington Model 740/742/7400 Woodsmaster	Semi-automatic rifle	United States	1,700,000	2,500,000	
Fusil Gras mle 1874	Single-shot bolt-action rifle	France		2,500,000	
M14	Battle rifle	United States	1,530,000	2,380,000	1.38 million US M14 ~150,000 – 1 million Taiwanese T57
Marlin Model 1891, 1892, 1897 and 39	Lever-action rifle	United States		2,200,000	
M1917 Enfield	Bolt-action rifle	United States		2,193,429	
Berthier Models 1890-1907	Bolt-action rifle	France		2,000,000+	
Winchester Model 1912/42	Pump-action shotgun	United States		2,000,000	
Winchester Model 70/670/770	Bolt-action rifle	United States		2,000,000	
Winchester Model 1892 (and copies)	Lever-action rifle	United States		2,000,000	
Ruger M77	Bolt-action rifle	United States		2,000,000	
PPS-42/43	Submachine gun	Soviet Union		2,000,000	
Baikal/IMZ MP-27	Double-barrelled shotgun	Soviet Union	1,500,000+	2,000,000+	
Ithaca 37	Pump-action shotgun	United States		2,000,000	
Raven MP-25	Semi-automatic pistol	United States		2,000,000	
FN M1906/Colt M1908 Vest Pocket/ FN Baby Browning	Semi-automatic pistol	Belgium		2,000,000	
FN Model 1910, 1922 and Browning Model 1955	Semi-automatic pistol	Belgium	1,786,000	2,000,000	704,000 Model 1910, 486,000+ Model 1922, 619,000 Model 1955
Winchester Models 1900 — 68	Single-shot bolt-action rifle	United States	1,750,000	2,000,000	
Springfield Model 1861 and 1863	Rifle-musket	United States	1,500,000	2,000,000	1 million M1861 and 500,000-700,000 M1863 750,000 Model 1863 Type II
Ruger P-series	Semi-automatic pistol	United States	1,000,000	2,000,000	
Mauser Model 1871	Bolt-action rifle	German Empire		2,000,000	Over 1 million single-shot M1871 and 1.1 million magazine-fed M1871/84
'Chassepot' Fusil Modèle 1866	Single-shot rifle	France		2,000,000	
Winchester Model 1200/1300/120	Pump-action shotgun	United States		1,900,000	
Stevens Model 87	Semi-automatic rifle	United States	1,000,000	1,800,000	
Thompson submachine gun	Submachine gun	United States		1,700,000	
TT pistol	Semi-automatic pistol	Soviet Union		1,700,000	
SVT-38 and SVT-40	Semi-automatic rifle	Soviet Union	1,000,000+	1,600,000	
Winchester Model 1890 and 1906	Pump-action rifle	United States		1,600,000	
Colt Police Positive Special and Detective Special	Revolver	United States		1,500,000	
Beretta M1934 and M1935	Semi-automatic pistol	Italy		1,500,000	1 million plus Model 1934 525,000 Model 1935
Harrington & Richardson Young America Double Action	Revolver	United States		1,500,000	
Ruger Security-Six/ Speed Six/ Service Six	Revolver	United States	1,240,000	1,500,000	
Ruger LCP	Semi-automatic pistol	United States		1,500,000	
Browning Hi-Power	Semi-automatic pistol	Belgium	1,000,000	1,500,000	A BBC article claims 10 million. 650,000 may have been produced in Indian arsenals.
Remington Model 760/7600 Gamemaster	Pump-action rifle	United States	1,000,000	1,500,000	1,034,462 of the Model 760 alone were made from 1952-1980
Vetterli M1870	Bolt-action rifle	Italy		1,500,000	
Remington Rolling Block	Single-shot rifle	United States		1,500,000	
Pattern 1853 Enfield	Rifle-musket	United Kingdom		1,500,000	
MP 38 and MP 40	Submachine gun	Nazi Germany	1,100,000	1,500,000	
INSAS	Assault rifle	India	700,000	1,400,000	Based on strength of Indian army (1.3 million) and annual production rate. In service 1998-2017.
Schmidt–Rubin Model 1889 etc.	Bolt-action rifle	Switzerland		1,366,000	
Harrington & Richardson Model 2 Double Action	Revolver	United States		1,300,000	
Smith & Wesson N-frame (including models 27, 28 and 29)	Revolver	United States		1,300,000	333,454 S-prefix serial numbers 970,000 N-prefix serial numbers
Mannlicher M1886 and M1888	Bolt-action rifle	Austria-Hungary		1,200,000	
Walther P38	Semi-automatic pistol	Nazi Germany		1,173,000	WWII production alone
Smith & Wesson I-Frame (Model 30 & 31, Model 32 & 33 and Model 34 & 35)	Revolver	United States		1,169,000	Model 30 and 31: 826,977 Model 32 and 33: 122,678 Model 34 and 35: 219,801
Dreyse Needle Gun	Single-shot rifle	Prussia		1,150,000	
MAS-36	Bolt-action rifle	France		1,100,000	
Ruger Mini-14/AC556	Semi-automatic rifle	United States		1,000,000+	
CZ 75 series (B, Omega, SP-01 models)	Semi-automatic pistol	Czechoslovakia		1,000,000+	
Mauser C96 (and derivatives)	Semi-automatic pistol Machine pistol	German Empire		1,000,000+	920,000-984,000 C96, 98,000 M712 'Schnellfeuer' Tens of thousands of Spanish and Chinese copies
Beretta Model 38	Submachine gun	Italy		1,000,000	
Marlin Model 1894	Lever-action rifle	United States		1,000,000+	
Savage Model 99	Lever-action rifle	United States		1,000,000+	
PK machine gun	General-purpose machine gun	Soviet Union		1,000,000+	
Smith & Wesson M&P Shield	Semi-automatic pistol	United States		1,000,000+	1 million mark reached in December 2015
Henry Lever-Action .22	Lever-action rifle	United States		1,000,000+	Announced in December 2017
Remington Nylon 66	Semi-automatic rifle	United States		1,050,350	
Winchester Model 1897	Pump-action shotgun	United States		1,024,700	
Colt Army Special/Official Police/.357/Trooper/Lawman/Python	Revolver	United States		1,000,000	
DShK	Heavy machine gun	Soviet Union		1,000,000	
Vz. 58	Assault rifle	Czechoslovakia		1,000,000	
Taurus Millennium series	Semi-automatic pistol	Brazil		1,000,000	Nearly 1 million before 2015/16 recall, still in production
Daewoo Precision Industries K2	Assault rifle	South Korea		1,000,000	"Nearly a million" in 2017, still in production and being exported
FN Browning M1900	Semi-automatic pistol	Belgium	724,550	1,000,000	
Martini-Henry	Single-shot rifle	United Kingdom	500,000	1,000,000	
Total			390 million	645 million	

== Designs produced in numbers from 100,000 to 1,000,000 ==
Model or series	Class of firearm	Origin	Low estimate of production	High estimate of production	Notes
Gabilondo Ruby (and similar)	Semi-automatic pistol	Spain	700,000	900,000	The term "Ruby" is often also applied to "Ruby-style" pistols produced by 45 companies other than Gabilondo and its official partners.
Degtyaryov machine gun	Light machine gun	Soviet Union		792,000	
Krag-Jørgensen Rifle	Bolt-action rifle	Norway	748,500<	+750,000	Official rifle of the US military from 1892-4 until 1904.
Ruger GP100	Revolver	United States		734,500	
Colt 1903/1908 Pocket Hammerless	Semi-automatic pistol	United States		710,000	572,215 in .32 ACP and 138,009 in .380 ACP
Winchester Model 1873	Lever-action rifle	United States		702,000	
SIG SG 510	Battle rifle	Switzerland		700,000	
MAT-49	Submachine gun	France		700,000	
Colt Woodsman	Semi-automatic pistol	United States		690,000+	
Lorenz rifle	Rifle-musket	Austrian Empire		688,000	
Werndl–Holub rifle	Single-shot rifle	Austria-Hungary		686,000	
Model 1816 Musket	Musket	United States		675,000	
M3 submachine gun	Submachine gun	United States		655,363	
SA80	Assault rifle	United Kingdom		600,000	
SIG SG 550	Assault rifle	Switzerland		600,000	
MG 34	General-purpose machine gun	Nazi Germany		577,120	
Browning M1917 and M1919	Machine gun	United States		567,340	
Tula-Korovin TK	Semi-automatic pistol	Soviet Union		500,000	
Colt Single Action Army	Revolver	United States		457,000	357,000 from 1873 to 1940. 100,000 from 1956 to 1978. Still in production
M1879/M1883 Reichsrevolver	Revolver	German Empire		450,000	About 50,000 M1879; about 400,000 M1883.
StG 44	Assault rifle	Nazi Germany		425,000	
MG 42	General-purpose machine gun	Nazi Germany		423,600	
Ross Rifle	Bolt-action rifle	Canada		420,000	
Vektor R4	Assault rifle	South Africa		420,000	
Gewehr 43	Semi-automatic rifle	Nazi Germany		402,713	
FAMAS F1/G1/G2	Assault rifle	France	400,000	410,000	400,000 F1 pattern, used by the French Army. The French Navy have about 10,000-15,000 G2. Still in use.
Type 14 Nambu pistol	Semi-automatic pistol	Japan		400,000	
Fusil Gras mle 1874	Bolt-action rifle	France		400,000	
Colt New Service	Revolver	United States		356,000	
M1918 Browning Automatic Rifle	Automatic rifle	United States		351,679	
Lee–Metford	Bolt-action rifle	United Kingdom		350,000	
Colt Model 1849 Pocket	Revolver	United States		350,000	
Modèle 1892 revolver	Revolver	France		350,000	
MAC Mle 1950	Semi-automatic pistol	France		341,900	
MAS 1873 revolver	Revolver	France		337,000	
Bodeo Model 1889	Revolver	Italy		300,000	Tipo A enlisted version only.
M1917 revolver	Revolver	United States		300,000	
Steyr M1912	Semi-automatic pistol	Austria-Hungary		300,000	
Pistolet modèle An XIII	Flintlock pistol	France		300,000	
MAS-49	Semi-automatic rifle	France		295,840	
Chauchat	Light machine gun	France		262,000	
Heckler & Koch G36	Assault rifle	Germany	260,000+	500,000+	
TEC-9	Semi-automatic pistol	United States		257,434	
Colt Model 1851 Navy	Revolver	United States		257,000	
Howa Type 64	Battle rifle	Japan		230,000	
FX-05 Xiuhcoatl	Assault rifle	Mexico	212,000+		
Lewis gun	Light machine gun	United Kingdom		202,050	
Colt Model 1860 Army	Revolver	United States		200,500	
MAB Model D pistol	Semi-automatic pistol	France		200,000+	
Škorpion vz. 61	Submachine gun	Czechoslovakia		200,000	
FM 24/29 light machine gun	Light machine gun	France		190,400	
Rast & Gasser M1898	Revolver	Austria-Hungary		180,000	
Colt Model 1877 Lightning	Revolver	United States		166,849	
Winchester Model 1866	Lever-action rifle	United States		157,625	
FN Model 1903	Semi-automatic pistol	Belgium		153,173	
Model 1795 Musket	Musket	United States		150,000	
Colt Diamondback	Revolver	United States		130,000	
Webley Revolver	Revolver	United Kingdom		125,000	
Beretta AR70/90	Assault rifle	Italy		120,000	
Colt Open-Top Pocket	Revolver	United States		114,200	
