= Gunsmith =

Person who repairs, modifies, designs, or builds firearms

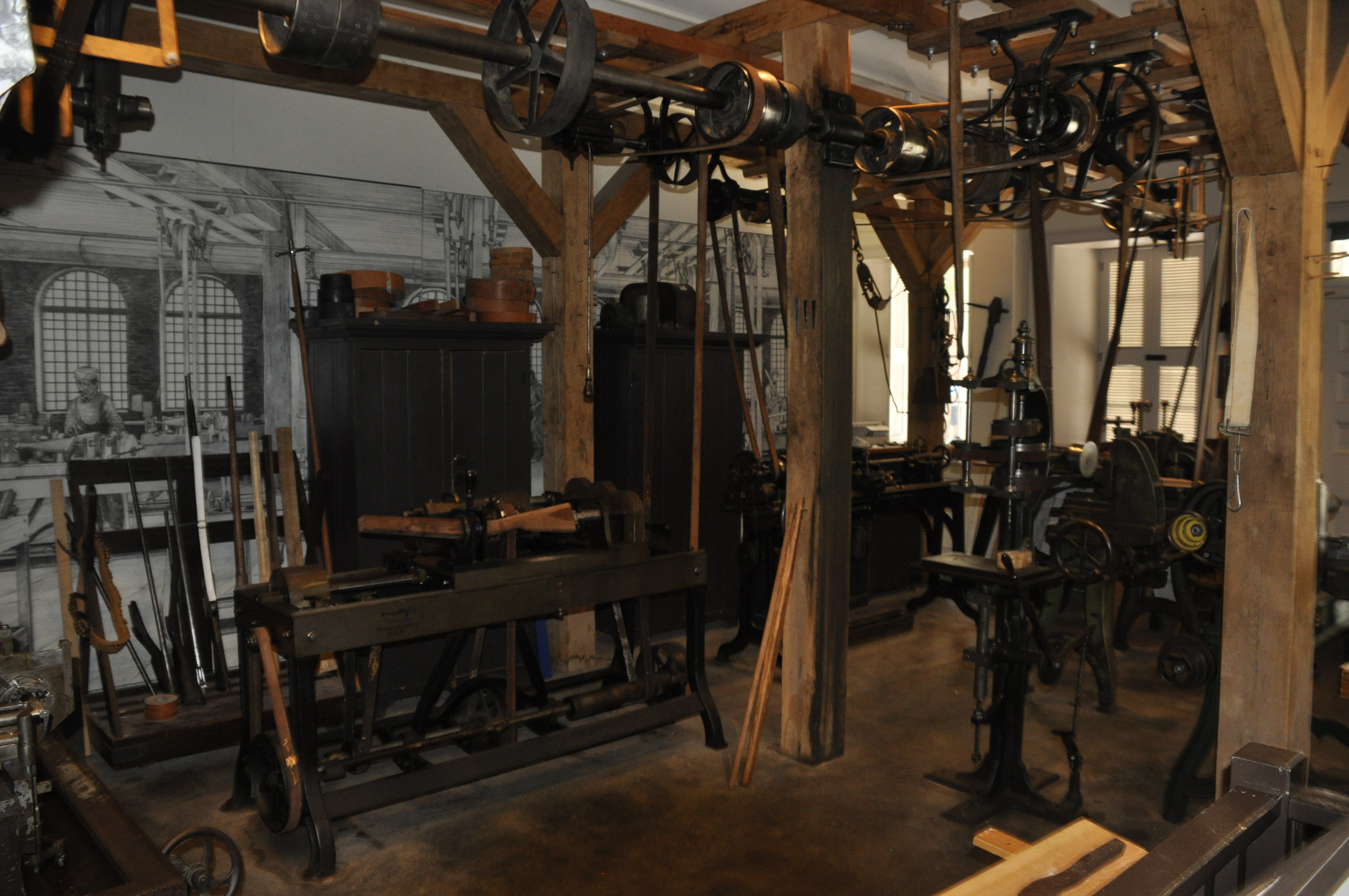
Re-creation of part of a gun shop in Harpers Ferry Armory from the 1850s (photo circa 2015)

A gunsmith is a person who repairs, modifies, designs, or builds guns. The occupation differs from an armorer, who usually replaces only worn parts in standard firearms. Gunsmiths do modifications and changes to a firearm that may require a very high level of craftsmanship, requiring the skills of a top-level machinist, a very skilled woodworker, and even an engineer. Gunsmiths perform factory-level repairs and renovations to restore well-used or deteriorated firearms to new condition. They may make alterations to adapt sporting guns to better fit the individual shooter that may require extensive modifications to the firearm's stocks and metal parts. Repairs and redesigns may require fabrication and fitting of unavailable parts and assemblies constructed by smiths themselves. Gunsmiths may also renew metal finishes or apply decorative carvings or engravings to guns. Many gun shops offer gunsmithing services on the premises.

== Overview ==
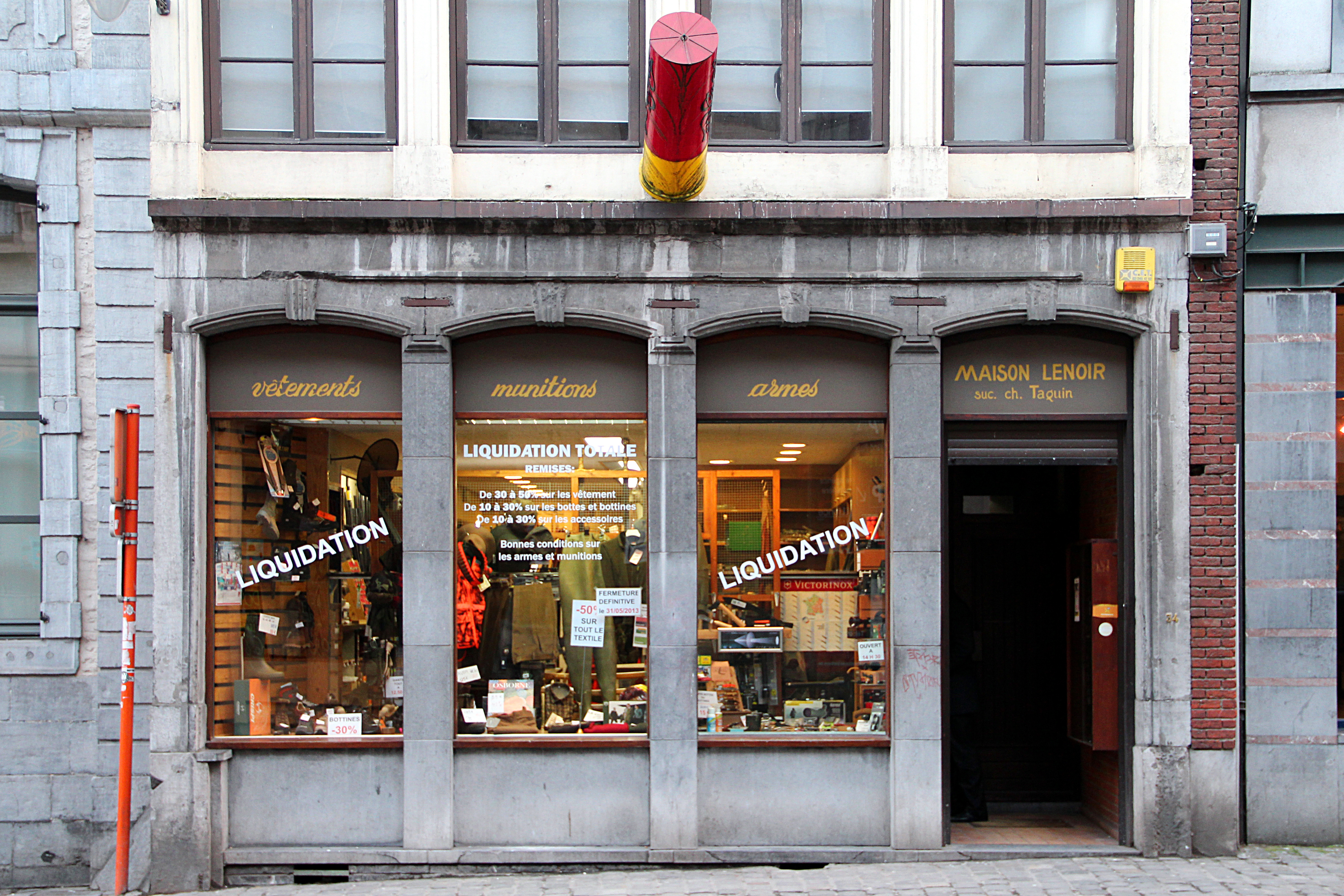
Gun shop located in Mons, Belgium

Gunsmiths may be employed in armories by military or law-enforcement agencies, sporting goods stores, or small gunsmith shops, as either the owner, or as one of several of employees.

To pursue the entirety of this trade, a gunsmith must possess skills as a parts fabricator, a metalworker or blacksmith, a woodworker and an artisan; be knowledgeable in shop mathematics, ballistics, chemistry, and materials engineering; be knowledgeable in the use and application of a variety of hand, power, and machinists tools and measuring devices. Those who are (self-) employed in small gunsmith shops must also possess skills as small business operators; work effectively with a wide variety of customers; and remain compliant with local legislation.

Due to the great breadth of subject matter to be mastered, many gunsmiths specialize in only a few of the skills required of the general gunsmith. Alternatively, some gunsmiths learn many of the skills of the trade but only apply them to a few weapon types (e.g., only pistols, only shotguns, only specific brands or models).

== Responsibilities ==
The primary responsibility of a gunsmith is to ensure that guns work and function safely. Gunsmiths accomplish this by always properly observing and demonstrating gun safety in their handling procedures, both in their own actions and the actions of their customers and the people around them.

They accomplish that task secondly by inspecting guns to ensure safe mechanical operation. Gunsmiths use their in-depth knowledge of firearms and manufacturer's gun schematics to guide inspections: repairing deficiencies, notifying customers of unsafe conditions, or preventing catastrophic failures.

Some of the conditions a gunsmith looks for when inspecting a firearm brought to them for repairs are improper assembly, missing parts, cracks, bore obstruction, improper headspace, improper timing, safety malfunctions, worn sear edges, and deformed firing pin tips, among other problems.

*Gun schematics, also referred to as firearm schematics, are technical diagrams that display a firearm's internal workings and parts. These schematics usually feature detailed illustrations of significant components like the barrel, receiver, trigger assembly, and magazine. They are often used by gun enthusiasts, manufacturers, and gunsmiths to diagnose and fix problems that may arise with the firearm.

== Common tasks ==
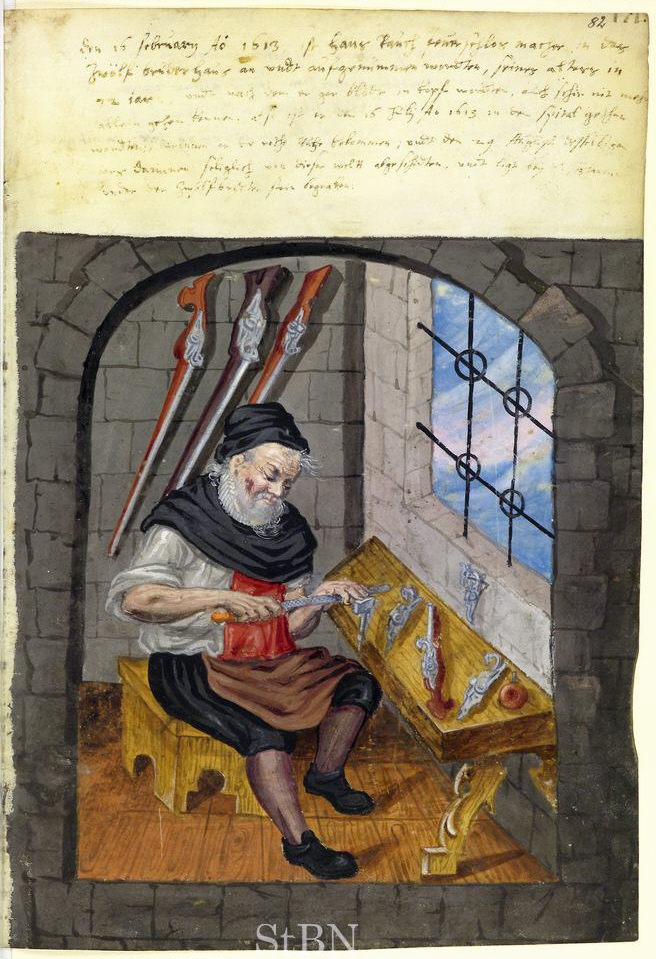
A gunsmith at work, 1613

(listed in approximate, but not exact, order of increasing difficulty)

- Disassemble, clean, inspect, lubricate and reassemble.
- Remove corrosion and touch-up finish.
- Repair burred or damaged parts with files and stones.
- Replace defective parts with factory-made replacements, hand-fitting as necessary.
- Add after-market customizations:
  - sling-swivels
  - recoil-pads
  - iron-sights
  - scopes
  - grip caps
  - butt plates
- Repair and re-finish wooden stock parts.
- Checker or re-checker grip areas.
- Deepen or clean up worn or damaged engravings and markings.
- Re-crown damaged muzzles on a lathe.
- Repair dented shotgun barrels.
- Install (solder) or repair rib on shotgun barrels, or repair double-barrel assemblies.
- Measure and correct head-space dimensions.
- Check for excessive bore erosion.
- Troubleshoot and repair feeding, ejecting and firing problems.
- Test-fire guns with conventional loads to ensure proper operation.
- Fabricate wooden stocks to customer specifications and body dimensions. Fit same to existing receiver and barrel.
- Glass-bed actions to stocks to improve accuracy.
- Remove existing metal finish, and re-blue metal parts.
- Fabricate replacement parts from metal stock.
- Modify trigger-pull weight through careful stoning of trigger mechanism parts.
- Fire proof-loads through weapons to ensure sufficient strength of parts under over-load conditions.
- Replace worn barrels which have fired so many rounds that they are no longer of the specified caliber (which leads to loss of accuracy).
- Change caliber or cartridge of existing rifle, by changing barrel, and modifying receiver.
- Re-cut rifling and change caliber of existing barrel.
- Design and build complete rifles by fitting stock barrels to stock receivers; fabricating or purchasing additional parts as needed, and fitting same to rifle. Fitting custom stock to the same.
- Design and build a complete rifle, shotgun, or combination gun from start to finish.

Top-end custom gunmaking:

A good example of a firearm type requiring the skills of a master gunsmith is a combination gun. These are highly complex hand-made long guns with several joined barrels. These are firearms that combine both rifle and shotgun barrels sharing a common breech and buttstock. Since these are completely hand-crafted by master gunsmiths, these can be made in almost any combination of rifle calibers and shotgun gauges. The most popular arrangement is a side-by-side shotgun with a high-power rifle barrel underneath with various firing mechanisms housed in a common breech.

Another firearm type demanding the highest skill levels is the completely custom-made side-by-side or over-and-under double barrel shotgun. These "doubles" are referred to in the British gunmaking trade as "bespoke" firearms and are referred to as "best guns". Their starting prices are commonly in the $150,000.00 (US) {2024 pricing} range, with customer-specified changes adding to the cost. Close examination of any examples of these rarified firearms by one knowlegable in this field will show why these firearms are priced in this range. It is some of the highest level of wood gunstock blank selection, shaping, and fitting combined with flawless metal crafting. These firearms are commonly also hand engraved to a level of artistic design, layout, and execution that rivals (or surpasses) the finest printing plates used in currency printing. These firearms overall are time intensive in their execution and demand the highest quality workmanship as the customers purchasing these arms are invariably highly knowledgeable and communicate within their select group. Less than the finest work will become quickly known and this customer base will abandon any future business with that gunmaker. The highest level of custom-made firearms usually start out as several pieces of blank steel stock or rough forged parts, a slab (stock blank) of walnut; steel tubes with rifled or smooth holes ("bores") drilled their length. Many smaller detail parts are fabricated in-house and are fitted by the maker. The highly skilled gunsmiths that craft these masterpieces commonly use nothing more than an occasional lathe or milling machine for roughing the parts to their final fitting stages plus a heat treating furnace for making springs, hardening parts to the proper hardness, and color case hardening. But the majority of roughing, fitting, and finishing is done completely by hand using files, scrapers, abrasive paper and cloth, woodcarving chisels and rasps.

== Specializations ==
While some gunsmiths are general practitioners in this trade, some of the more important specializations are:

=== Custom builder/designer ===
A custom designer builds guns that are tailored to a customer's specification. Gunsmiths specializing in custom designs may be desirable for professional target-shooters and avid sports shooters. A custom gunsmith may work in partnership with engravers and artists to produce unique finishes and decorations not possible on mass-produced firearms. In addition to a proficiency with gunsmithing, additional expertise in firearm finishing and machining may be needed to manufacture the required components and springs prior to assembly.

=== Finisher ===
Applies various chemical processes (browning, bluing, Parkerization, among others) to the metal parts of guns to develop corrosion resistant surface layers on the steel. They may also apply case hardening to low carbon steel parts. Case hardening is a combined chemical and heat-treatment process which introduces carbon into the surfaces of low steel alloys that does not contain sufficient carbon to allow total ("through") heat treatment. This carbon rich surface is then heat treated resulting in a thin, very hard surface layer with a tough, malleable core. This process can be done solely for the mechanical properties (hardness and toughness) it imparts, or, by packing the parts in bone charcoal and other chemicals and heating in a heat treatment furnace for varying time periods, it is possible to introduce rich colors into the carbonized surface. This type of case hardening, known as color case hardening, and is prized for its rich mottled blues, purples, browns and grey tones. It is possible, with highly skilled craftsmen using proprietary processes, to control the hues and patterns so closely that one familiar with high grade custom firearms can usually recognize the maker of another shooter's firearm solely by the colors and patterns on its parts; an important distinction on extremely costly firearms of the highest grade. Typically, its use is usually restricted to receivers and non- stressed small parts. Although providing corrosion resistance, the colored surface layers are subject to wear and may also fade with time. Antique firearms for sale frequently note the specific percentage of the factory original case coloring remaining on the receiver and lockplates. Renewing this color case hardening to the specific patterns of the firearm when it was new has become an important sub-area of the gunsmithing field.

=== Stockmaker ===
Carves gun stocks from wood (usually walnut; although birch, maple, and apple wood, among others, are frequently seen). Fits stocks to the metal parts of the gun (receiver and barrel), as well as to customer's body dimensions. With custom made shotguns, the fit to the individual shooter is vital, as the shot cloud's impact is largely determined by the way the stock fits the shooter. Very high grade firearms may have stocks fashioned from very costly blanks, mostly of one of the walnut varieties, specially chosen for its rare and highly figured grain. The fashioning of high end gunstocks calls for an extremely high level of skill and craftsmanship, as the finished product must be pleasing aesthetically, fit the shooting customer like an orthopedic device, all the while having the ability to withstand high levels of recoil from the firing of many thousands of rounds. Wood gunstocks may be fashioned with automated machinery (for production firearms) while high end gunstocks are hand made using saws, chisels, gouges, rasps, and files. The surfaces are then finished by sanding, scraping, staining, oiling, or lacquering.

=== Checkerer ===
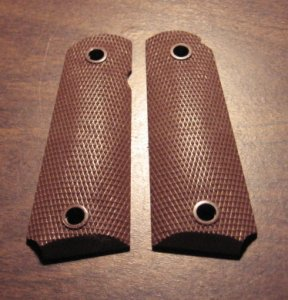
Simulated checkering on plastic pistol grips.

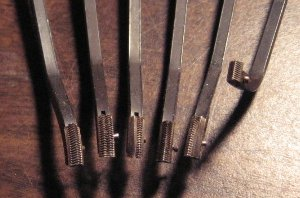
Checkering tools, showing tiny saw-teeth used to create v-grooves.

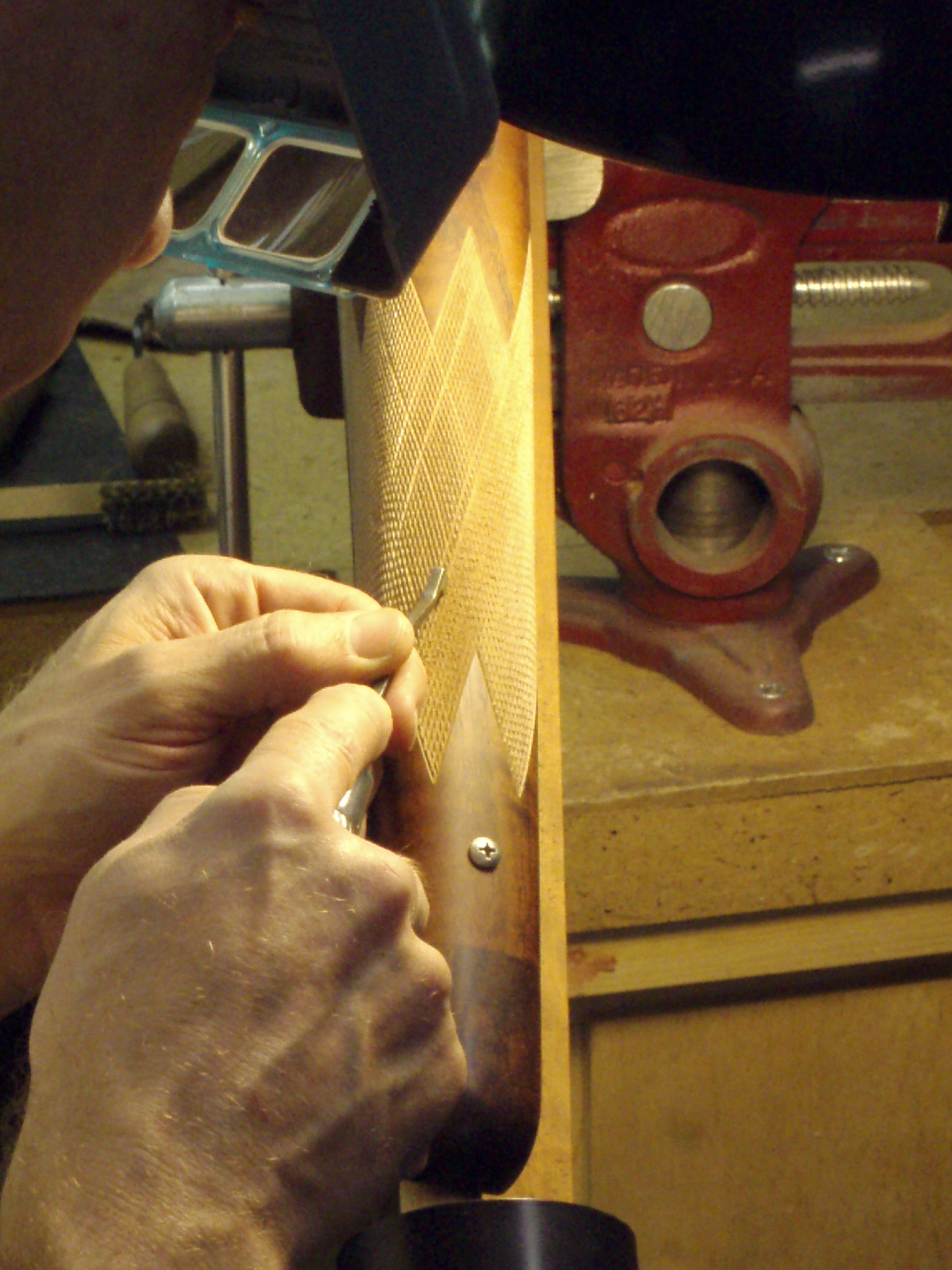
A gunsmith checkering the fore-end of a rifle.

(This specialization is frequently combined with that of the Stockmaker) Uses checkering tools to create an ornate pattern of small raised diamonds in the wood surfaces which are to be gripped. The checkering tools are in effect tiny saws, designed to leave a v-shaped groove (of approximately 60 to 90 degrees) in the surface of the wooden gunstock. Special checkering tools consisting of two saw blades in parallel are used to set the spacing, usually between 16 and 24 lines per inch (1.0 mm to 1.6 mm line width). The area to be checkered is covered by one set of such grooves parallel to each other. A second set of parallel grooves is then executed across the first set, at approximately a 30-degree angle, leaving the area covered with small, pointed diamonds. The edges of the checkered area are frequently ornamented with simple bas-relief wood carving, frequently variations on the fleur-de-lis.

=== Gun engraver ===
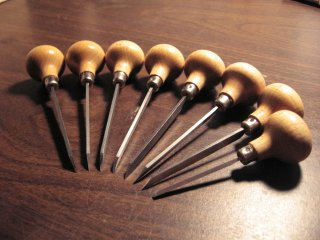
Hand Gravers: hand-powered tools to engrave metal.

Uses hand-gravers or die-sinker's chisels to cut designs or pictures into the metal surfaces of the gun, primarily the receiver. In many cases, a design is created with approval from the client. The design may incorporate a scene, an animal, humans and/or residences.

These designs are then cut freehand into the hardened steel surfaces of the firearm. Pneumatically driven engraving systems, such as the Gravermeister, developed by GRS Tools, may be used to replace or supplement hand-powered engraving, but the guiding of these powered tools is still provided by the artist. Other metals (especially gold and silver) may be inlaid and engraved to further the design. Designs usually consist of elaborate scroll-work based upon Acanthus leaves or vines, or may be of purely abstract spirals. Before the development of corrosion resistant surface treatments for steel, gun surfaces were engraved to retain more oil to prevent rust. In modern usage, guns are engraved purely for artistic reasons. Top grade engraving is very expensive but well executed, tastefully designed engraving always adds significantly to the value of quality firearms. Many of the world's foremost art museums have highly decorated firearms in their collections because of the high artistic merit and craftsmanship of their engraved, chiseled, and carved decoration. Many books exist on the subject of highly decorated firearms, with detailed illustrations showing their "art in steel".

=== Pistolsmith ===
Specializes in work on pistols and revolvers. Pistolsmiths should be proficient in a range of skills such as woodworking, checkering, machining, metal finishing and metalworking. They must have an excellent understanding of the mechanical characteristics and function of the guns they work on. Often a pistolsmith is called on for extensive customization of a handgun making it better suited for its intended purpose. A good example of this is changing the factory sights for new front and rear sights more suited to the purposes of the user. A wide variety is available as aftermarket parts. Target pistols usually start out as standard models but receive extensive reworking by skilled pistolsmiths resulting in a firearm that is capable of much greater accuracy than the standard versions of the same arm. A more advanced job a pistolsmith may called on to perform is to construct a completely hand fitted target arm using a serial numbered frame as the base (as required by law) with the rest of the parts supplied with excess metal in certain areas by specialist manufacturers so the pistolsmith can fit these parts together to exacting tolerances. Using these methods, the pistolsmith can build highly accurate firearms that greatly exceed the usual accuracy of standard models of the same model.

=== Manufacturer ===
Some gunsmiths used their experience and skills to become small-operation manufacturers, specializing in making only a few types of gun parts, for sale to other gunsmiths and gunmakers. Some of the more important part categories are barrels, trigger assemblies, receivers, and locks.

== Training and education ==
In general, gunsmiths develop and expand their skills through years of experience.

Some common ways to get started in gunsmithing include:

- Community colleges and correspondence courses offer various courses of study (less than two years long) leading to a degree or a certification. Well-known schools offering training in the trade include the Murray State College gunsmithing program, the Pennsylvania Gunsmith School, the Trinidad State Junior College Gunsmithing program, and the Yavapai College Gunsmithing School
- Military training: This is usually at the "Armorer" level, but some, notably the Army Marksmanship Unit (AMU) may have individuals specializing in Sniper or Service Match (Target Competition) arms. These highly gunsmithed ("Accurized") rifles and pistols are derived from standard service models and are used in target shooting and combat marksmanship roles.
  - The United States Army trains and employs MOS 45B – Small Arms Repairmen. (was redesignated MOS 91F in Spring of 2004)
  - The U.S. Air Force trains and employs Combat Arms Instructors (Firearms instructors and small arms repairers)AFSC(MOS) 3P0X1B.
  - The U.S. Marine Corps trains and employs MOS 2111 and MOS 2112.
  - The United States Navy trains and employs gunner's mates (GM).
- Apprenticeships, learning directly from professional gunsmiths:
- The National Rifle Association of America offers short courses in many common tasks and skills of professional gunsmithing. It also sponsors educational programs such as the one at Lassen College in Susanville, CA, and most notable at Trinidad State Junior College in Trinidad CO.

Basic machinist skills, while not limited to gunsmithing, are of great help to aspiring gunsmiths. These may include both machine and hand-tool operations, such as metal turning, drilling, filing, stoning or polishing.

Skilled gunsmiths may gain clients through word of mouth based on the quality of their work. Some gunsmiths charge higher prices or have long waitlists for their services.

== Legal requirements ==
In many countries of the world, the possession and ownership of firearms by civilians is highly restricted or outright illegal. The practice of gunsmithing is therefore typically restricted, licensed or regulated. In some circumstances the only legal firearms-related repairs are by individuals trained and employed by the military or police. These individuals are known as armorers. Typically, their skill level is usually far below that of the private or artisan gunsmith. Where the gunsmith frequently has to design, manufacture and fit parts ranging from small internal parts and assemblies, the armorer usually only has to replace standard interchangeable parts belonging to only one type, series, or family of military-related firearms. They typically are furnished a large inventory of standard parts that are known to wear and cause malfunctions in the weapons they will encounter, and they are simply trained to replace these items until satisfactory function is restored.

In the regions where ownership is permitted but limited or restricted to those individuals able to afford the costs of acquiring and owning a firearm, the firearms that are allowed tend to be fewer in number and possess levels of craftsmanship and decoration that approach that of an art object instead of simply a device to expel a projectile. Gunsmithing in these regions (as in Germany and Britain) is concerned with the hand-crafting of completely custom-made firearms tailored to the requirements of the owner.

=== Federal Republic of Germany ===
Germany has a tradition of hunting, but this is generally a complicated undertaking that limits its participation. Firearms possession is highly regulated by the police, and most hunters own only one long gun and perhaps a single pistol. One of Germany's more distinctive firearm developments is the drilling, a multi-barrel gun that may incorporate a double-barreled shotgun above with a high-powered single-shot barrel below. These typically have highly sophisticated breech mechanisms, precise fitting, and are hand-engraved by artists specializing in this work. The stocks are usually fitted to the individual and are very expensive wood with highly figured grain.

=== Italy ===
Firearms ownership in Italy is regulated by the Italian government but private ownership of various types and numbers of firearms is allowed after proper vetting of the prospective purchaser. Italy has a hunting tradition dating back several centuries. It is the location of some of the finest upland (game bird) hunting in the world. Italy also has a rich history of gunmaking and gunsmithing going back several hundred years with the production of matchlock, flintlock, and caplock rifles and pistols. The city of Brescia, Italy and specifically its suburb of Gardone Val Trompia is historical home to a number of firearm manufacturers and gunsmiths. Italy is noted as one of the world's leading manufacturing centers of custom-made highly crafted double shotguns. The city of Gardone is the home of several manufacturing firms that sell their products worldwide, with Pietro Beretta (founded in 1526) being the largest and best known. Italian shotguns are noted for their precise fitting, their precision craftsmanship, and the higher grades feature exquisite hand engraving. The Brescia area has several training facilities for the education of apprentices gunsmiths for the crafting of high grade shotguns and rifles. There is also a training academy for engravers and many freelance engravers are located in this area.

=== Japan ===
During the Tokugawa period in Japan, starting in the 17th century, the government imposed very restrictive controls on the small number of gunsmiths in the nation, thereby ensuring the almost total prohibition of firearms. Japan, in the postwar period, has had gun regulation which is strict in principle. Gun licensing is required, and is heavily regulated by the National Police Agency. The weapons law begins by stating "No one shall possess a firearm or firearms or a sword or swords", and very few exceptions are allowed. In recent times, there been moves to recruit more legally licensed and trained hunters to help control feral pigs. These animal's proliferation and their feeding characteristics has had negative effects on food crop planting and production.

Japan has many small companies that have undertaken the manufacture of hunting arms for many U.S. retailers. Browning Arms, some models of Winchester firearms, and the Weatherby rifle line are currently manufactured in Japan. Their products are known for very good craftsmanship, excellent material quality, and affordable pricing.

=== United Kingdom ===
The United Kingdom makes some of the most expensive hand-crafted firearms in the world, despite a highly restrictive ownership environment. Decoration of these arms, typically double-barreled shotguns, is on par with the plates used to mint currency and is priced about the same. Several of the other European countries follow this pattern, as in Italy, where the art of the gunsmith has also reached a high level of sophistication. These craftsmen may specialize as in the case of the gun engraver and stockmaker. Generally, these craftsmen serve long apprenticeships under master gunmakers. They may also be members of Guilds which set up apprentice programmes (often sponsored by the Governments in these countries as highly crafted firearms are important items in the export trade), supervise training, and conduct exams where the journeyman-level gunsmiths submit sample firearms of their own work in order to be admitted the Guild membership. Many of these can only be regarded as "gunmakers" instead of gunsmiths, and do repairs only on the very highest grade firearms. Many are able to make a substantial livelihood.

=== United States ===
In the United States, the Bureau of Alcohol, Tobacco, Firearms and Explosives (ATF) is the primary federal agency overseeing all legitimate businesses that deal with firearms, with the exception of firearms made before January 1, 1899, or muzzle loading firearms. The ATF is in charge of the licensing of all legitimate firearms dealers and gunsmiths in the US that engage in business with the public. The issuance of a Federal Firearms License (FFL) involves a thorough background investigation and an inspection of the gunsmith's premises by an Agent of the ATF. The ATF requires all gunsmiths to record all repairs, noting the serial numbers, type of firearm, caliber or gauge, and full particulars of the owner, with an accepted form of Identification ID to be presented and recorded. Gunsmiths are required to maintain these records in a permanent, non-alterable form.

The ATF inspects the premises of all licensed gunsmiths with unannounced visits at periodic intervals. The ATF is granted the power by the U.S. government to initiate the prosecution in U.S. federal court of gunsmiths that wilfully omit or violate these provisions. Punishment can range from losing their FFL (and therefore the privilege to engage in any firearms-related business), to fines and in severe cases, such as conspiring to supply the criminal element with black market weaponry, imprisonment in a federal prison.

Gunsmiths who lack sophisticated machine shop capabilities must understand the law. Enlisting an unlicensed machine shop (one without an FFL) to create gun receivers can be illegal. Other common parts such as grips, barrels, triggers, sights, magazines, recoil springs, and stocks can be manufactured freely, but all receiver development work does require licensing.

Generally, gunsmiths cannot undertake the repair of a firearm they believe is illegally held by a person not permitted to own a firearm (a convicted felon, for instance) or one that otherwise violates the laws where the owner resides. The ownership of firearms in the US is governed by local laws. These laws and regulations vary greatly from state to state, county to county, city to city, and potentially across all jurisdictional lines.

Additionally, modifications to firearms made by gunsmiths are restricted as well. The ATF specifies what modifications are permitted or not permitted and to which firearms that may or may not be applied.

These laws may also vary by:

- firearm type (Handgun, longarm, rifle, shotgun? Cartridge or cap-and-ball? Modern, or antique/antique replica?)
- firearm model (semi-automatic? full automatic? caliber?)
- intended modification (minimum barrel length? magazine size? fully automatic? conversion from cap-and-ball to cartridge?)
- customer or recipient (legal owner? felon? background check?)
- quantity of firearms (how many per week? per month?)

== Notable gunsmiths ==
- Honoré Blanc (1736-1801), French gunsmith who pioneered the use of interchangeable parts
- Hugo Borchardt (6 June, 1844 – 8 May, 1924), German firearms inventor and engineer, invented the Borchardt C-93 pistol and Sharps-Borchardt Model 1878 rifle.
- Nicolas-Noël Boutet (31 August, 1761 – 1833), French gunsmith, bladesmith, director of Versailles state arms factory
- Browning family
  - Jonathan Browning (October 22, 1805 – June 21, 1879), American pioneer and firearms inventor. Was a notable producer of harmonica guns, an early type of repeating rifle.
  - John M. Browning (January 23, 1855 – November 26, 1926), firearms inventor and designer. Created many notable firearms, including the Browning Auto-5, Winchester Model 12, the Browning Automatic Rifle, M1911 pistol, and the M1919 Browning and M2 Browning.
  - Val A. Browning (August 20, 1895 – May 16, 1994), weapons designer and engineer. Designed the Browning Double Automatic Shotgun.
- Henry Deringer (October 26, 1786 – February 28, 1868), inventor of the Derringer pistol.
- Ernest Dumoulin, Belgian gunsmith.
- Louis-Nicolas Flobert (1819 – 1894), French inventor of the first rimfire metallic cartridge in 1845.
- John Garand (January 1, 1888 – February 16, 1974), Canadian-American firearms designer, inventor of the M1 Garand.
- Richard Jordan Gatling (September 12, 1818 – February 26, 1903), inventor of the Gatling gun.
- Jacob and Samuel Hawken (1786 – 1849, 1792 – 1884), American gunsmiths, designed the Hawken rifle.
- Alexander Henry (1818-1894), Scottish gunsmith, designed the Henry rifling and barrel used in the Martini–Henry rifle.
- Benjamin Tyler Henry (March 22, 1821–December 29, 1898), American gunsmith, inventor of the Henry rifle.
- Kunitomo Ikkansai (November 21, 1778 – December 26, 1840), Japanese gun manufacturer.
- Erik Jørgensen (17 May 1848 – 1896), Norwegian gunsmith, noted for his part in developing the Krag–Jørgensen rifle.
- Mikhail Kalashnikov (10 November 1919 – 23 December 2013), Soviet firearms designer, inventor of the AK-47 and AK-74 line of assault rifles.
- Ole Herman Johannes Krag (7 April 1837 – 9 December 1916), Norwegian military officer and weapons designer, noted for his part in developing the Krag–Jørgensen rifle.
- Jean Alexandre LeMat (1824–1883), French gunsmith, inventor of the LeMat revolver.
- Georg Luger (6 March, 1849 – 22 December, 1923), Austrian weapons designer, inventor of the Luger pistol and the 9×19mm Parabellum cartridge.
- Nikolay Makarov, (22 May, 1914 – 13 May, 1988), Soviet weapons designer, inventor of the Makarov pistol.
- Mauser family
  - Paul Mauser (27 June, 1838 – 29 May, 1914), German weapons designer, manufacturer, and industrialist.
  - Wilhelm Mauser (2 May, 1834 – 13 January, 1882), German weapons designer, manufacturer, and industrialist.
- Hiram Maxim (February 5, 1840 – November 24, 1916), American-born inventor and later naturalized British subject, known as the inventor of the Maxim gun.
- Bob Munden (February 8, 1942 – December 10, 2012), gunsmith and exhibition shooter.
- Evelyn Owen (1915 – 1949), Australian gunsmith and inventor of the Owen submachine gun.
- William B. Ruger (June 21, 1916 – July 6, 2002), American gunsmith and co-founder of Sturm, Ruger & Company.
- Dieudonné Saive (1889–1973), Belgian small arms designer, inventor of the FN Model 1949 and the FN FAL.
- Giulio V. Savioli (June 12, 1933 – July 31, 2009), Italian-American firearms designer and gunsmith.
- Eugene Stoner (November 22, 1922 – April 24, 1997), American firearms designer, inventor of the ArmaLite AR-15, later adopted for military use as the M16 rifle.
- Patrick Sweeney, American gunsmith, author, and editor of Guns & Ammo magazine.
- John T. Thompson (December 31, 1860 – June 21, 1940), United States Army officer, inventor of the Thompson submachine gun.
- Fedor Tokarev (2 June 1871 – 6 March 1968), Russian weapons designer, designed the Tokarev pistols and rifles.
- Ernest Vervier, Belgian gunsmith, designed the FN MAG and FN Minimi.
- Carl Walther (22 November, 1858 – 9 July, 1915), German gunsmith, founder of the firm Carl Walther GmbH Sportwaffen.
- Gene Wayne Kelly (25 September 1957), American gunsmith, founder and current president of the American Gunsmithing Institute.

== See also ==
- Glossary of firearms terms
- List of established military terms
- Improvised firearm
