= Stevens Model 520/620 =

Model of American pump-action shotgun

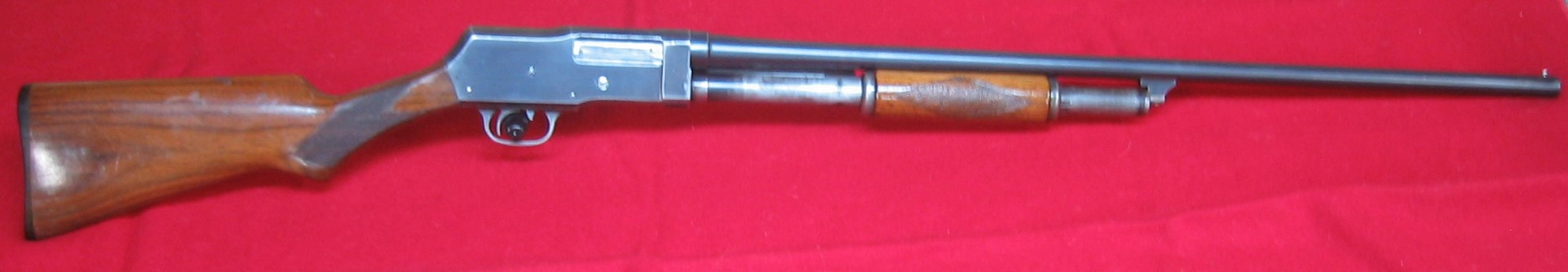
- Stevens Model 520
- Type: Shotgun
- Place of origin: United States

Service history
- In service: 1941 - 1975
- Used by: US Military (M520-30, M620)
- Wars: World War II, Korean War, Vietnam War

Production history
- Designer: John Browning
- Manufacturer: J. Stevens Arms & Tool Co (1909–1916), J. Stevens Arms Co/Savage Arms Co (1916–1955)
- Produced: Model 520 (1909–1939), Model 620 (1927–1939), Model 520A (1940–1947), Model 620A (1940–1955)
- No. built: 191,000+
- Variants: Models 522, 525, 530, 535, 621 Ranger 30, 31, 102.25 JC Higgins 102.25 Western Field 30, 35, 60

Specifications

The Stevens Model 520 was a pump-action shotgun developed by John Browning and originally manufactured by the J Stevens Arms & Tool Company between 1909 and 1916. Stevens was sold to New England Westinghouse on 28 May 1915 and production of civilian firearms was greatly reduced. The company was renamed the "J Stevens Arms Company" on 1 July 1916 and New England Westinghouse used their manufacturing facility in Chicopee Falls, MA to produce Mosin-Nagant rifles under contract for the Russian Czar during World War I. After the war, Stevens was sold to Savage Arms on 1 April 1920 and full production of civilian firearms resumed. Under Savage ownership, Model 520 production continued until 1939 when it was replaced by the Model 520A which ended production in 1948. Stevens also further modified the design when they introduced the streamlined Model 620 in 1927. The Model 620 was internally similar to the Model 520 and was produced until 1939 when it was replaced by the Model 620A which ended production in 1955. This shotgun is a hammerless, pump action, take-down design with a tubular magazine which holds 5 shells. All models can also be slam fired: the shotgun has no trigger disconnector and shells can be fired one after the other simply by working the slide if the trigger is held down.

== Background ==
John Browning filed a patent for a "hammerless" shotgun with a unique take-down barrel and locking breech block on 10 Jul 1903. It was approved on 7 Feb 1905, and along with a separate 27 Aug 1907 patent that applied to the connection between the slide arm and the fore-end, became the Stevens Model 520. Browning eventually sold this design to the J Stevens Arms & Tool Company in Chicopee Falls, MA.

Browning Patent: 7 Feb 1905 Take-Down Feature (M520-30)

== Model 520 ==
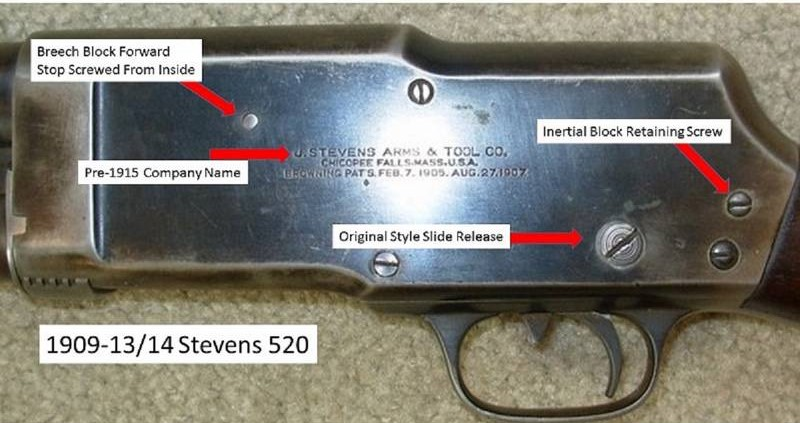
Stevens Model 520 (1909–1913)

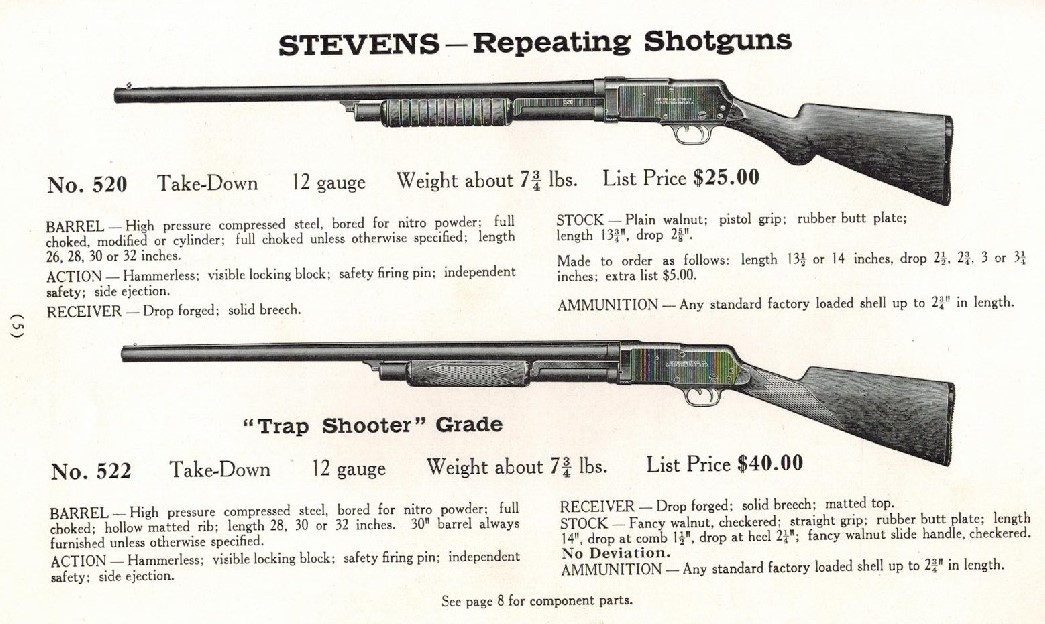
Stevens Catalog No. 53 (1911)

The first Stevens 520 appeared in Stevens' 1909 Catalog No. 52 and was also offered for sale in the fall 1909 Sears & Roebuck catalog. It is easily recognizable by its "humpback" double receiver. It has a round slide release knob on the left side of the receiver, a visible breach locking bolt on the top of the receiver, and base models have a rounded pistol grip on the buttstock. The foregrip is ringed and uniform in size. The trigger housing is retained with three screws and the safety is a lever located inside the trigger guard in front of the trigger. The cartridge stop is a rocker design with a set screw on the front right side of the receiver. There were other models including a Model 522 trap gun and the 525, 530, and 535 with increasing levels of engraving and stock quality (some straight grip) and foregrips. Internally there is an inertial slide release block that is affixed to the inside of the receiver. This inertial release uses the recoil of a discharged round to unlock the breech. The action was designed to only unlock after firing or with the use of the slide release and not by dry firing like many modern shotguns. All model 520s were only offered in 12 gauge until 1928.

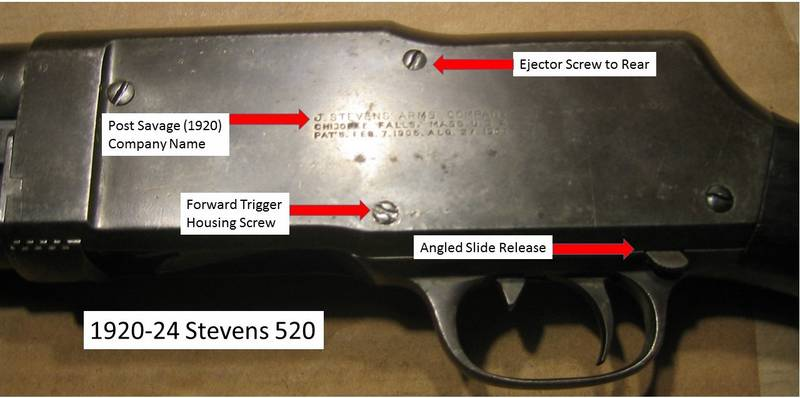
Stevens Model 520 (1920-1924)

Around 1918, Stevens provided a 520 trench gun prototype to the US military for service in World War I. Supposedly, several examples were made but only one sample survives. It was sold at the Rock Island auction on 19 December 2019 for $10,000. It has a unique two piece heat shield-bayonet lug.

When Savage Arms purchased Stevens in 1920, the Model 520 was updated, incorporating several design changes that were emerging prior to 1916. These include a relocated slide release button, moved from the left side of the receiver to the left side of the trigger plate, and a redesigned inertial slide release, incorporated into the design of the trigger plate.

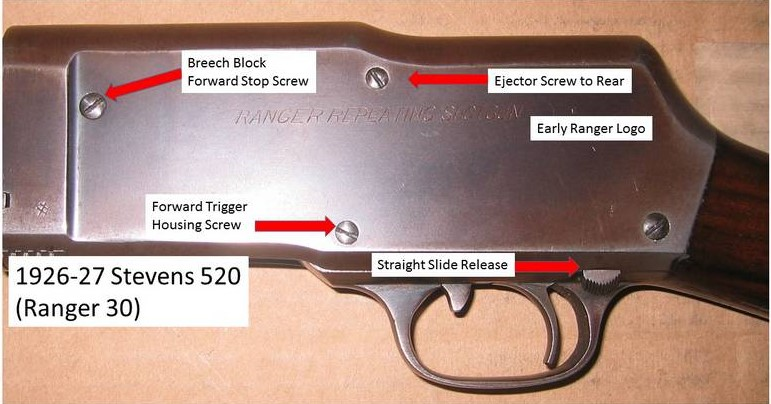
Stevens Model 520 (1926-1927)

In 1925, the Model 520 first appeared as a store-branded gun when it is sold as the Ranger Repeater Model 30 by Sears and the Western Field Model 30 by Montgomery Wards. Around this time the inertial slide release blocks were removed and replaced with a spring that provided forward pressure on the slide release. Guns made after this time can be unlocked after a dry fire with forwarding pressure on the slide.

In 1928, the first sub-gauge Model 520 was introduced when a 16 gauge option was offered. It was followed in 1930 by a 20 gauge Model 520.

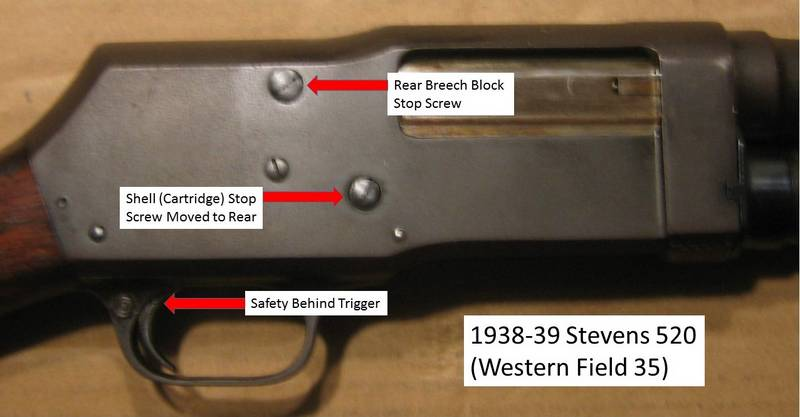
Stevens Model 520 (1938-1939)

The Model 520 last appeared in a Stevens sales publication in 1928 and 1929 (Catalog #57) but remained in full production until 1939. During this time it was sold as a store branded gun and under Stevens' budget line Riverside Arms. The shotgun went through several design changes during this period. Most notably was a redesign of the cartridge stop in 1933 and the relocation of the safety, from inside the trigger guard to behind the trigger in 1937.

Model 520 production ended in 1939 and it was replaced by the improved Model 520A in 1940.

== Model 520A ==
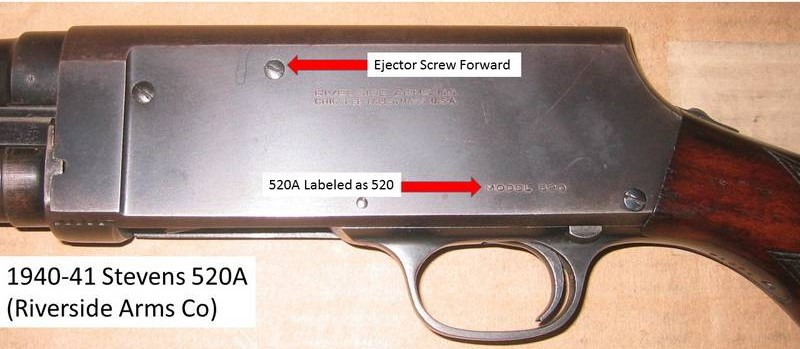
Stevens Model 520A (1940-1941)

The redesigned Model 520A was closely related to the Model 520, utilizing the same takedown action and locking breech block. The receiver lost the distinctive double hump and had a flat top and squared-off back end. The safety was moved to the receiver tang and the trigger housing was redesigned to use a coil mainspring instead of a flat bar mainspring. The 520A continued to be sold as a store-branded gun and under Stevens' budget line Riverside Arms (stamped Model 520). The 520A was never shown in a Stevens sales publication, it only appeared in Sears & Roebuck and Montgomery Wards catalogs and in Stevens component parts catalogs (the only source where it was identified as a 520A).

Stevens halted civilian production in 1942 to make weapons for use by the US military during World War II (see Model 520-30 below). Civilian Model 520A production resumed after World War II, again as store-branded guns, and continued until 1948.

== Model 620 ==
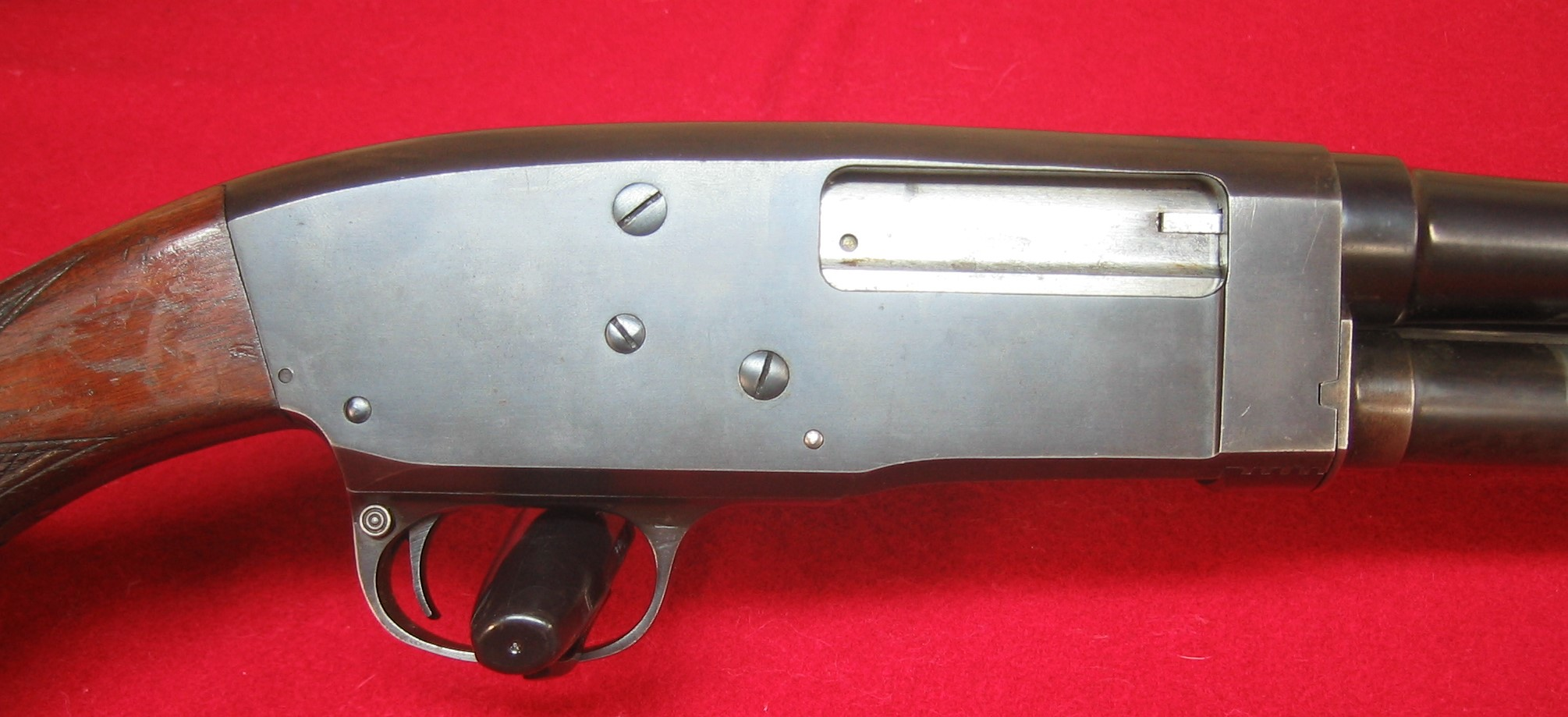
Stevens Model 620 (1938-39) 20Ga

The Model 620 was introduced in 1927 and is a streamlined version of the original 520. The safety was initially located inside the trigger housing just like the Model 520 but by 1929 it had been changed to a cross-bolt located behind the trigger. The stock was attached by a bolt connecting the receiver and trigger tangs through the grip of the stock. Initially, the 620 was only offered in 12 gauge but a 16 gauge followed in 1928 and a 20 gauge was introduced in 1930.

== Model 620A ==
The Model 620A began production in 1940. The main difference between the 620 and the 620A was how the stock attaches. The 620A used a long draw bolt through the end of the stock and did away with the receiver and trigger plate tangs used on the 620. Without the trigger tang, a flat mainspring had no place to attach and the 620A had a shortened trigger housing using a coil mainspring. Civilian production of the Model 620A halted during World War II but continued afterward until 1955.

== Model 520-30 and 620A (US military) ==
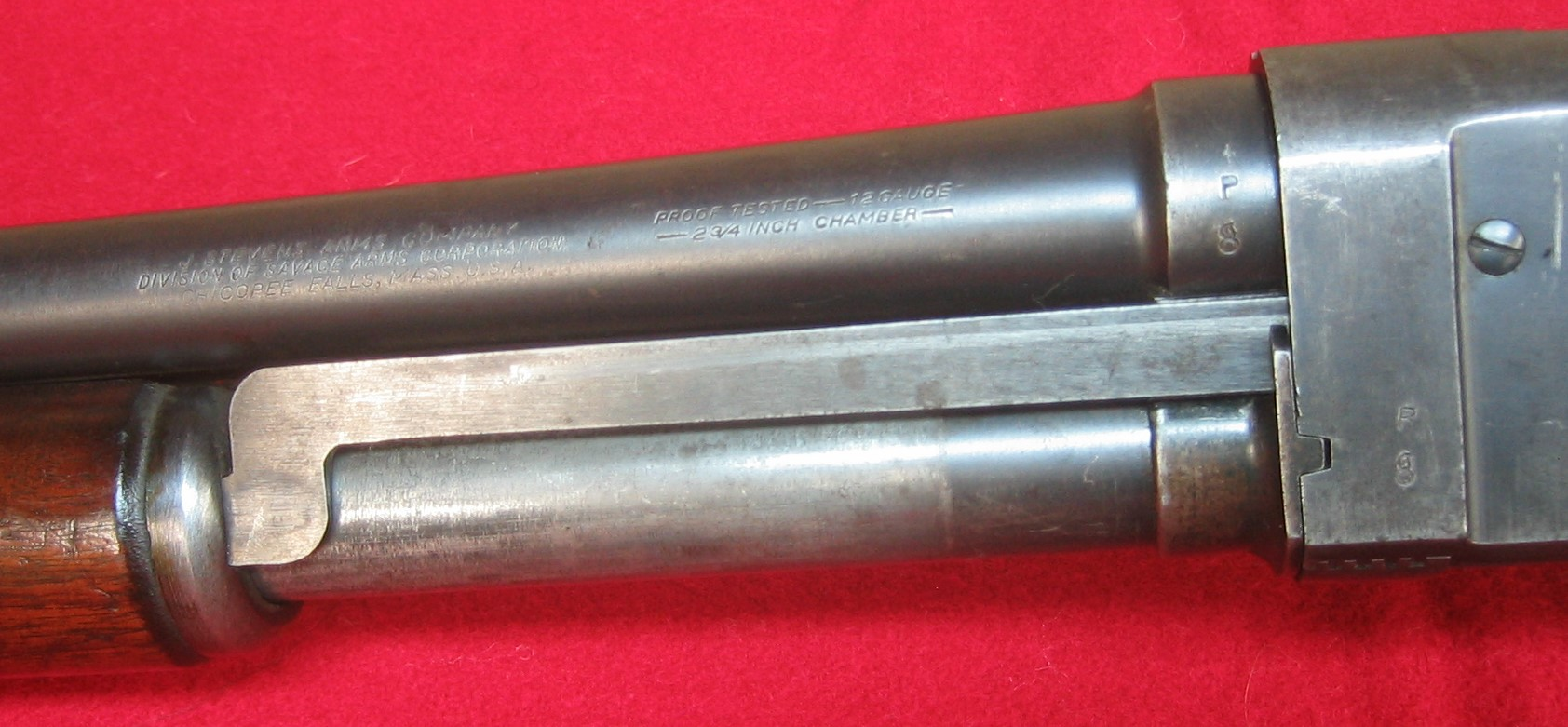
Stevens World War II riot gun markings (M620A)

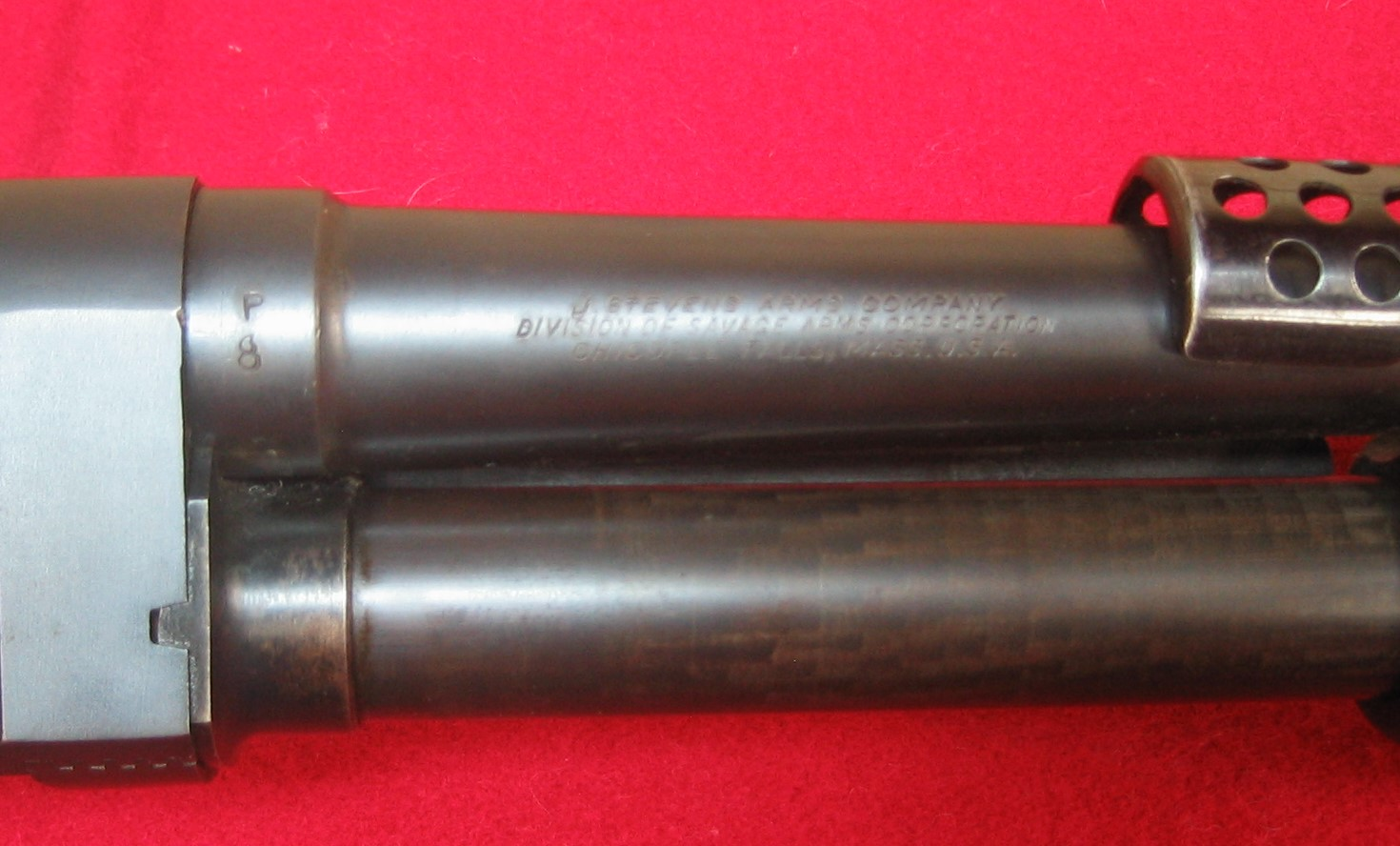
Stevens World War II trench gun markings (M520-30)

During World War II, Stevens began producing both the Model 520A (renamed the Model 520–30) and the Model 620A (labeled as the Model 620) as trench guns, riot guns, and long-barreled training guns for the US military. Trench guns were produced with 20-inch barrels (cylinder bore) and had heat shields with unique pinkish anodized bayonet lugs attached to the front (late war examples had a small "S" stamped on the left side).

The receivers of both models were stamped on the left side (from front to back) with a small "P" and ordnance bomb, "Model 520-30" or "Model 620", and a small "U.S." over the trigger. Model 520-30 trench gun barrels are marked "Proof Tested--12 Gauge --2 3/4 Inch Chamber--" on the left side and have another small "P" and ordnance bomb and the "J Stevens Arms Company" address on the right side of the barrel. This was done so that all the markings could be read with the heat shield installed. Some Model 620 trench gun barrels were marked in the same manner as the Model 520-30 trench guns and some had all the barrel markings on the left side. Trench guns were also fitted with a sling swivel in the stock. Riot guns also had 20-inch barrels (cylinder bore) and had all the same martial markings, except that all the barrel markings were on the left side. The long-barreled training guns were marked in the same manner as riot guns and were mainly used for aerial gunnery training. Total wartime production of all Model 520-30 shotguns was 33,306 and all Model 620 shotguns were 12,174.

After the war, the US military standardized both the Model 520-30 and the Model 620 and kept them in the inventory. They were used in the Korean War and as late as the Vietnam War.

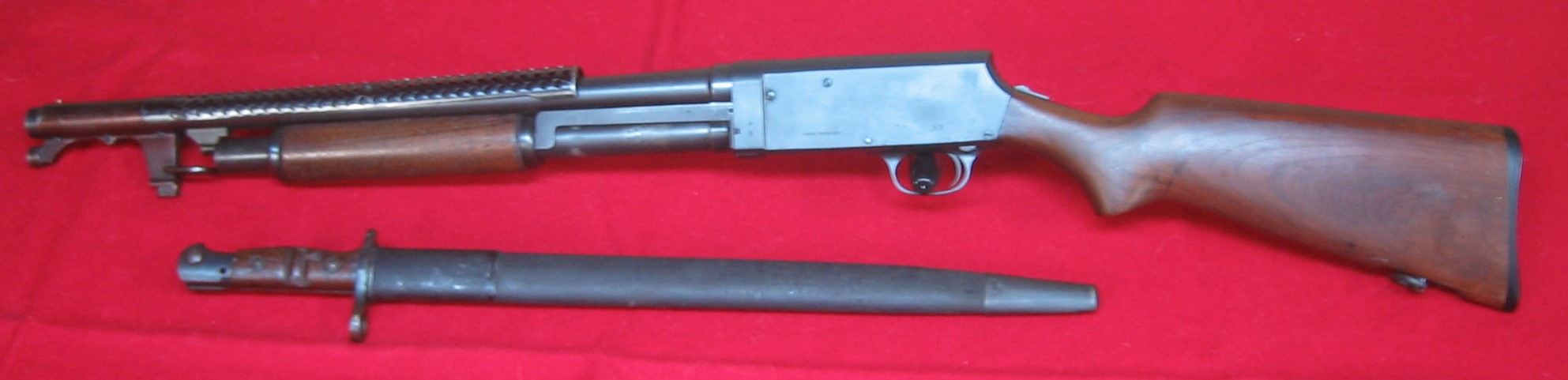
Stevens World War II M520-30 trench gun with M1917 bayonet
