= Browning Superposed =

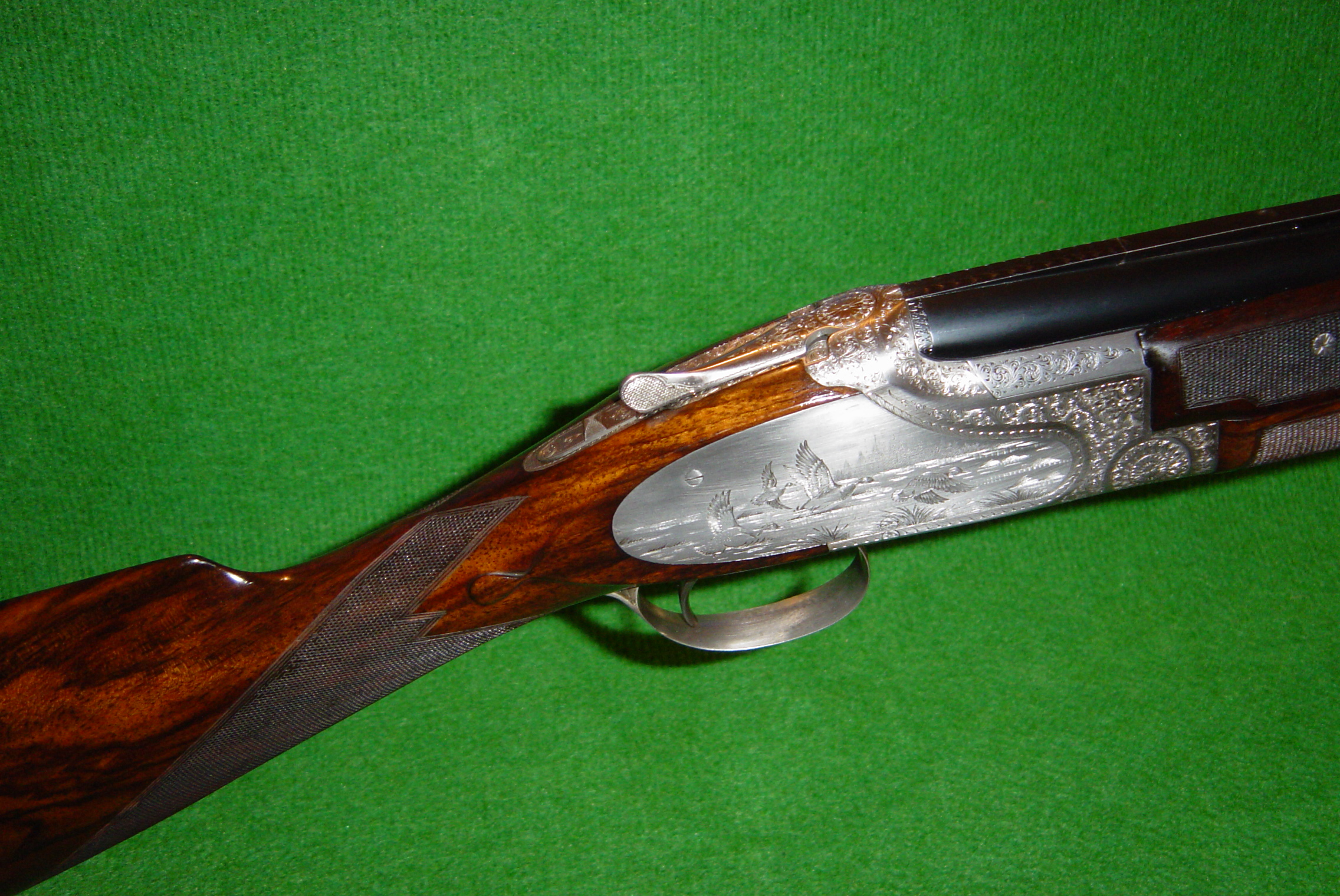
- Browning Superposed B25
- Type: Shotgun
- Place of origin: United States; Belgium

Production history
- Designer: John Browning; Val A. Browning
- Designed: 1922–1931
- Manufacturer: Browning Arms Co. Fabrique Nationale
- Produced: 1931–1940; 1948–1960

Specifications
- Barrel length: 20 in (510 mm), 26 in (660 mm), 28 in (710 mm), 30 in (760 mm)
- Caliber: 12 gauge, 16 gauge, 20 gauge, 28 gauge, and .410 bore
- Action: Boxlock

The Browning Superposed was a Belgian-produced over-and-under shotgun introduced to the United States two years after the start of the Great Depression, in 1931. Despite its original high cost, it was regarded as a fine and valuable weapon by both shooting competitors and hunters.

The Superposed introduced a wide variety of innovations including the single select trigger and over-under design. This design was considered revolutionary in the 1930s, but Browning had patents on the design long before that, as far back as 1923.

== History ==
It was the last firearm to be designed by John Browning. After Browning's death, the design work was completed by his son Val A. Browning. Original production dates were 1931–1940. Original production grades were Grade I (Lightning/Standard), Pigeon, Diana and Midas.

Post World War II production began in 1948 and lasted until 1960 when the model underwent major changes.
