= Jonathan Browning (inventor) =

American gunmaker

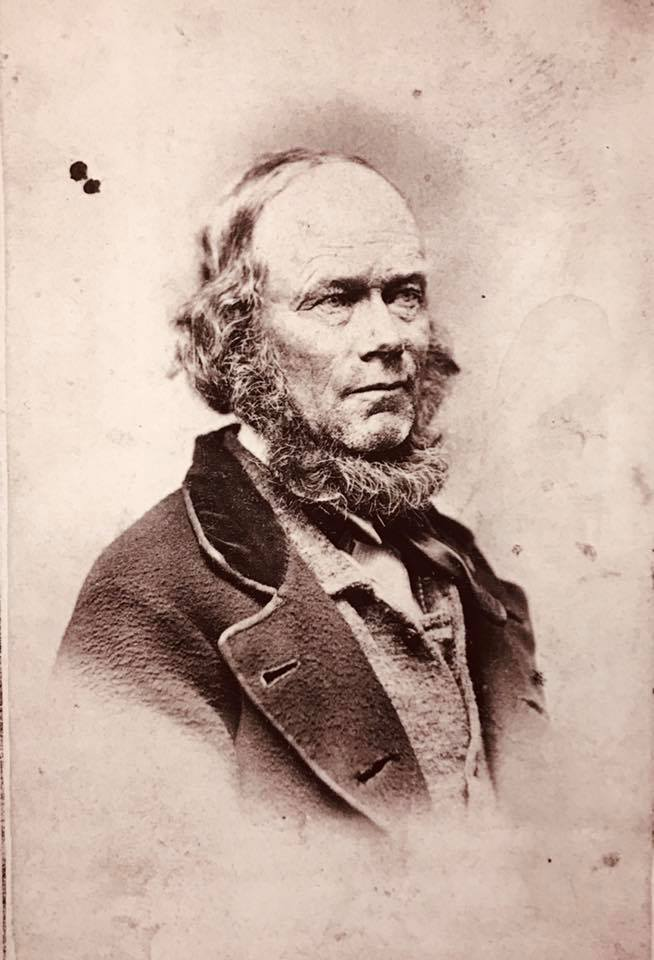

Personal details
- Born: October 22, 1805; Bethpage, Tennessee, U.S.
- Died: June 21, 1879 (aged 73) Ogden, Utah Territory, U.S. (Present-day, Ogden, Utah, U.S.)
- Resting place: Ogden City Cemetery; 41.233°N 111.962°W
- Home town: Ogden, Utah Territory, U.S. (Present-day, Ogden, Utah, U.S.)
- Known For: Harmonica gun
- Occupation: Blacksmith and Gunsmith
- Spouse(s): Elizabeth Stalcup m. 1826, Elizabeth C. Clark m. 1854, Ann Emmett m. 1858
- Children: 22, including: John M Browning; Matthew S. Browning
- Parents: Edmund Browning; Sarah B. Allen
- Relatives: Including: Val A. Browning (grandson)

Jonathan Browning (October 22, 1805 – June 21, 1879) was an American inventor and gunsmith.

== Early life ==
Jonathan Browning was born October 22, 1805, in Sumner County, Tennessee. He began his career as a blacksmith, but by 1824 switched to become a gunsmith after an apprenticeship with Samuel Porter in Nashville. He began producing firearms independently by 1831 and shortly thereafter invented a "sliding breech" repeating rifle, also called a Harmonica gun, between 1834 and 1842 while living in Quincy, Illinois. Each Harmonica gun took two weeks to manufacture by hand and was available to purchase for $24.00.

Browning moved his family to White's Creek, near Nashville, in 1827 and resided there until the spring of 1833. Jonathan moved with his extended family and spent a season in Fairfield, Illinois, visiting with his sister Clarissa Neel.

In 1834, Jonathan and his brother James Green Browning bought farms thirty miles northeast of Quincy in La Prairie, Illinois. A family story has been passed down that he came to know a young lawyer by the name of Abraham Lincoln, who was an overnight guest in his home on at least two occasions.

== Missouri period ==
In October 1838, Governor Lilburn Boggs issued the Extermination Order that caused the followers of Joseph Smith to flee Missouri. Browning came into contact with many of the Latter-day Saint exiles. Curious about the new settlement in the swampy lands of Nauvoo, Illinois, Browning paid a visit, meeting with the Latter Day Saints president Joseph Smith, which influenced Browning to convert to the Church of Jesus Christ of Latter Day Saints.

== Nauvoo period ==
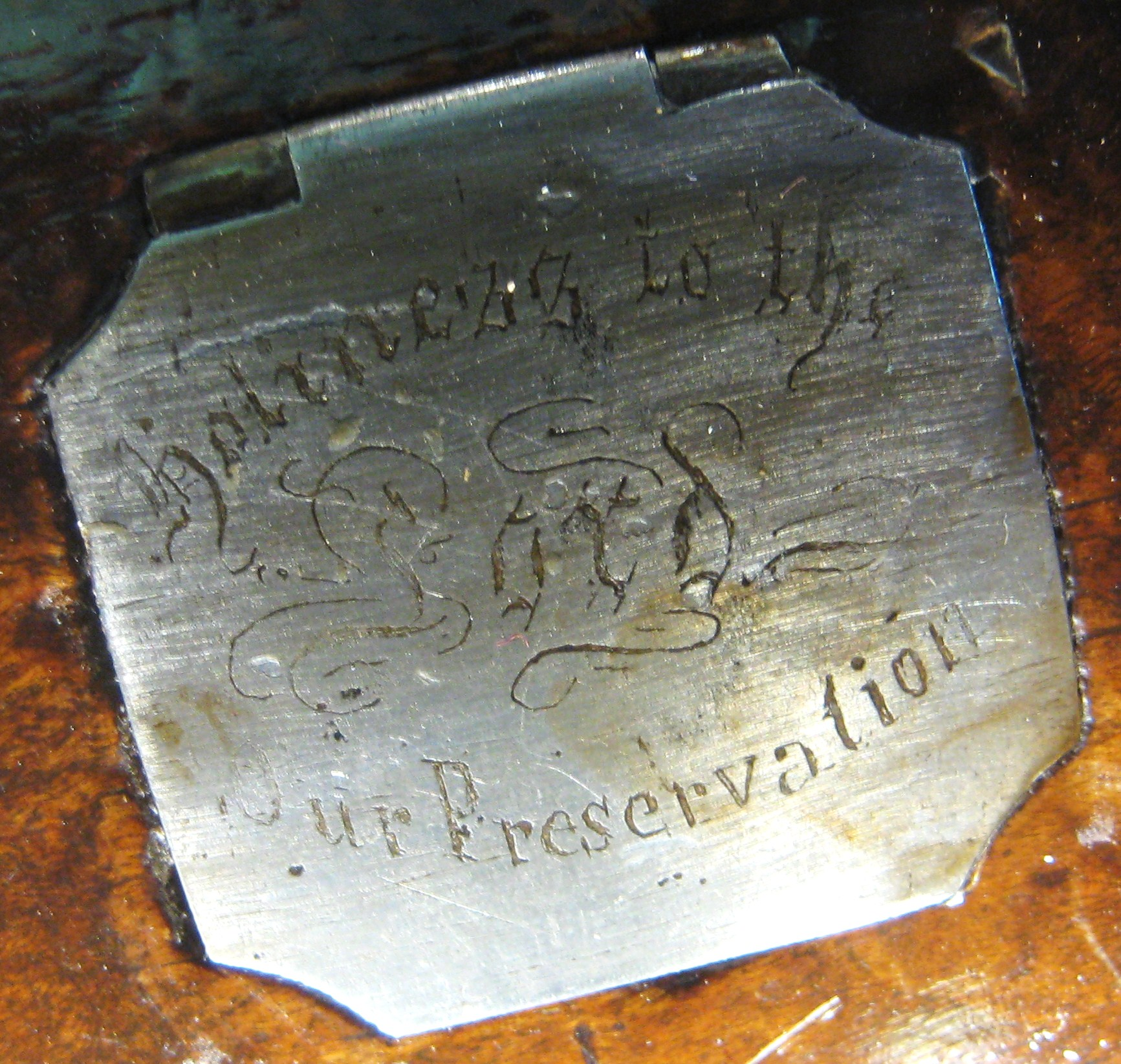
The label on a Browning gun from the Nauvoo period, stating: "Holiness to the Lord - Our Preservation."

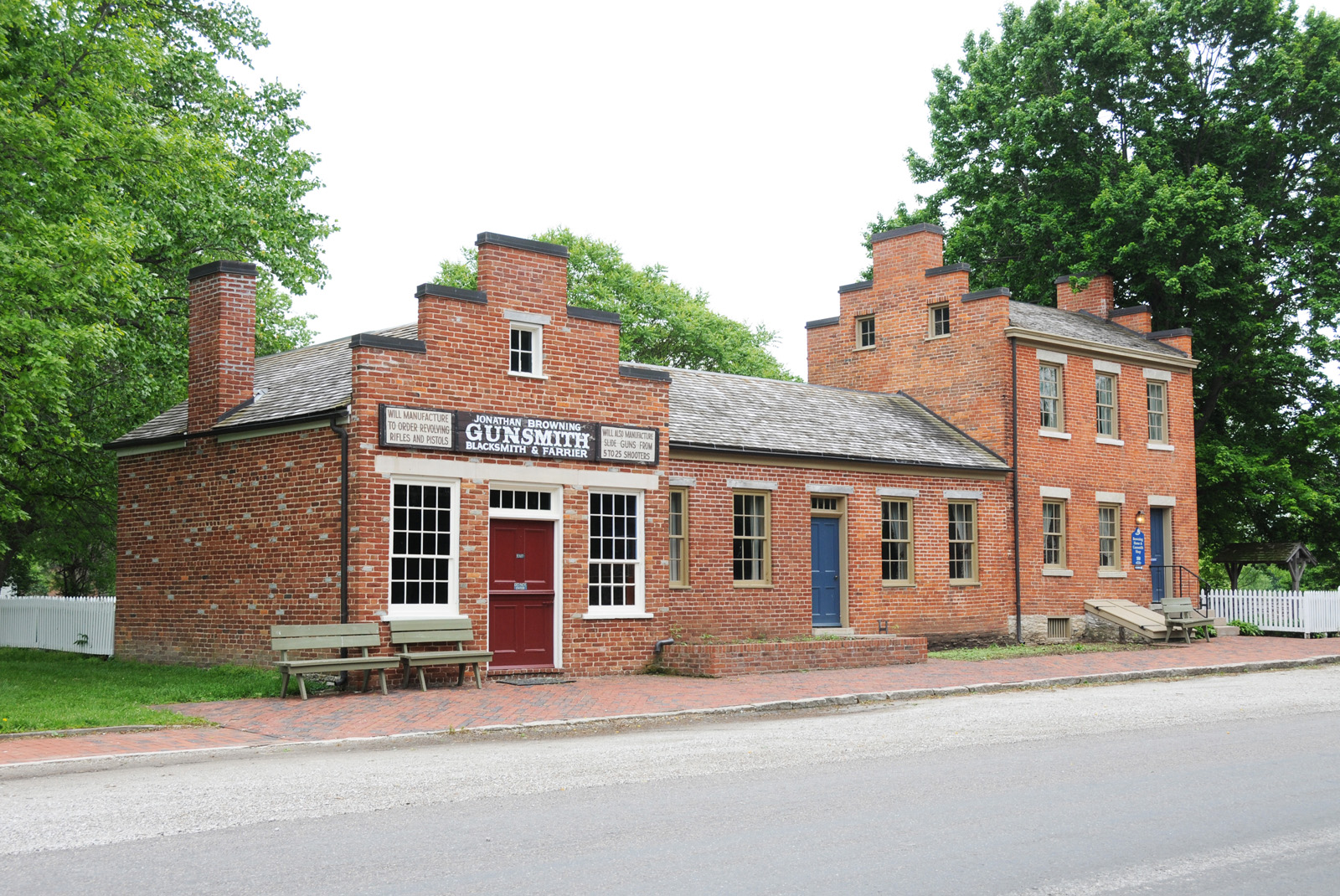
Jonathan Browning Home and Gunsmith Shop, Nauvoo, Illinois. Browning lived and worked in these buildings from 1842-1846.

Browning moved to Nauvoo and joined the community in 1842, buying the Bird home and adding a connecting gunshop. In 1844, the Mormons’ leader, Joseph Smith, was assassinated, and Browning was among the group which later fled Nauvoo in 1846.

Guns that Browning produced were labeled "Holiness to the Lord - Our Preservation". The Jonathan Browning Home and Gunshop built in 1842 was restored during the 1960s. Registered with the Ensign Peak Foundation -- formerly The Mormon Historic Sites Foundation -- the museum is open to the public at no charge.

== Utah period ==
Browning fled Illinois with Brigham Young in late 1846 to escape religious persecution. He settled in the community of Mosquito Creek near Council Bluffs, Iowa, and repaired guns for the local settlers who were migrating to Utah, while awaiting Brigham Young to invite him to join the main body of settlers in Utah. When the Mormon Battalion was formed during the War with Mexico, Browning wanted to join them, but was told by Young that his skills would not be needed by the soldiers as much as by the main body of pioneers in Kanesville.

Browning received word from Brigham Young to join the main party of settlers in 1852. He left Mosquito Creek, Iowa, July 8, 1852, and migrated across the Rocky Mountains as the captain of ten wagons in the Henry W. Miller Company. He arrived October 2, 1852, with six wagons and $600 to the Salt Lake Valley. Browning moved to Ogden, Utah, where he established a gun shop. As was common in the community at that time, Jonathan Browning was a polygamist, having taken three wives. He fathered 22 children and had two stepdaughters; prominent among them was the gun designer John Moses Browning, who became one of the most important figures in the development of modern automatic and semi-automatic firearms; and Matthew Sandefur Browning (1859 – 1923), co-founder of Browning Brothers. Jonathan ran his gun shop and invested in real estate in Ogden. He was a member of the Utah Territorial Assembly (1853-1854), and also served as Justice of the Peace and Probate Judge for Weber County, Utah Territory. His primary focus though, was on his gun shop located along present-day Washington Avenue in Ogden. His son John Moses Browning later recalled, "We ridiculed some of the guns we fixed, and I damned some of them when Pappy wasn't near, but it never occurred to us to make better ones. He was too old, and I was too young." Jonathan died June 21, 1879, in Ogden.
