= John Browning =

American firearms designer (1855–1926)

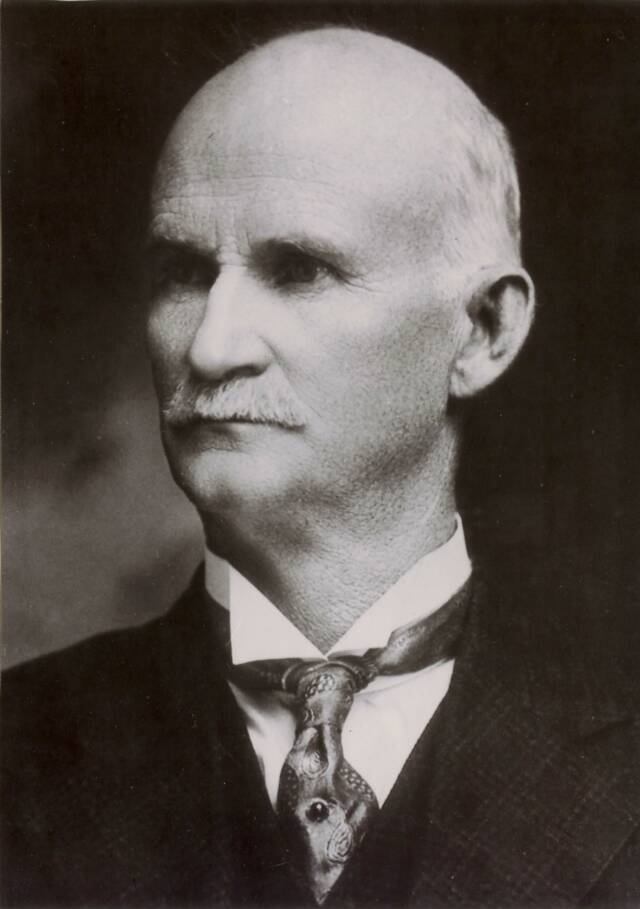
- Browning, c. 1915
- Born: John Moses Browning; January 23, 1855; Ogden, Utah Territory, US
- Died: November 26, 1926 (aged 71); Liège, Belgium
- Occupation: Gunsmith
- Spouse: Rachel Theresa Child (m. 1879)
- Children: 10, including Val
- Father: Jonathan Browning
- Awards: John Scott Medal (1905); Order of Léopold (1914)

John Moses Browning (January 23, 1855 – November 26, 1926) was an American firearm designer who developed many varieties of military and civilian firearms, cartridges, and gun mechanisms, many of which are still in use around the world. He made his first firearm at age 13 in his father's gun shop and was awarded the first of his 128 firearm patents on October 7, 1879, at the age of 24. He is regarded as one of the most successful firearms designers of the 19th and 20th centuries and a pioneer of modern repeating, semi-automatic, and automatic firearms.

Browning influenced nearly all categories of firearms design, especially the autoloading of ammunition. He invented, or made significant improvements to, single-shot, lever-action, and pump-action rifles and shotguns. He developed the first reliable and compact autoloading pistols by inventing the telescoping bolt, then integrating the bolt and barrel shroud into what is known as the pistol slide. Browning's telescoping bolt design is found on nearly every modern semi-automatic pistol, as well as several modern fully automatic weapons. He also developed the first gas-operated firearm, the Colt–Browning Model 1895 machine gun – a system that surpassed mechanical recoil operation to become the standard for most high-power self-loading firearm designs worldwide. He also made significant contributions to automatic cannon development.

Browning's most successful designs include the M1911 pistol, the water-cooled M1917, the air-cooled M1919, and heavy M2 machine guns, the M1918 Browning Automatic Rifle, and the Browning Auto-5 – the first semi-automatic shotgun. Some of these arms are still manufactured, often with only minor changes in detail and cosmetics to those assembled by Browning or his licensees. The Browning-designed M1911 and Hi-Power are some of the most copied firearms in the world.

== Early life and craftsmanship ==
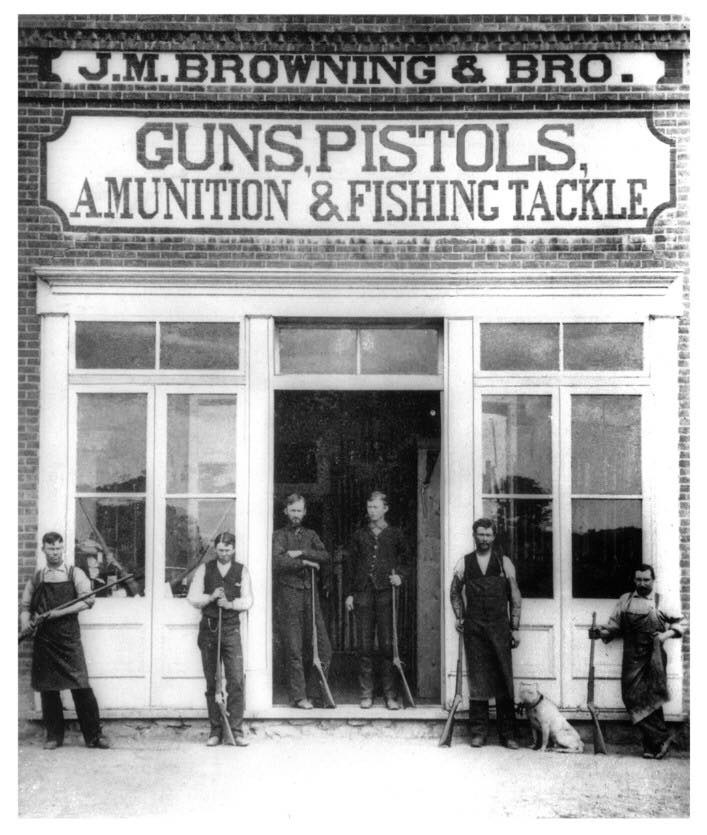
Browning Brothers gun shop, Ogden, Utah Territory, 1882. From left to right: Thomas Samuel Browning, George Emmett Browning, John Moses Browning, Matthew Sandefur Browning, Jonathan Edmund Browning, and Frank Rushton

Browning's father Jonathan—who was among the thousands of pioneers of the Church of Jesus Christ of Latter-day Saints who made an exodus from Nauvoo, Illinois, to Utah—established a gunsmith shop in Ogden in 1852. As was common in the Latter-day Saint community at the time, Jonathan Browning was a polygamist, having taken three wives. He fathered 22 children, including John Moses, and raised two stepdaughters with his wife Elizabeth Caroline Clark.

Browning worked in his father's Ogden shop from the age of seven, where he was taught basic engineering and manufacturing principles, and encouraged to experiment with new concepts. He developed his first rifle, a single-shot falling block action design while he was still his father's apprentice, then, in 1878, in partnership with his younger brother, co-founded John Moses and Matthew Sandefur Browning Company, later renamed Browning Arms Company. The company began producing the brothers' designs and other non-military firearms. By 1882, the company employed John and Matthew's half-brothers Jonathan (1859–1939), Thomas (1860–1943), William (1862–1919), and George (1866–1948).

Like his father, Browning was a member of The Church of Jesus Christ of Latter-day Saints, and served a two-year mission in Georgia beginning on March 28, 1887.

He married Rachel Theresa Child (September 14, 1860 – September 30, 1934) on April 10, 1879, in Ogden, Weber County, Utah Territory, and the couple had 10 children, two of whom died in infancy.

== Firearm designs ==
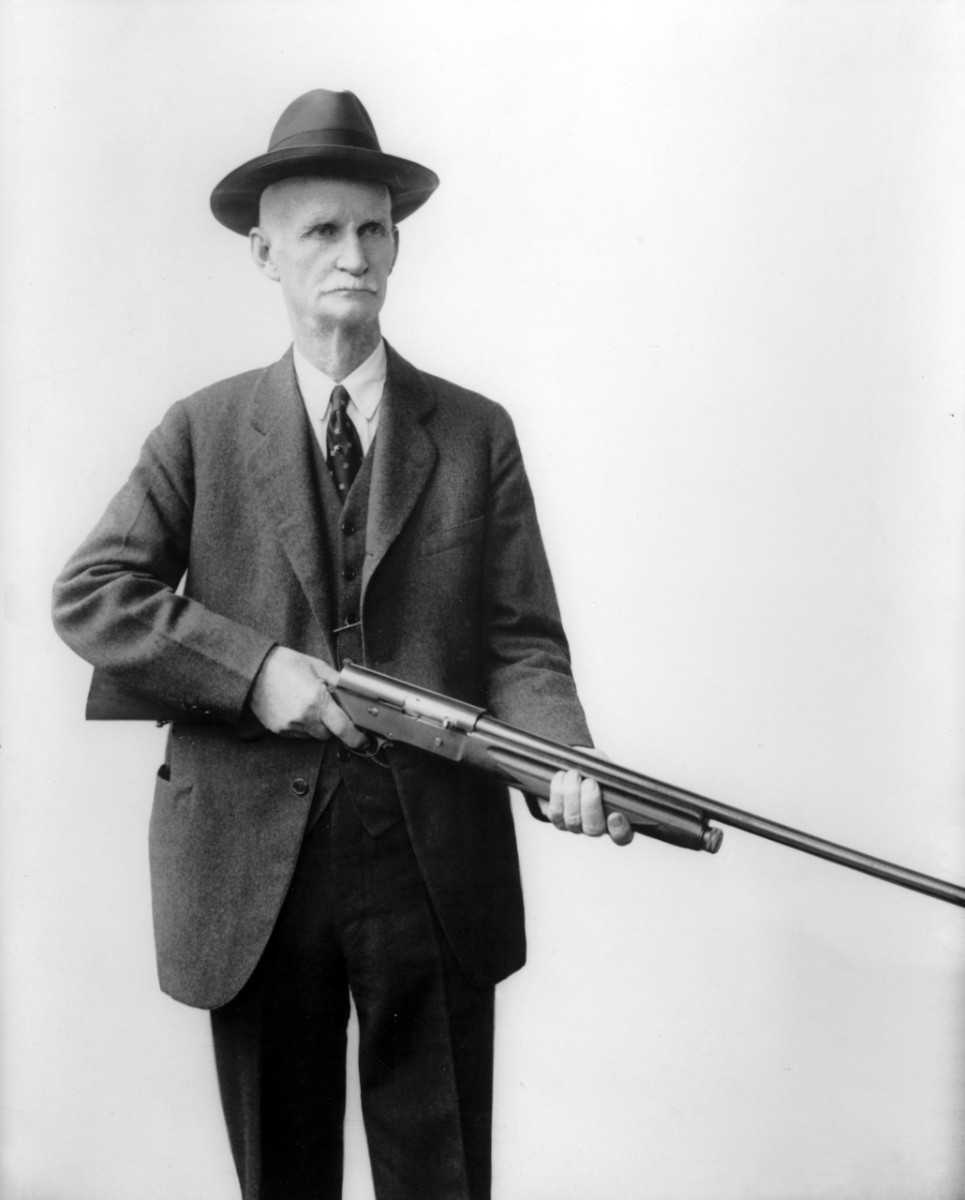
Browning with an Auto-5

Production examples of the Browning Model 1878 Single Shot Rifle caught the attention of the Winchester Repeating Arms Company, who dispatched a representative to evaluate the competition. Winchester bought the design for $8,000 and moved production to their Connecticut factory. From 1883, Browning worked in partnership with Winchester and designed a series of rifles and shotguns, most notably the lever action Winchester Model 1887 and the Model 1897 pump shotgun, the falling-block single-shot Model 1885, and the lever-action Model 1886, Model 1892, Model 1894, and Model 1895 rifles. After falling out with Winchester, Browning designed the long recoil operated semi-automatic Remington Model 8 rifle. Many of the models are still in production today in some form; over six million Model 1894s had been produced as of 1983, more than any other sporting rifle in history.

Winchester manufactured several popular small arms designed by John M. Browning. For decades in the late 19th century-early 20th century, Browning designs and Winchester firearms were synonymous and the collaboration was highly successful. This came to an end when Browning proposed a new long recoil operated semi-automatic shotgun design, a prototype finished in 1898, to Winchester management, which ultimately became the Browning Auto-5 shotgun. As was the custom of the time, Browning's earlier designs had been sold exclusively to Winchester for a single fee payment. With this new product, Browning and his brother Matthew sought royalties based upon unit sales, rather than a single front-end fee payment. If the new shotgun became highly successful, the Browning company stood to make substantially more income. Winchester management, which had agreed to royalties for an earlier Browning shotgun design that was never manufactured, now refused to accede to the Brownings' terms. Remington Arms also was approached but the president of the company died of a heart attack while the Brownings were waiting to offer him the gun. Remington would later produce a copy of the Auto-5 as the Model 11 which was used by the U.S. Military and was also sold to the civilian market.

Having recently successfully negotiated firearm licenses with Fabrique Nationale de Herstal of Belgium (FN), Browning took the new shotgun design to FN; the offer was accepted and FN manufactured the new shotgun, honoring its inventor, as the Browning Auto-5. The Browning Auto-5 was continuously manufactured as a highly popular shotgun throughout the 20th century. In response, Winchester shifted reliance away from John Browning designs when it adopted a shotgun design of Thomas Crossley Johnson for the new Winchester Model 1911 SL, (Johnson had to work around Browning's patents of what became the Auto-5) and the new Model 1912 pump shotgun, which was based in small part upon design features of the earlier Browning-designed Winchester Model 1897 shotgun. This shift marked the end of an era of Winchester-Browning collaboration.

== Small arms designs ==
In addition to designing rifles and shotguns, Browning was a small arms designer. During the first decade of semi-automatic handgun design, Brownings's early patents results in several notable creations.

In 1899 Fabrique Nationale in Belgium introduces the FN 1899, a Browning-designed self-loader with a reciprocating slide, an unlocked breach, and detachable magazine in the grip. It is upgraded in to the FN 1900 the following year with minor variations and upgraded again in 1902, and will sell over half a million units before 1910 and 750,000 units overall.

This pocket pistol used a then newly-designed .32 ACP (7.65mm Browning) semi-rimmed, straight-sided, centerfire smokeless powder cartridge, developed by both the Belgium’s and by Union Metallic Cartridge Company in Connecticut. It was a popular pocket pistol, and also quickly became preferred by many police and officers; because the .32 ACP cartridge does not require a locked breach. It also is not a proprietary cartridge; armories already equipped to manufacture firearms can manufacture .32’s as well. The FN 1900 was also preferred over the Bergman Simplex because of its form-factor and what today is called concealability. The .32 ACP is competitive with the Bergman 8mm’s, as well as .32 revolver cartridges marketed by S&W and Colt.

In 1900 Colt releases its first semi-automatic handgun, a Browning-designed self-loader, the Colt 1900, with a detachable magazine in the grip, a locked breach using a swinging link, and a reciprocating slide; it shoots a powerful new .38 ACP rimless, straight-sided, centerfire, smokeless powder cartridge (not to be confused with the later-developed .380 ACP), and is conceived as a military sidearm. This pattern will evolve to become the famous Colt 1911 in .45 ACP.

In 1903 Colt introduces the Browning-designed Model M, a .32 ACP pocket semi-automatic with an internal hammer, unlocked breach, and reciprocating slide. It will commence manufacture of this arm in caliber .380 in 1908. Like the Colt 1900, this form factor will exert dominance.

In 1903 Fabrique National (FN) introduces the Model 1903 (M1903), a Browning designed semi-automatic pistol designed to fire a new 9mm Browning Long cartridge. The cartridge will only be used in Europe, and will be adopted to some French handguns.

In 1905 Colt introduces the .45 ACP, a straight-sided, rimmed, centerfire, smokeless powder cartridge and a handgun to shoot it, with a locked breach, reciprocating slide, magazine in grip. This is midpoint between the Colt M1900 in .38 ACP, and the famous 1911.

In 1908 Browning designed pistols incorporate a new .25 ACP cartridge, a low-power straight-sided, centerfire rimless, smokeless powder cartridge, These pistols incorporate a reciprocating slide, unlocked breach, and a detachable magazine in the grip. The pattern is manufactured by both FN in Belgium (FN Model 1906) and by Colt in America (Model N), where it is called the Vest Pocket.

In 1908 Colt commences manufacture of the Browning-designed Model M in a new .380 ACP caliber, a shortened 9mm cartridge that is a rimless, straight-sided, centerfire, and uses smokeless powder. The .380 firearm is identical to the 1903 Model M in .32 ACP except for changes in the barrel. The .380 ACP caliber is considered the borderline for an unlocked breach weapon, and the limit of constructing an unlocked firearm.

In 1910 FN in Belgium introduces a Browning-designed self-loader with detachable magazine, grip safety, magazine disconnect, slide safety, and the recoil spring around the barrel, initially .32 ACP and later also in .380 ACP. The FN1910 is a market update to replace the popular FN1900.

In 1911 the Colt Model 1911 self-loader was introduced. It was chambered in .45 ACP, with a locked breach, reciprocating slide, and a magazine in grip. This is adopted by United States as its service sidearm and will remain so for decades.

In 1935 FN in Belgium introduces the Browning Hi Power, in 9mm Parabellum caliber. It is the last firearm to which John Browning contributed to the design; it was started by Browning but completed by Dieudonné Saive at FN Herstal. The Hi Power is adopted by several military organizations.

== Later work and life ==
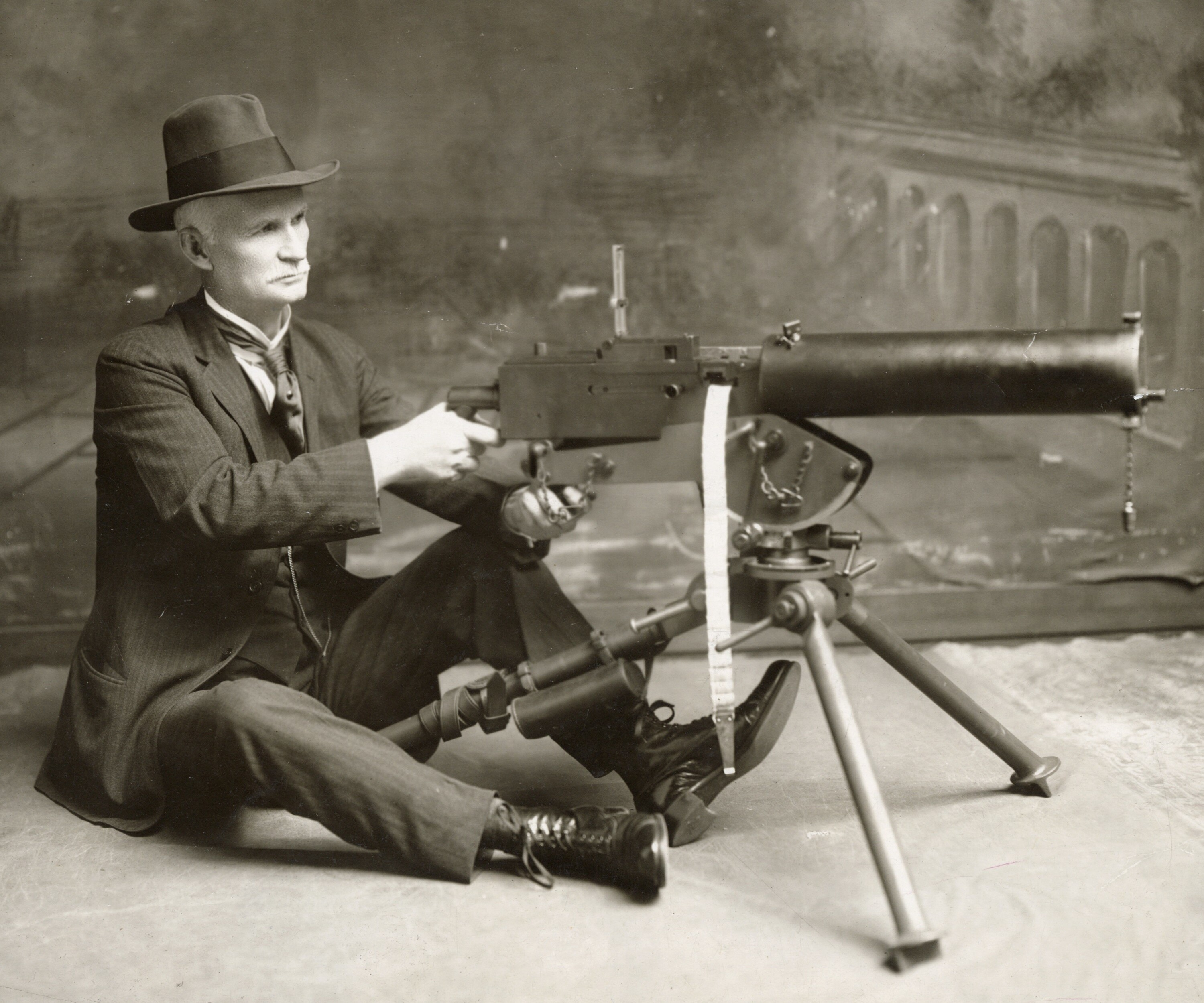
Browning seated with a M1907 machine gun

The premium-priced Browning Superposed shotgun, an over-under shotgun design, was his last completed firearm design. It was marketed originally with twin triggers; a single trigger modification was later completed by his son, Val Browning. Commercially introduced in 1931 by FN, Browning Superposed shotguns, and their more affordable cousins, the Browning Citori made in Asia, continue to be manufactured into the 21st century and come with varying grades of fine hand engraving and premium quality wood.

Throughout his life, Browning designed a vast array of military and civilian small arms for his own company, as well as for Winchester, Colt, Remington, Savage, Stevens, and Fabrique Nationale de Herstal of Belgium. Browning firearms have been made, both licensed and unlicensed, by hundreds of factories around the world. Browning Arms Company was established in 1927, the year after Browning's death on November 26, 1926, in Liège, Belgium. In 1977, FN Herstal acquired the company.

== Legacy ==
The M1895 Machine Gun saw action in the Spanish–American War with the United States Marine Corps. The Colt M1911, Browning 1917/19, and the BAR saw action with U.S. forces in World War I, World War II, and the Korean War. The M1911 went on to serve as the U.S.'s standard military side arm until 1986; a variant is still used by special operations units of the United States Marine Corps and the design remains very popular among civilian shooters and some police departments. The Browning Hi-Power has had a similarly lengthy period of military service outside the United States. The .50 caliber M2 Browning machine gun – the enduring "Ma Deuce" – was developed in 1918, entered service with the U.S. Armed Forces in 1921, and has remained in active service for over a century with militaries across the world in a variety of roles. The 37mm M4 autocannon was initially designed by Browning in 1921 and entered service in 1938; it was used both in aircraft and on U.S. Navy PT boats during World War II.

== Products ==
Several of Browning's designs are still in production today. Some of his most notable designs include:

Cartridges

- .25 ACP
- .32 ACP
- .38 ACP
- .380 ACP
- .45 ACP
- .50 BMG
- 9mm Browning Long

Pistols

- FN M1899/M1900 (.32 ACP)
- Colt Model 1900 (.38 ACP)
- Colt Model 1902 (.38 ACP)
- Colt Model 1903 Pocket Hammer (.38 ACP)
- FN Model 1903 (9mm Browning Long)
- Colt Model 1903 Pocket Hammerless (.32 ACP)
- Colt Model 1905 (.45 ACP)
- FN Model 1906 Vest Pocket (.25 ACP)
- Colt Model 1908 Vest Pocket (.25 ACP)
- Colt Model 1908 Pocket Hammerless (.380 ACP)
- FN Model 1910 (.32 ACP, .380 ACP)
- FN Model 1922 (.32 ACP) and (.380 ACP)
- U.S. M1911 pistol (.45 ACP)
- Browning Hi-Power (9mm Parabellum) started by Browning but completed by Dieudonné Saive at FN Herstal
- Colt Woodsman pistol (.22 LR)

Shotguns

- Ithaca Model 37 pump-action repeating shotgun
- Stevens Model 520/620 pump-action repeating shotgun
- Winchester Model 1887 lever-action repeating shotgun
- Winchester Model 1893 pump-action repeating shotgun
- Winchester Model 1897 pump-action repeating shotgun
- Winchester Model 1912 pump-action repeating shotgun
- Browning Auto-5 long-recoil semi-automatic shotgun, also produced as Savage Model 720
- Browning Superposed over/under shotgun
- Remington Model 17 pump-action repeating shotgun

Rifles

- Winchester Model 1885 falling-block single-shot rifle
- Winchester Model 1886 lever-action repeating rifle
- Winchester Model 1890 slide-action repeating rifle (.22 LR)
- Winchester Model 1892 lever-action repeating rifle
- Winchester Model 1894 lever-action repeating rifle
- Winchester Model 1895 lever-action repeating rifle
- Winchester Model 1900 bolt-action single-shot rifle (.22 LR)
- Remington Model 8 semi-auto rifle
- Browning 22 Semi-Auto rifle (.22 LR)
- Remington Model 24 semi-auto rifle (.22 LR)
- FN Trombone pump-action rifle (.22 LR)
- M1918 Browning Automatic Rifle (BAR) (.30-06)

Machine guns

- M1895 Colt–Browning machine gun air-cooled gas-operated machine gun
- M1917 Browning machine gun water-cooled recoil-operated machine gun
- M1919 Browning machine gun air-cooled recoil-operated machine gun
- M2 Browning machine gun .50-caliber heavy machine gun
- M4 cannon 37 mm automatic gun, work lapsed on death and not restarted until 1934

== Selected patents ==
- U.S. patent 220,271 Winchester 1885 single-shot rifle, Browning's first patent
- U.S. patent 306,577 Winchester 1886 and Model 71 lever-action rifles
- U.S. patent 336,287 Winchester Model 1887/1901 lever-action shotgun
- U.S. patent 385,238 Winchester 1890 pump-action rifle
- U.S. patent 441,390 Winchester 1893 and 1897 pump-action shotguns
- U.S. patent 465,339 Winchester 1892 lever-action rifle
- U.S. patent 524,702 Winchester 1894 lever-action rifle
- U.S. patent 544,657 Colt–Browning Model 1895 machine gun
- U.S. patent 549,345 Winchester 1895 lever-action rifle
- U.S. patent 580,924 Colt 1900 automatic pistol
- U.S. patent 632,094 Winchester 1900 bolt-action single-shot .22 rifle
- U.S. patent 689,283 Browning Auto-5 shotgun, also Remington Model 11 and Savage 720
- U.S. patent 659,786 Remington Model 8 semi-automatic rifle
- U.S. patent 678,937 M1917 Browning machine gun
- U.S. patent 747,585 Colt Model 1903 Pocket Hammerless automatic pistol
- U.S. patent 781,765U.S. patent 864,609 Stevens 520 pump-action shotgun
- U.S. patent 808,003 Colt Model 1905 in .45 ACP (predecessor to the M1911)
- U.S. patent 947,478 FN Model 1906 and Colt Model 1908 Vest Pocket in .25 ACP
- U.S. patent 984,519 Colt 1911
- U.S. patent 1,065,341 Browning 22 Semi-Auto rifle and Remington model 24
- U.S. patent 1,143,170 Remington Model 17 and Ithaca 37 pump-action shotguns
- U.S. patent 1,276,716 Colt Woodsman
- U.S. patent 1,293,022 Browning Automatic Rifle Model of 1918
- U.S. patent 1,424,553 FN "Trombone" pump action .22 caliber repeater (Rare in USA)
- U.S. patent 1,525,065 37 mm automatic cannons, M1 and M4
- U.S. patent 1,578,638 Browning Superposed over/under shotgun
- U.S. patent 1,618,510 FN and Browning Hi-Power pistol
- U.S. patent 1,628,226 M2 Browning machine gun in .50 BMG

== See also ==
- Browning Arms Company
- John Moses Browning House
- Charles Petter
- Sig Holding
- SIG Sauer
