= Winchester Model 1900 =

Bolt-action rifle

Winchester Model 1900 is a bolt-action single-shot .22 caliber rifle.

Winchester bought the design of the rifle from John Browning in 1899. The company modified Browning's original design to provide them with an inexpensive .22 caliber rifle. After the changes were made, the firearm was introduced to the market in August 1899 as the Winchester Single-Shot Rifle Model 1900.

The rifle was designed to handle .22 short or .22 long rim-fire cartridges. Consisting of only a few parts, the model is known as a takedown rifle, which means that it can be taken apart easily and quickly. The bolt action permits carrying the gun cocked without liability of the action jarring open. The rifle's barrel is round, 18 inches (460 mm) long, bored, and rifled for accurate shooting. The Model 1900 is fitted with open front and rear sights. The overall length is 33.25 inches (845 mm). It is cocked by pulling rearward on the firing pin head. The stock is made from gum wood, finished to show the grain and natural color of the wood, with a straight grip. The stock has no butt plate but the form of a butt plate was rolled into the butt end of the stock.

== See also ==
- Winchester bolt-action rifles
