= Val A. Browning =

American businessman (1895–1994)

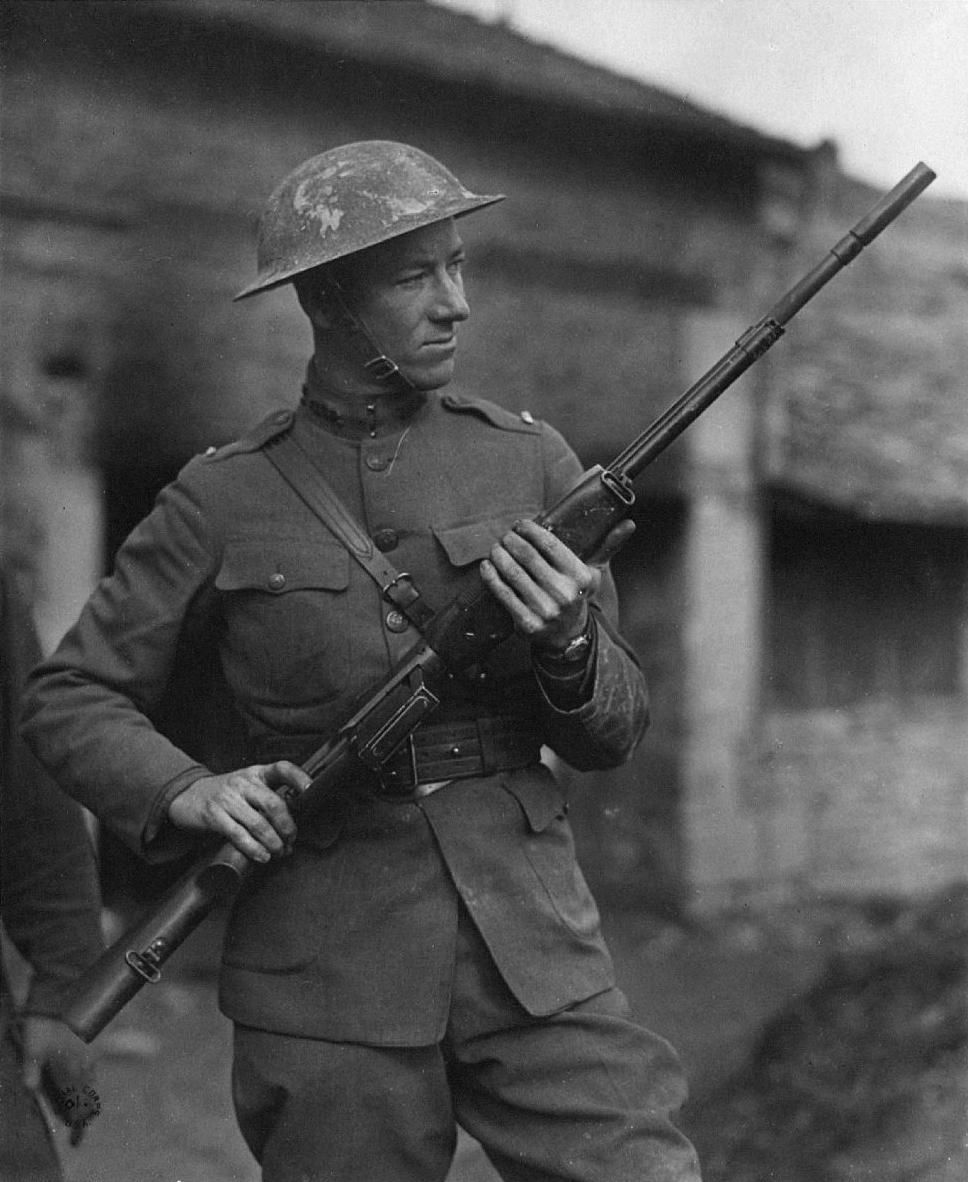
- Lt. Val Browning with the Browning Automatic Rifle
- Born: Val Allen Browning; August 20, 1895; Ogden, Utah Territory, U.S.
- Died: May 16, 1994 (aged 98); Ogden, Utah, U.S.
- Relatives: John Browning (father); Jonathan Browning (grandfather)
- Military career
- Allegiance: United States
- Branch: United States Army
- Service years: 1917–1918
- Rank: First Lieutenant
- Unit: 79th Infantry Division
- Conflicts: World War I
- Awards: Order of Leopold; World War I Victory Medal
- Other work: industrialist, philanthropist, gun manufacturer

Val Allen Browning (August 20, 1895 – May 16, 1994) was an American industrialist, philanthropist, and third-generation gunmaker. He was president of the Browning Arms Company.

== Early life ==
Browning was born in Ogden, Utah Territory on August 20, 1895. His grandfather, Jonathan Browning, opened a gun shop in Ogden in 1852. His father, John Browning, is regarded as one of the most successful firearms designers of the 19th and 20th centuries.

Browning graduated from Ogden High School in 1913 and later studied law and engineering at Cornell University. As a young man he worked in the shop his grandfather had opened.

In 1918, Browning was commissioned as a second lieutenant with the United States Army and served with the 79th Infantry Division at Verdun during World War I.

== Career ==
In 1920, he became the manager of the manufacturing of John Browning guns in Liège, Belgium, and served as his father's representative to Fabrique Nationale de Herstal. Upon his father's death in 1926, Browning had the responsibility of completing the projects that were not finished by his father, including the Browning Superposed shotgun and the Browning Hi-Power pistol (GP-35) (the latter in cooperation with his father's Belgian assistant, Dieudonné Saive).

In 1935, he returned to Utah as president of Browning Arms Company. Browning received 48 gun patents during his career. In 1955, he was awarded Knighthood in the Order of Léopold by King Baudouin of Belgium for an "outstanding contribution to the Gun Making Art."

Browning spent his career representing business interests in the United States and Europe. In addition to chairing Browning Arms, he served as director of the First Security Corporation, Utah International, Amalgamated Sugar Company, and the Mountain Fuel Supply Company. Through the 1940s purchase of some of W. L. Wattis' founding shares in Utah Construction Company, Browning shared in the substantial gains in the sale of Utah International.

== Personal life ==
In 1924, Browning married Ann Chaffin (1901–1975) of Farmington, Utah. They had four children. They lived in Belgium until 1935 when they returned to Utah.

He was a member of the Church of Jesus Christ of Latter-day Saints. Browning was a benefactor of Dixie College and Weber State University. His substantial collection of European fine art formed the basis of the Utah Museum of Fine Arts masterwork paintings.

Browning died May 16, 1994, and was buried at Lindquist Washington Heights Memorial Park in Ogden, Utah.
