= Colt Woodsman =

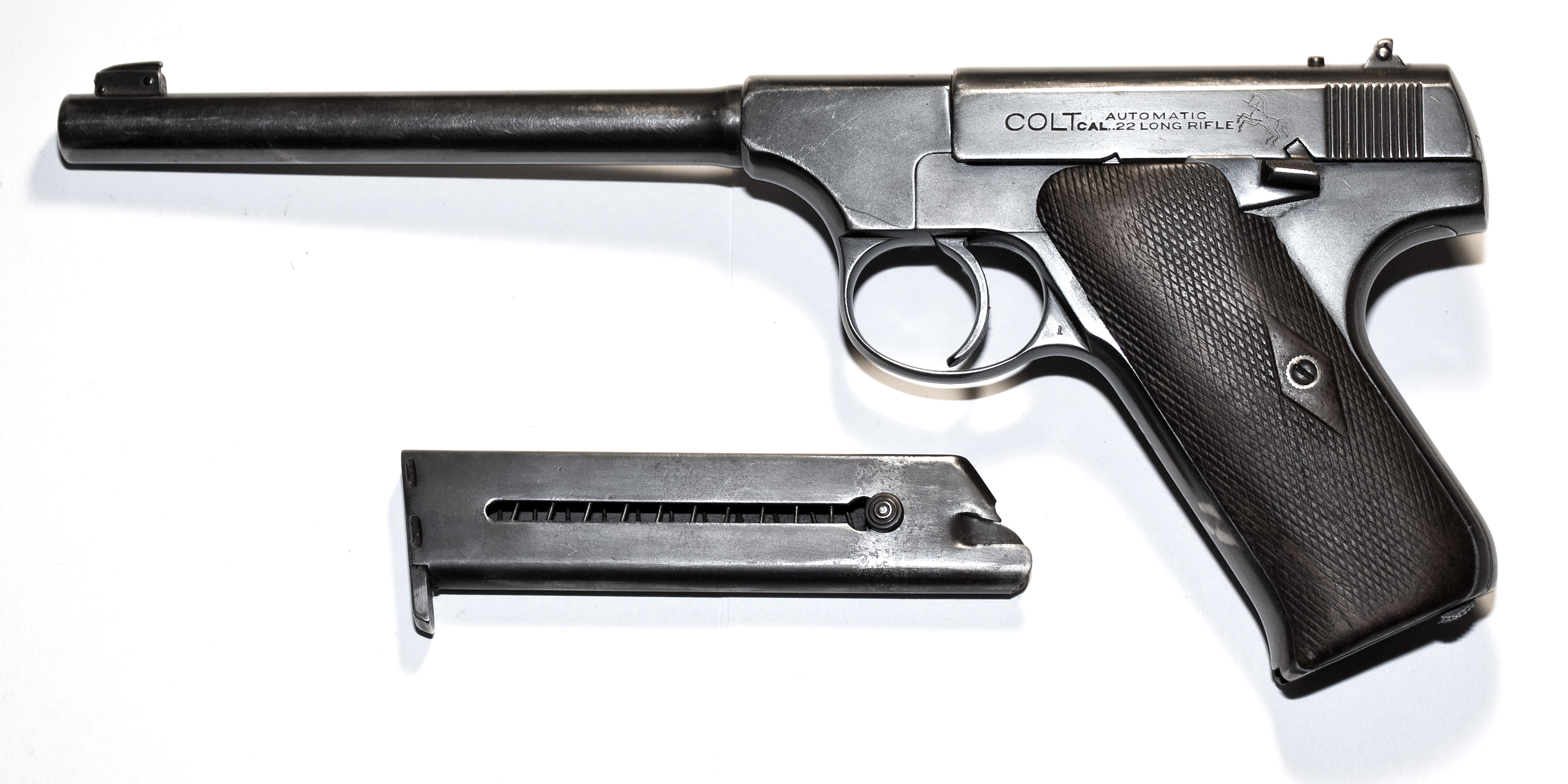
- An early first series Colt Woodsman pistol and magazine.
- Type: Semi-automatic pistol
- Place of origin: United States

Production history
- Designer: John Browning
- Manufacturer: Colt's Manufacturing Company
- Produced: 1915–1977
- No. built: ~690,000
- Variants: Colt Woodsman Match Target (1938–1977); Colt Challenger (1950–1955); Colt Huntsman (1955–1976)

Specifications
- Mass: ~30 oz (0.85 kg)
- Length: 9 in (23 cm); 10.5 in (27 cm); 11.125 in (28.26 cm)
- Barrel length: 4.5 in (11 cm); 6 in (15 cm); 6.625 in (16.83 cm)
- Cartridge: .22 Long Rifle
- Action: Semi-automatic
- Feed system: 10-round box magazine
- Sights: Iron sights

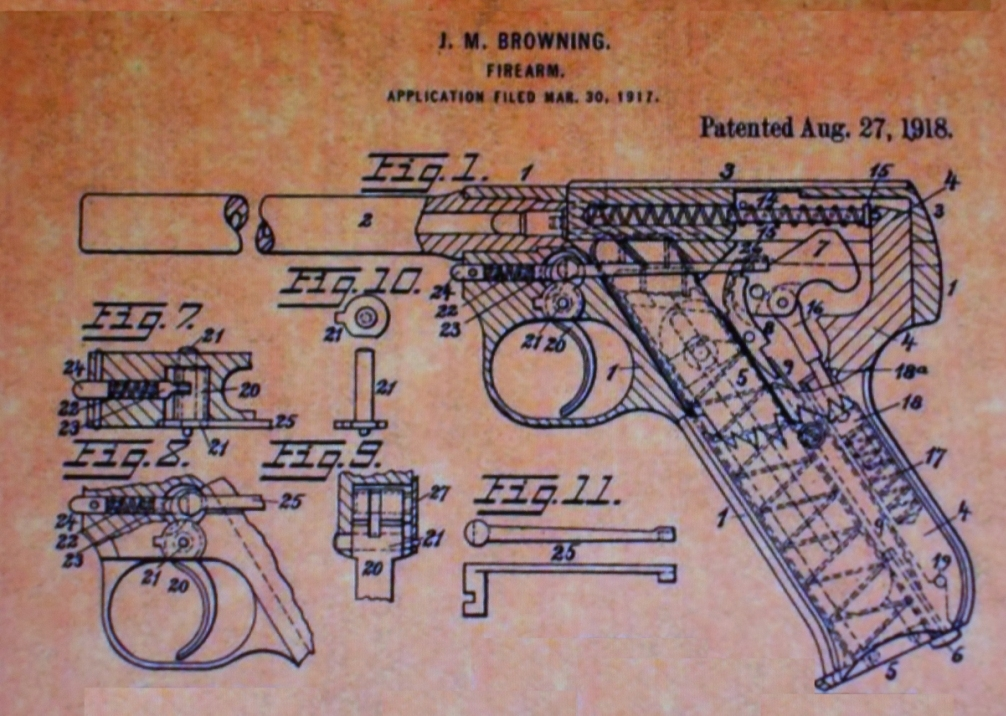
Brownings 1918 Patent of the .22 Colt Woodsman Target Pistol

The Colt Woodsman is a semi-automatic sporting pistol manufactured by the U.S. Colt's Manufacturing Company from 1915 to 1977. It was designed by John Moses Browning. The frame design changed over time, in three distinct series: series one being 1915–1941, series two being 1947–1955, and series three being 1955–1977.

== Design ==
The Colt Woodsman sprang from a design by John Moses Browning and was refined by gunsmiths and designers at Colt's before its introduction in 1915.

Browning developed the Woodsman with a short slide, no grip safety and no hammer. These features were in place on his Model 1903 and 1911 designs, but a handgun intended for target use did not require them.

== Variants and versions ==
There are three series of the Colt Woodsman and each series had three models: Target, Sport and Match Target.

=== First Series 1915–1941 ===
The Target Model was the base model and featured a 6-inch barrel with adjustable front and rear sights. It was not until 1927 that the name "Woodsman" was used.

The Sport Model was designed as a field sidearm for hiking and camping in 1933 and had a 4.5-inch barrel. Original versions were made with a fixed front sight in the first series, but by the latter half of production, an adjustable sight was available.

The Match Target Model debuted in 1938 and featured a heavier barrel with a one-piece wraparound grip known as the "elephant ear." A "Bullseye" Icon was rollmarked into the slide lending the nickname "Bullseye Match Target".

In 1941, the US entered World War II, Colt ceased civilian production of the Woodsman but delivered 4,000 Match Target models to the US Government as late as 1945. These pistols had oversized plastic two-piece grips and were marked "Property US Government", but appeared on the surplus market after the war.

=== Second Series 1948–1955 ===
Colt resumed production of the Woodsman in 1948. The three Models remained the same, but were built on a longer heavier frame and had a magazine safety, automatic slide stop and magazine release located at the rear of the trigger guard. Colt also introduced the less expensive Challenger model, which came equipped with fixed sights and featured a magazine release near bottom aft side of the grip.

Special versions were made for the United States Marine Corps (100 Match Target Models and 2,500 Sport Models), United States Air Force (925 Target Models), and United States Coast Guard (75 Match Target Models). The Air Force models had no special markings, and most were sold as surplus through the Director of Civilian Marksmanship Program. The bulk of the Marine and Coast Guard versions were destroyed and sold as scrap metal.

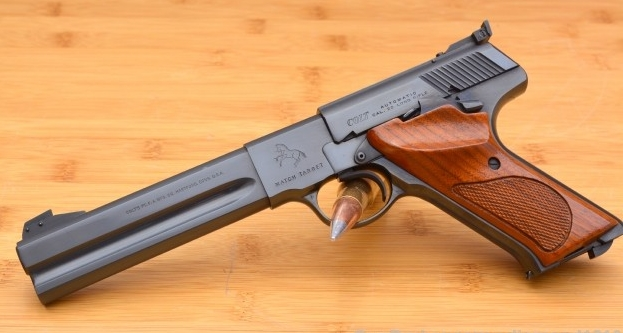
Colt Woodsman Match Target

=== Third Series 1955–1977 ===
Colt changed the design of the Woodsman in 1955. The three models remained the same, but the markings, grips, and sights underwent slight changes. The most significant was relocating the magazine release from the rear of the trigger guard to the heel of the grip as on the first series. Colt also introduced new models, such as the less expensive Huntsman Model equipped with fixed sights. From 1960 walnut stocks with a thumbrest were optional, in place of the standard black plastic stocks.

== References to the Colt Woodsman in American literature ==
Screenwriter and author Raymond Chandler: "They came out at me, almost side by side, from the dressing room beside the wall bed - two of them - with guns. The tall one was grinning. He had his hat low on his forehead and he had a wedge-shaped face that ended in a point, like the bottom of the ace of diamonds. He had moist eyes and a nose so bloodless that it might have been made of white wax. His gun was a Colt Woodsman with a long barrel and the front sight filed off. That meant he thought he was good."

Novelist Ernest Hemingway: The rifle and the pistol are still the equalizer when one man is more of a man than another, and if…he is really smart…he will get a permit to carry one and then drop around to Abercrombie and Fitch and buy himself a .22 caliber Colt automatic pistol, Woodsman model, with a five-inch barrel and a box of shells...Now standing in one corner of a boxing ring with a .22 caliber Colt automatic pistol, shooting a bullet weighing only 40 grains and with a striking energy of 51 foot pounds at 25 feet from the muzzle, I will guarantee to kill either [boxer] Gene Tunney or Joe Louis before they get to me from the opposite corner. This is the smallest caliber pistol cartridge made; but it is also one of the most accurate and easy to hit with, since the pistol has no recoil. I have killed many horses with it, cripples and bear baits, with a single shot, and what will kill a horse will kill a man...Yet this same pistol bullet fired at point blank range will not dent a grizzly’s skull, and to shoot a grizzly with a .22 caliber pistol would simply be one way of committing suicide."

== See also ==
- List of firearms
- Ruger Standard
