= M1917 bayonet =

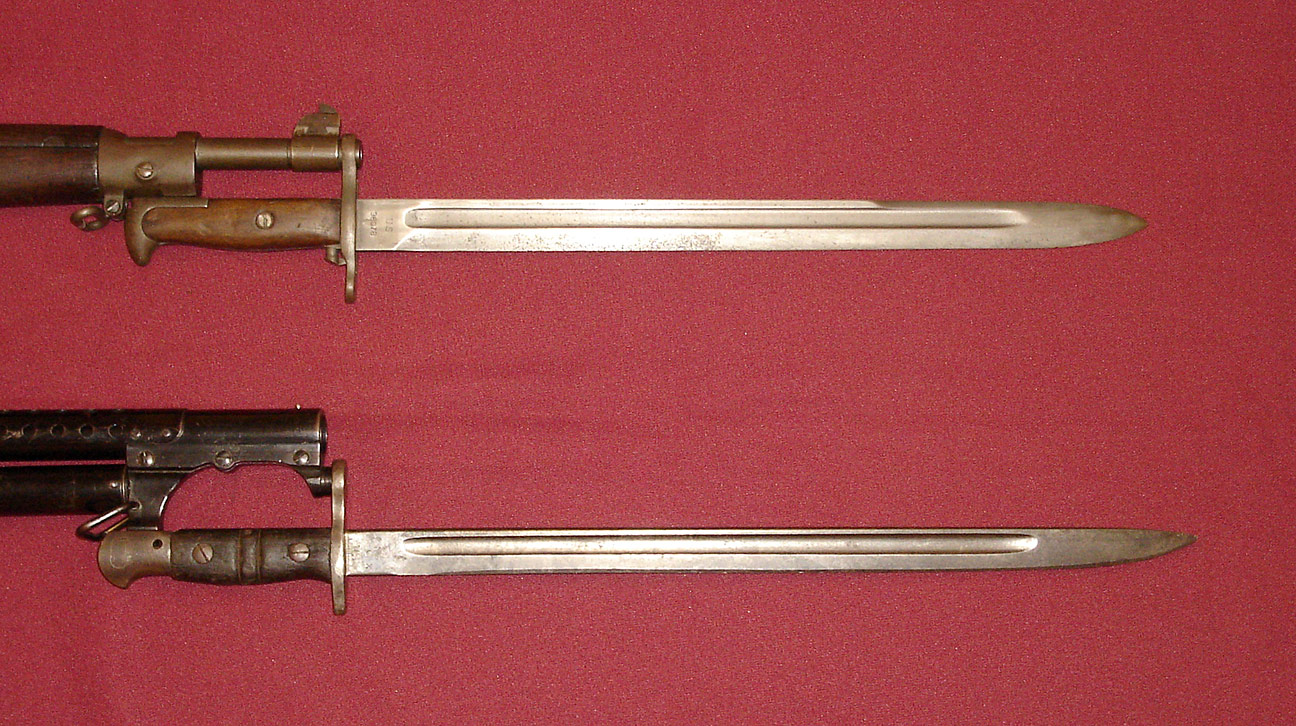
- U.S. military bayonets of the Great War (World War I). Shown is the U.S. Bayonet M1905 affixed to the 1903 Springfield Rifle and the U.S. Bayonet M1917 affixed to the Model 12 Winchester Trenchgun (12 gauge pump shotgun).
- Type: Sword bayonet

Service history
- Used by: United States; United Kingdom
- Wars: World War I Banana Wars; World War II; Korean War; Vietnam War

Production history
- Manufacturer: Remington Arms; Winchester Arms; Eddystone Arms; General Cutlery; Canadian Arsenals Limited.
- Produced: 1910s–1930s, 1960s
- No. built: ~2,000,000

Specifications
- Mass: 1.2 lb (540 g)
- Length: 22 in (56 cm)
- Blade length: 17 in (43 cm)
- Scabbard/sheath: M1917 scabbard

The M1917 bayonet was a bayonet designed to be used with the US M1917 Enfield .30 caliber rifle, as well as seven different models of U.S. trench shotguns. The blade was 17 in (43 cm) long with an overall length of 22 in (56 cm). It does not fit the M1903 .30 caliber (Springfield) or the M1 .30 caliber (Garand) US service rifles as they have different bayonet ring (barrel) and attachment stud dimensions.

== History ==
The M1917 bayonet was used first during World War I by American soldiers on the Western Front. A sword bayonet design, the M1917 bayonet design was based on the British Pattern 1913 bayonet, itself derived from the Pattern 1907 bayonet, which incorporated a long 17 in (43 cm) blade. While designed primarily for the M1917 rifle, the bayonet was fitted for use on all the "trench" shotguns at the time. The M1917 bayonet, being a direct copy of the British P14 bayonet, retained the transverse cuts in the grip panels. These panels served to differentiate the P1914 bayonet from the P1907 bayonet in British service as the only difference between the two was the height of the muzzle ring. In US service these transverse cuts served no official purpose. US surcharged P1914 bayonets exist and will exhibit the British proofs being cancelled out and US marks applied.

The M1917 was used frequently during the several different Banana Wars.

The U.S. continued to use the World War I-made M1917 bayonets during World War II because of large stockpiles left over. The new trench guns being procured and issued were still designed to use the old M1917 bayonet.

The bayonet was again called on during the Korean War for issue with the various trench guns still in service.

In 1966 procurement orders were let for brand new production M1917 bayonets. The contracts were issued to General Cutlery of Fremont, Ohio, and Canadian Arsenals Ltd., the old Long Branch Arsenal of Quebec, Canada. Stockpiles had finally run out, and new Winchester 1200 trench shotguns were being issued. These were used in limited quantities during the Vietnam War.

It was not until towards the end of the Vietnam War that new military shotguns were designed to use the newer knife bayonets. Such as the Stevens Model 77E with the M5 Bayonet, or the United States Marine Corps "Model 870 Mark 1" shotgun with the M7 bayonet.

M1917 bayonets were still in used by the US Army as late as the early 2000s for use with the M1200 shotgun.

== Usage ==
- M1917 rifle
- P14 rifle
- Winchester Model 1897 trench gun
- Winchester Model 1912 trench gun
- Stevens Model 520-30 trench gun
- Stevens Model 620 trench gun
- Remington Model 10 trench gun
- Ithaca Model 37 trench gun
- Winchester Model 1200 trench gun

== See also ==
- List of individual weapons of the U.S. Armed Forces
- Type 30 bayonet
- M1905 bayonet
