= Remington Model 870 =

Pump-action shotgun made by Remington Arms Company

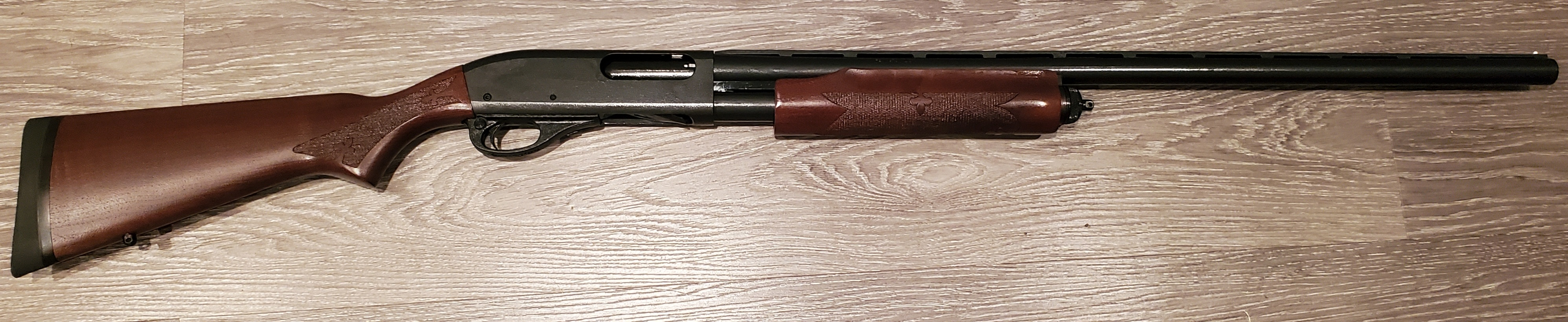
- A Model 870 Fieldmaster
- Type: Pump-action shotgun
- Place of origin: United States

Service history
- In service: 1950–present
- Used by: See Users
- Wars: Vietnam War; Rhodesian Bush War; Lebanese Civil War; War in Afghanistan; Iraq War

Production history
- Designer: L.Ray Crittendon, Phillip Haskell, Ellis Hailston, G.E. Pinckney
- Designed: 1950
- Manufacturer: Remington Arms
- Unit cost: $350
- Produced: 1951–present
- No. built: 11,000,000+
- Variants: See Variants

Specifications
- Mass: 7.0 lb (3.2 kg) to 8.0 lb (3.6 kg)
- Length: 26.3 in (670 mm) to 50.5 in (1,280 mm)
- Barrel length: 14 in (360 mm) to 30 in (760 mm)
- Cartridge: 12 gauge, 16 gauge, 20 gauge, 28 gauge, or .410 bore
- Action: Pump-action
- Feed system: 3+1, 4+1, 5+1, 6+1, or 7+1 round internal tube magazine, or an external 6+1 box magazine
- Sights: Bead, twin bead, adjustable open sights, or ghost ring (all iron sights). Also cantilever and receiver-mounts for scopes

The Remington Model 870 is a pump-action shotgun manufactured by Remington Arms Company, LLC. which became one of their most popular firearms, and has remained so to this day. It is widely used by the public for shooting sports, hunting and self-defense, as well as by law enforcement and military organizations worldwide.

== Development ==
The Remington 870 was the fourth major design in a series of Remington pump shotguns. John Pedersen designed the fragile Remington Model 10 (and later the improved Remington Model 29). John Browning designed the Remington Model 17 (which was later adapted by Ithaca into the Ithaca 37), which served as the basis for the Remington 31. The Model 31 was marketed as the “ball-bearing repeater” and was well-received, but its many machined and hand-fitted parts made the gun expensive to manufacture. Consequently, it struggled in sales compared to the Winchester Model 12. To achieve better sales, Remington produced the Model 870 in 1950, which was more modern and reliable in its construction, easy to take apart and maintain, and relatively inexpensive.

The 870 was a commercial success. Remington sold two million guns by 1973 (ten times the number of Model 31 shotguns it replaced). As of 1983, the 870 held the record for the best-selling shotgun in history, with three million sold. By 1996, spurred by sales of the basic "Express" models, which were added as a lower-cost alternative to the original Wingmaster line, sales topped seven million guns. On April 13, 2009, the ten millionth Model 870 was produced.

== Design details ==
The 870 features a bottom-loading, side ejecting receiver and a tubular magazine under the barrel. The gun comes with a plug for migratory bird hunting which reduces the magazine's capacity to two rounds. It has dual action bars, internal hammer, and a bolt which locks into an extension in the barrel. The action, receiver, fire control group, safety catch and slide release catch of the Remington Model 870 shotgun are similar to those used on the Remington Model 7600 series pump-action centerfire rifles and carbines. The basic fire control group design was first used in the automatic 11–48. Twelve gauge stocks will also interchange on the older 12-gauge-sized 20-gauge receivers, although modification is needed to fit the smaller sized 20-gauge receivers employed since the late 1970s. Several parts of the 870, such as buttstocks and magazine tubes, will interchange with the semi-automatic Remington 1100 and 11–87.

The original 870 models were offered with fixed chokes. In 1986 Remington introduced the new Remington "Rem Choke" system of screw-in chokes (also fitted to Remington model 1100 auto-loading shotguns at the same time). Initially, the Rem Chokes were offered only in 12 gauge in barrel lengths of 21, 26 and 28 in (530, 660 and 710 mm). The following year the availability was expanded to the 20 gauge and included other barrel lengths.

The 870's production for over 30 years had a design flaw whereby a user could fail to press a shell all the way into the magazine when loading – so that the shell latch did not engage the shell – which could result in tying up the gun. This was caused by the shell slipping out of the magazine under the bolt in the receiver to bind the action, requiring rough treatment of the action or even disassembly. The potential issue was resolved with the introduction of the "Flexi Tab" carrier. Guns with this modification can be identified by the U-shaped cut-out on the carrier, visible from below the gun. The cut-out, combined with modified machining on the underside of the slide assembly, allows the action to be opened with a shell on the carrier.

== Variants ==
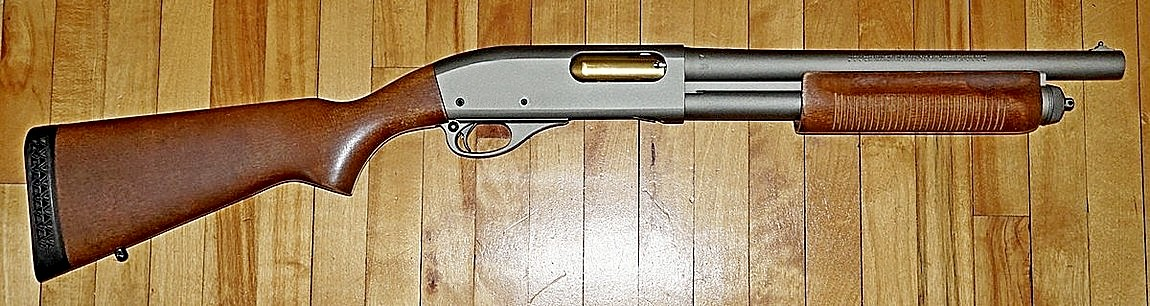
Remington 870 Police Magnum 14 inch barrel (customize painted with cerakote color "Gunmetal")

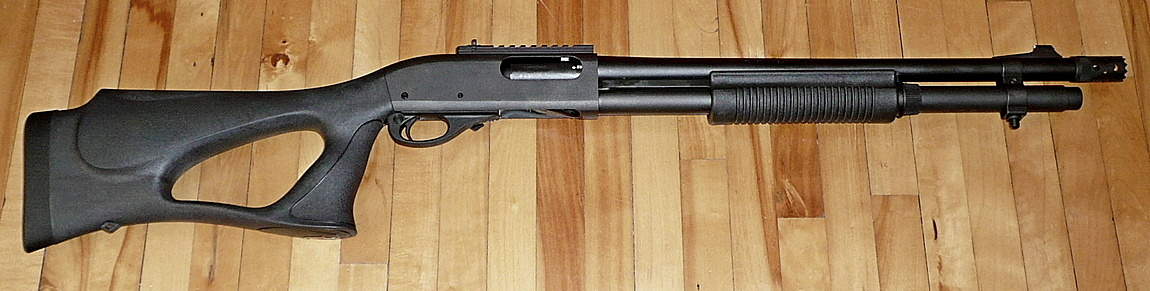
Remington 870 Express Tactical fitted with aftermarket Remington ShurShot stock.

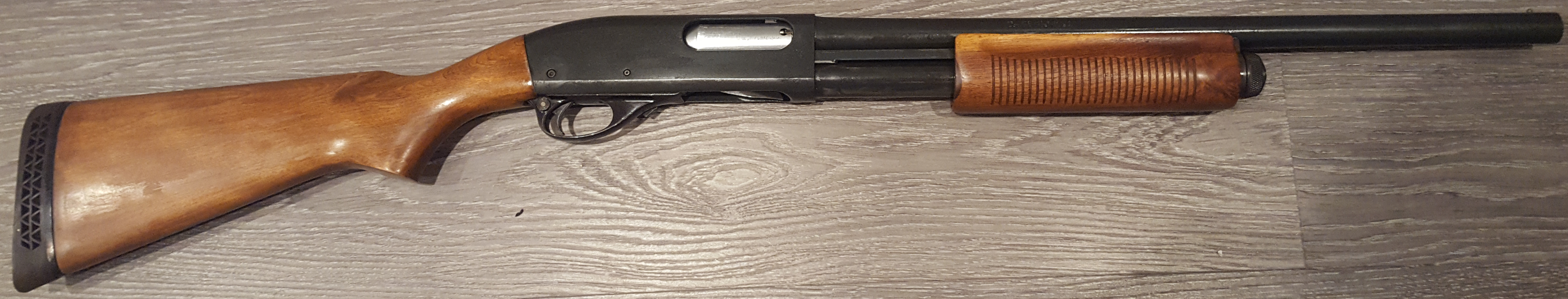
Remington Model 870 Wingmaster with 20" Home Defense barrel.

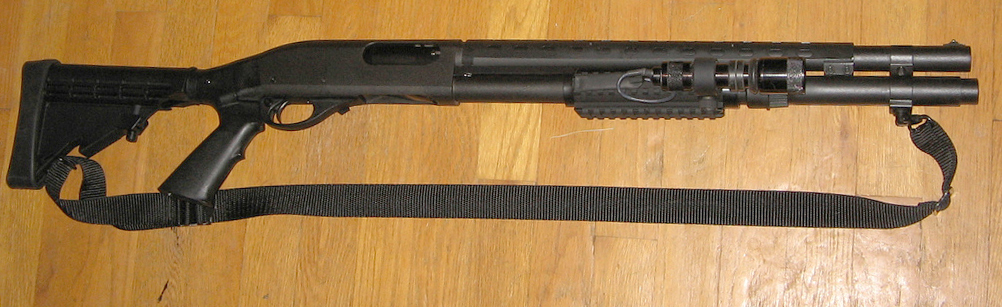
Remington 870 fitted with a pistol grip, Surefire light, and M4-type stock

There are hundreds of variations of the Remington 870 in 12, 16, 20, 28 gauges and .410 bore. All Remington 870 versions are built on the same platform and receiver, but there are small differences that can be more than just cosmetic. In 1969, Remington introduced 28 gauge and .410 bore models on a new scaled-down receiver size, and in 1972, a 20-gauge Lightweight ("LW") version was introduced on the same sized receiver, and all of the smaller gauges today are produced on that size receiver. From the original fifteen models offered, Remington currently produces dozens of models for civilian, law enforcement, and military sales.

The maximum shell length that can be used in a Remington 870 depends on the barrel and receiver of the particular model. While the receiver length determines whether a shell will feed, the chamber length in the barrel determines if it will be safe to fire. For 12 gauge 870s, the maximum shell length is 2 3/4 in (70 mm) for non-magnums, 3 in (76 mm) for magnums, and 3 1/2 in (89 mm) for super magnums. Since barrels can be changed, it is important to also check the barrel markings to ensure the chosen cartridge length is safe to use.

870 variants can be grouped into the following:

Model	Gauge	Barrel Length	Barrel Type	Description
FieldMaster Deer	12-gauge	20 in (510 mm)	Fully rifled	20-inch fully rifled barrel with adjustable rifle sights. Satin black finish with walnut stock and fore-end with rubber recoil pad.
410 Turkey TSS	.410-bore	25 in (640 mm)	Vent Rib, Rem Choke	Extended full choke, TRUGLO rail system. Receiver milled for maximum strength and reliability.
Turkey Camo	12-gauge	21 in (530 mm)	Vent Rib, Rem Choke	Pump action with full Rem Choke. Matte black finish on barrel and receiver. Synthetic stock. Shoots both 2 3/4" and 3".
SPS Superslug	12-gauge	25 1/2 in (650 mm)	Fully rifled extra heavy (fluted)	Drilled and tapped sights, Matte black finish. Synthetic stock.
Fieldmaster	12-gauge, 20-gauge	28, 26, 21, 18.75, 26 and 20 in (711, 660, 533, 476, 660 and 508 mm)	Vent rib Rem Choke and fully rifled	Bead and rifle sights, satin black carbon steel receiver finish, American walnut satin stock finish.
Fieldmaster Synthetic	12-gauge, 20-gauge	28, 26, 21, 21 and 20 in (710, 660, 530, 530 and 510 mm)	Vent rib Rem Choke and fully rifled	Bead and rifle sights, satin blue receiver finish, matte black synthetic stock finish.
Special Purpose Marine Magnum	12-gauge	18 1/2 in (470 mm)	Cylinder choke	Corrosion resistant utility gun with synthetic stock.
SPS Super Mag Turkey Predator	12-gauge (2 3/4", 3" and 3 1/2")	20 in (510 mm)	Rem Choke	Slide action with pistol grip stock and black overmolded grip panels.
Super Magnum Flyaway	12-gauge (2 3/4", 3" and 3 1/2")	28 in (710 mm)	Vent rib, Rem Choke	Slide action with innovative bolt design keeps cycle stroke equal for all 3 lengths of shotshells.
Super Magnum Turkey/Waterfowl Camo	12-gauge (2 3/4", 3" and 3 1/2")	26 in (660 mm)	Vent rib, Rem Choke	Pump shotgun with camo coverage.
Wingmaster	12-gauge (2 3/4" and 3"), 20-gauge, and .410-bore	25–28 in (640–710 mm)	Vent Rib, Rem Choke	Satin finish on stock and fore-end. American walnut woodwork. Receiver and barrel are polished blue.
Fieldmaster Fully Rifled Cantilever	12-gauge	20 in (510 mm)	Fully rifled	Fully rifled barrel with black satin finish and walnut stock with fore-end rubber recoil pads.

=== Unlicensed copies ===
Chinese arms company Norinco has made unlicensed copies of the Remington 870, as the design is no longer under patent protection.

== Users ==
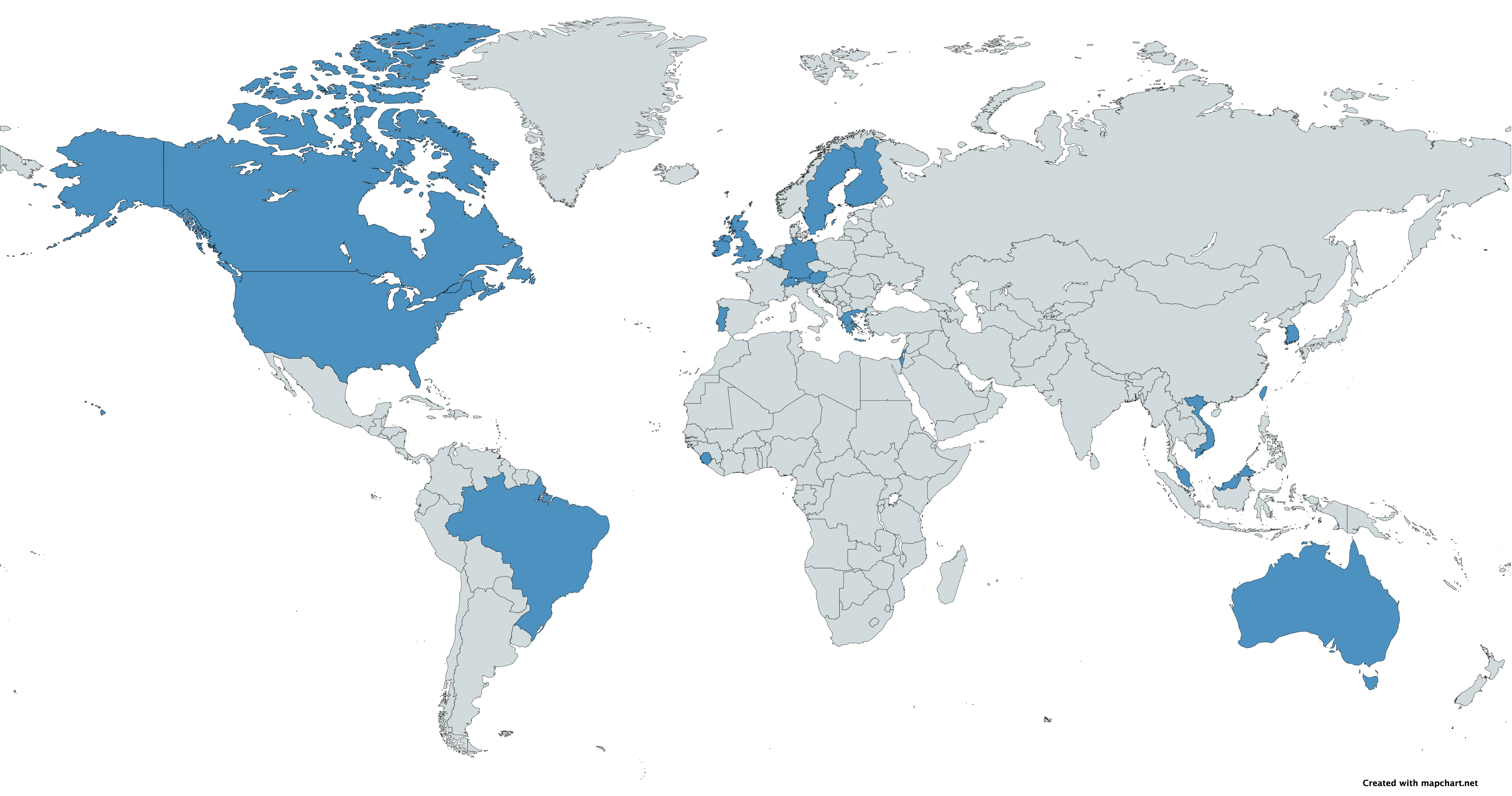
A map with Remington Model 870 users in blue

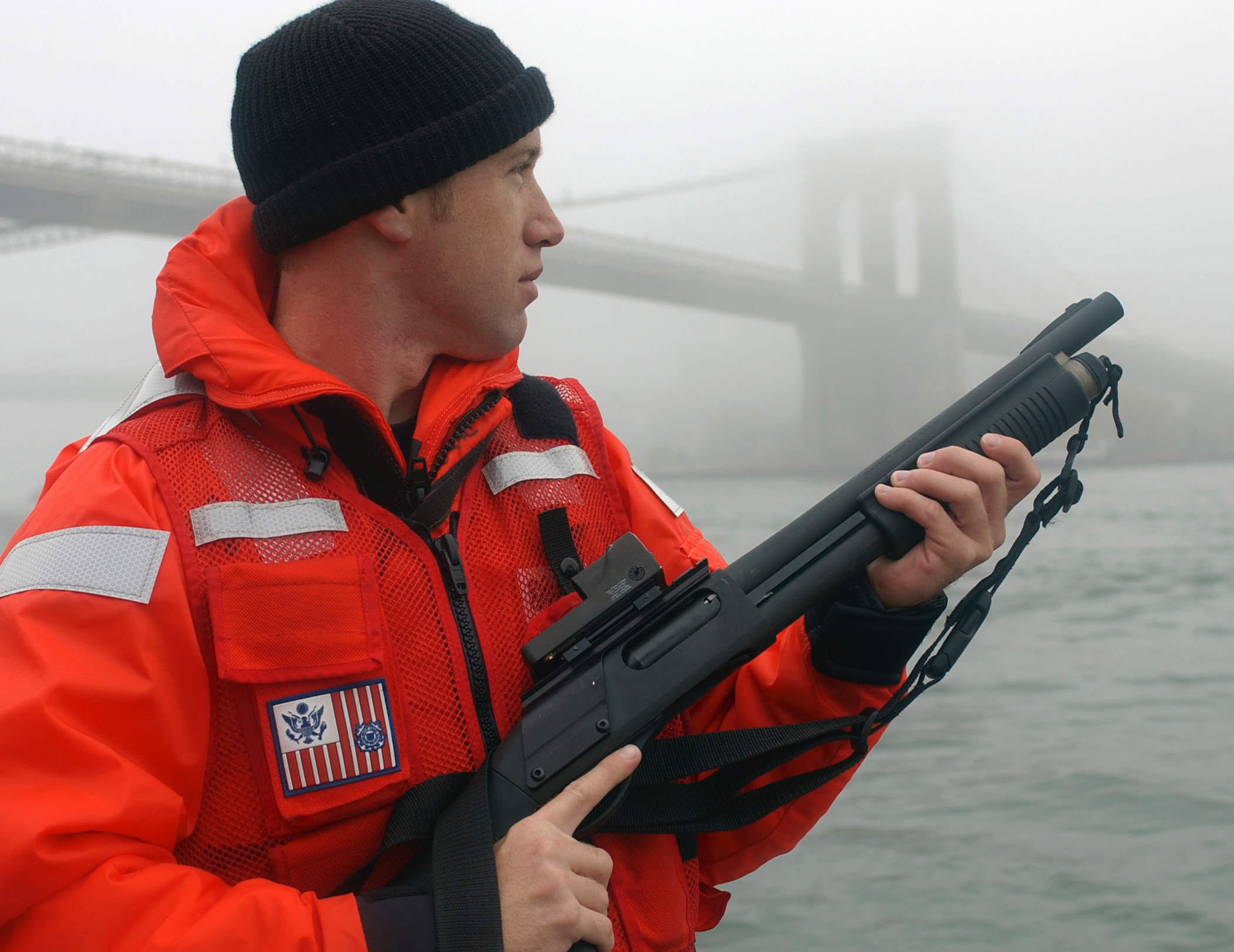
A U.S. Coast Guard petty officer from Maritime Safety and Security Team 91106 armed with an Mk870P fitted with a Trijicon RX01 reflex sight and a Speedfeed stock

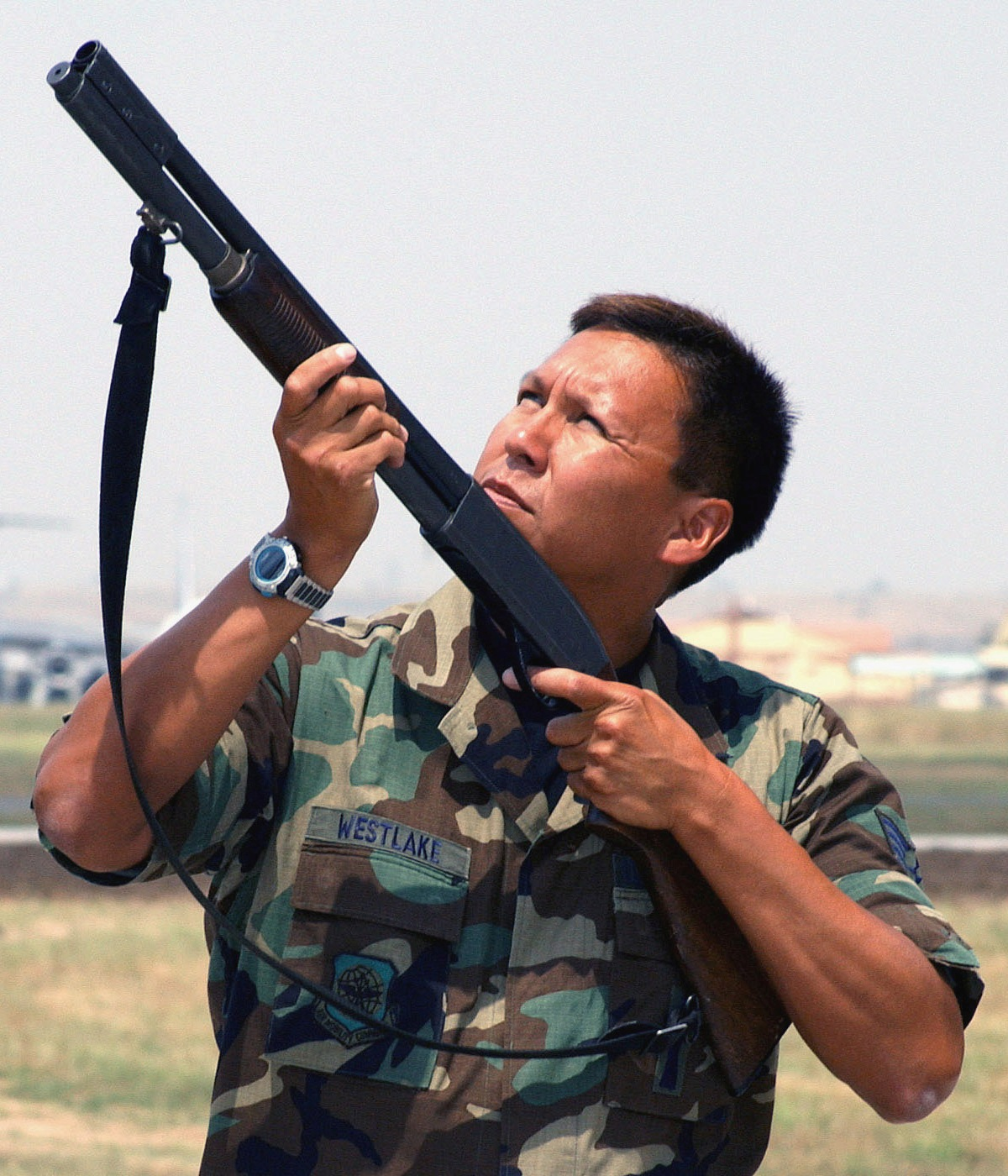
The Remington 870 12-gauge shotgun loaded with pyrotechnical shells (blanks) is seen here used as a last resort to scare off unwanted birds in flight from the vicinity of Incirlik Air Base

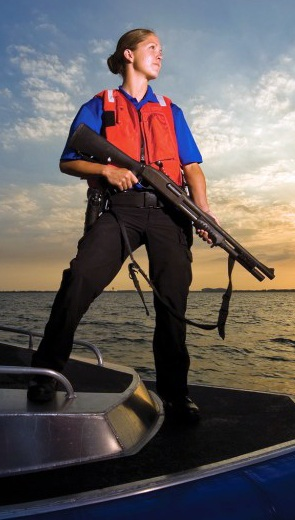
A U.S. Air Force Security Forces Marine Patrol airman from MacDill AFB with an M870

Country	Organization name	Quantity	Date	Reference
Australia	Australian Defence Force	_	_	
Austria	EKO Cobra	_	_	
Austria	Austrian armed forces	_	_	
Belgium	Federal Police Special Units	_	_	
Belgium	Belgian Armed Forces	_	2008	
Brazil	First Special Forces Battalion (BFEsp)	_	_	
Canada	Canadian Armed Forces	_	_	
Canada	Correctional Service Canada (CSC-SCC)	_	_	
Canada	Royal Canadian Mounted Police (RCMP)	_	_	
Canada	Canadian Coast Guard (CCG)	_	_	
Canada	Ontario Provincial Police (OPP)	_	_	
Canada	London Police Service (LPS)	_		
Finland	Finnish Army (designated pumppuhaulikko 12 HAUL REM 870)	_	_	
Germany	Bundeswehr, GSG 9, and Spezialeinsatzkommandos	_	_	
Greece	EKAM counter-terrorist unit of the Hellenic Police	_	_	
British Hong Kong	Royal Hong Kong Regiment	_	_	
Ireland	Army Ranger Wing, Special Detective Unit, Emergency Response Unit	_	2000	
Israel	Israel Defense Forces and YAMAM	_	_	
Luxembourg	Unité Spéciale de la Police group of the Grand Ducal Police	_	_	
Malaysia	Various special operations such as: Grup Gerak Khas; JMF Elite Forces; Pasukan Khas Laut (PASKAL); Pasukan Khas Udara (PASKAU); Pasukan Gerakan Khas; Unit Gempur Marin; Grup Taktikal Khas	_	_	
Portugal	Portuguese Marine Corps	_	_	
Sierra Leone	Sierra Leone Police	51+	After 2001	
Sweden	Swedish Armed Forces (designated "Förstärkningsvapen 870")	_	_	
Switzerland	Swiss Armed Forces (designated Mehrzweckgewehr 91; MzGw 91)	_	_	
South Korea	Republic of Korea Navy Special Warfare Brigade	_	_	
Taiwan	Taiwan Coast Guard, Taiwan Reserve Army (T85 Shotgun)	_	_	
United Kingdom	United Kingdom Special Forces (designated L74A1), Police Service of Northern Ireland and Specialist Firearms Officers as a breaching weapon	_	_	
United States	U.S. Border Patrol	_	_	
United States	U.S. Department of Education	27	2010	
United States	U.S. Military (designated M870)	_	_	
United States	U.S. Secret Service	1,600	2001	
United States	Federal Bureau of Investigation	-	-	
United States	Internal Revenue Service	60	2010	
United States	Various police forces such as: California Highway Patrol (since 1965); Cambridge Police Department (Massachusetts); Los Angeles Police Department; Sparta, New Jersey; Alaska Department of Corrections; Pennsylvania State Police	2 (Cambridge PD)	_	
Vietnam	Mobile Police Force (Canh Sat Co Dong)	_	_	

=== Non-state users ===
- Lebanese Forces

== See also ==
- Combat shotgun
- Knight's Armament Company Masterkey
- List of individual weapons of the U.S. Armed Forces
