= Downward ejection =

Firearm design concept

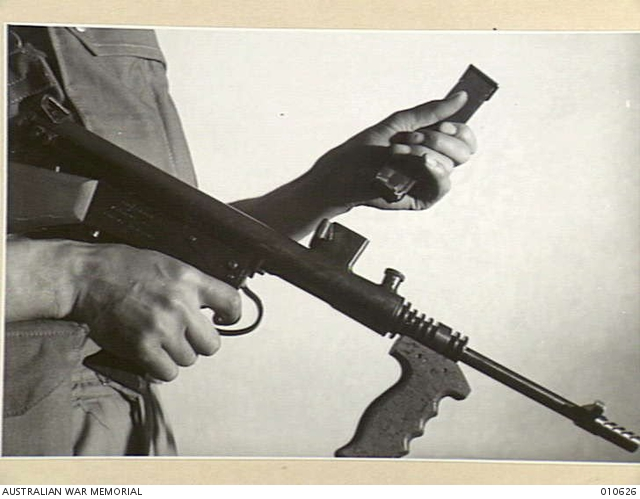
The Owen gun is an example that uses downward ejection for spent brass

In firearms, downward ejecting refers to firearms which eject spent cases downward from the firearm's receiver, rather than the more conventional designs which eject the brass to the side. This feature simplifies use by left-handers, and can help prevent gases and debris from being ejected near the shooter's face.

== Examples ==
- AR-57
- Atlas Engineering MBAR
- Bren light machine gun
- Browning M1917/M1919 and M2HB
- Browning BPS shotgun
- Browning Semi Automatic 22
- Calico Light Weapons Systems
- F1 submachine gun
- F.N. Calibre 13,2 mm
- FN P90 submachine gun
- Flieger-Doppelpistole 1919
- Ithaca M37 shotgun
- Kel-Tec KS7 shotgun
- Kel-Tec KSG shotgun
- Kel-Tec RDB rifle
- MG 34, MG 42 and MG 3 machine gun
- MG 81 machine gun
- Owen machine carbine
- Remington Model 10 shotgun
- Remington Model 17 shotgun
- Remington Model 105CTi shotgun
- S&T Motiv K16
- SIG MG 710-3
- Springfield Light Rifle
- Smith & Wesson M&P 12 shotgun
- Smith & Wesson Model 1940 Light Rifle
- Sumitomo Type 62
- TKB-059 rifle
- TKB-072 rifle
- Type 89 machine gun
- Type 100 machine gun
- Villar Perosa aircraft submachine gun
- American-180 submachine gun

== See also ==
- Glossary of firearms terms
