= Winchester Model 1200 =

Winchester Model 1200/1300
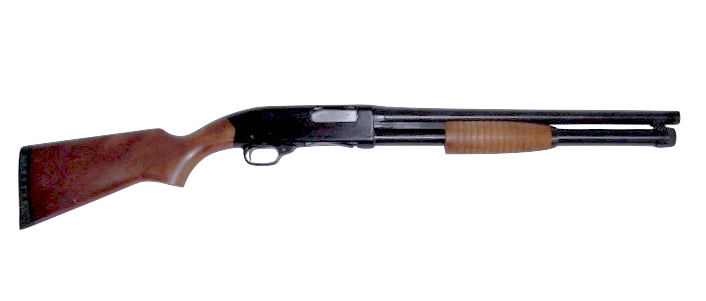
- Winchester Model 1200 Defender with extended tube magazine
- Type: Pump-action shotgun
- Place of origin: United States

Service history
- In service: 1964–present
- Wars: Vietnam War; Operation Urgent Fury; United States invasion of Panama; Somali Civil War; Gulf War; War in Afghanistan; Iraq War

Production history
- Manufacturer: Winchester
- Produced: 1964–2006 (1200 and 1300 only) 2009–Onwards (Winchester SXP)

Specifications
- Action: Pump-action, rotating bolt
- Feed system: Tubular magazine

The Model 1200 is a pump-action shotgun that was manufactured by the Winchester-Western Division of Olin Corporation, starting in 1964. It was redesignated the Model 1300 in 1978 with minimal changes. Production ceased in 2006 when the U.S. Repeating Arms Company, the subsequent manufacturer, went bankrupt. A militarized version of the Model 1200 was acquired by the U.S. Army for use during the Vietnam War. It is still in active service within various conflicts throughout the 21st century.

== History ==
The Winchester Model 1200 was introduced in 1964 as a lower-cost replacement for the Model 12. The Model 1300 was introduced in 1978 with minimal changes, mainly to furniture design and finish. In 1983, when U.S. Repeating Arms Company became the manufacturer of Winchester firearms, production of the Model 1300 continued. By 1992, 2.5 million units of the gun (all models) had been produced. Production of the Model 1300 ceased in 2006, when the U.S. Repeating Arms Company went bankrupt.

== SXP ==
In 2009, Fabrique Nationale d'Herstal (FN) commenced production of the Winchester SXP, based on the Model 1300.

=== SXP shotgun recall ===
In April 2015, the company recalled several variants of its SXP-model 12-gauge shotguns that the company says may unintentionally fire while the action is being closed.

== Design ==
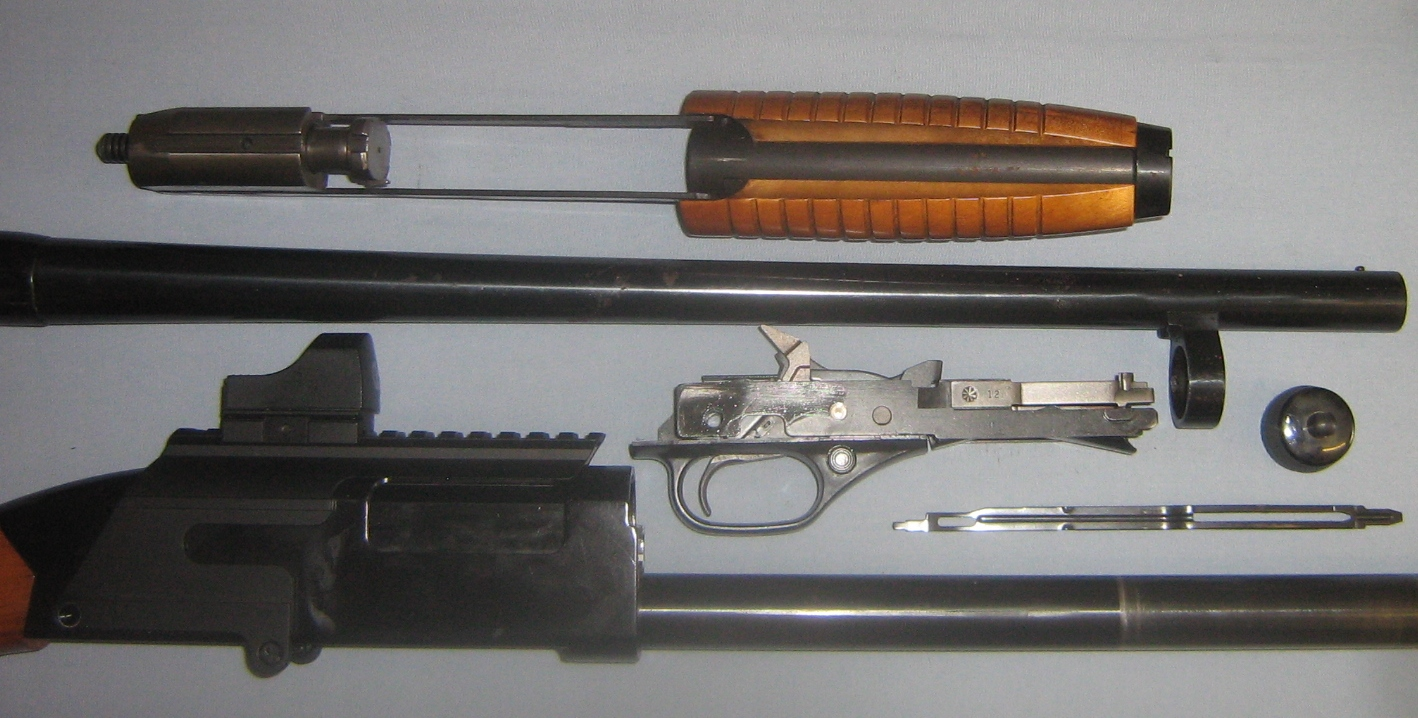
A Model 1300 with 20-inch (510 mm) barrel basic stripped. This example is fitted with an aftermarket picatinny rail. The metal strip immediately above the magazine tube is the ejector spring.

The Winchester Model 1200 pump action shotgun employs a rotating bolt in a bolt carrier (slide) rather than the tilting breechblock used in the Model 12. The Model 1200 was the second shotgun design to utilize a rotating bolt; the Armalite AR-17 being the first. The bolt locks directly into the barrel and has four locking lugs. The receiver is made from aluminium. The bolt carrier is connected to the fore-end (pump handle) by two connecting rails rather than the single connecting rail of the Model 12. The Model 1200 is also hammerless, in that it has an internal hammer. It has a trigger disconnector and lock-out bar safety located to the top front of the trigger guard (depressed from the right to left to fire).

The Model 1200 has a conventional under-barrel tubular magazine, loaded by pushing the trapdoor elevator (forward of the trigger guard) inward as rounds are fed in. The magazine tube also serves as a guide for the pump handle and to secure the barrel. A ring under the barrel fits over the magazine tube and the threaded magazine cap is tightened to hold the barrel against the face of the receiver. (Note: The magazine cap is equipped with a shakeproof device to prevent it loosening during firing.) The takedown design facilitates transport of long barreled versions. (Note: Winchester shipped the Model 1200 with the barrel separate.)

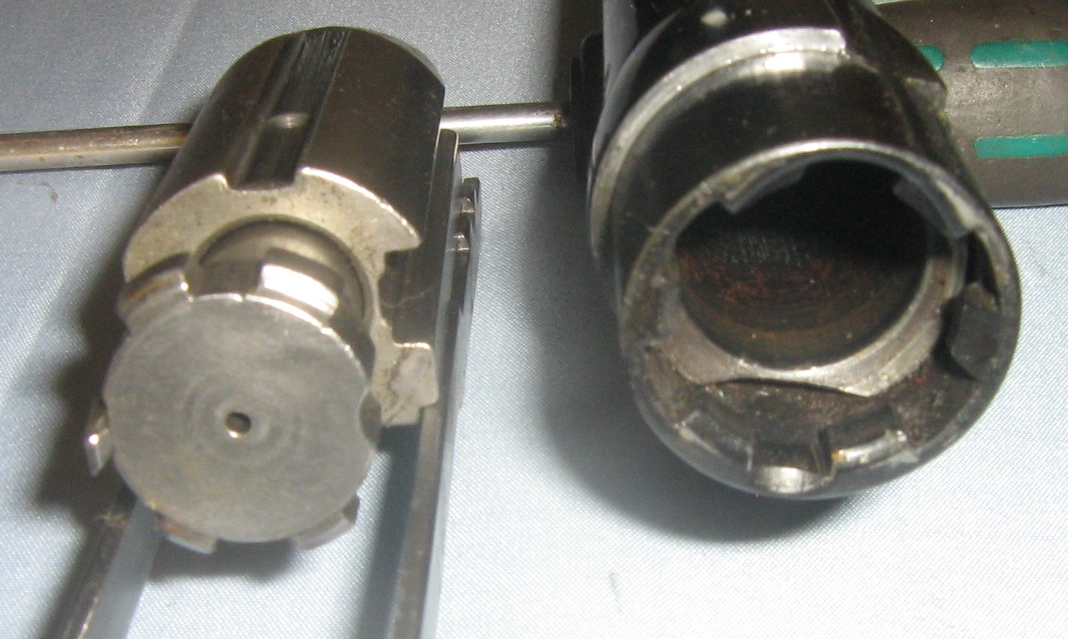
Rotating bolt and barrel breech face

To operate, a cartridge from the loaded magazine is chambered by cycling the action (pumping rearward then forward). As the bolt, moving forward, contacts the breech face, a linear cam and cam pin in the bolt carrier causes the bolt to rotate as the bolt carrier continues to move forward. Completing the full pump stroke locks the bolt. A slide lock prevents the bolt carrier (and pump handle) from moving until either the trigger is pulled or an unlocking button (located to the left rear of the trigger guard) is depressed. Upon firing, the action can be cycled again to reload. The Model 1200 is equipped with a trigger disconnector. If the trigger is not released before cycling the action to reload, it will not fire until the trigger has been released and depressed again. It will not slamfire like the Model 12 and other earlier designs.

=== Configurations ===
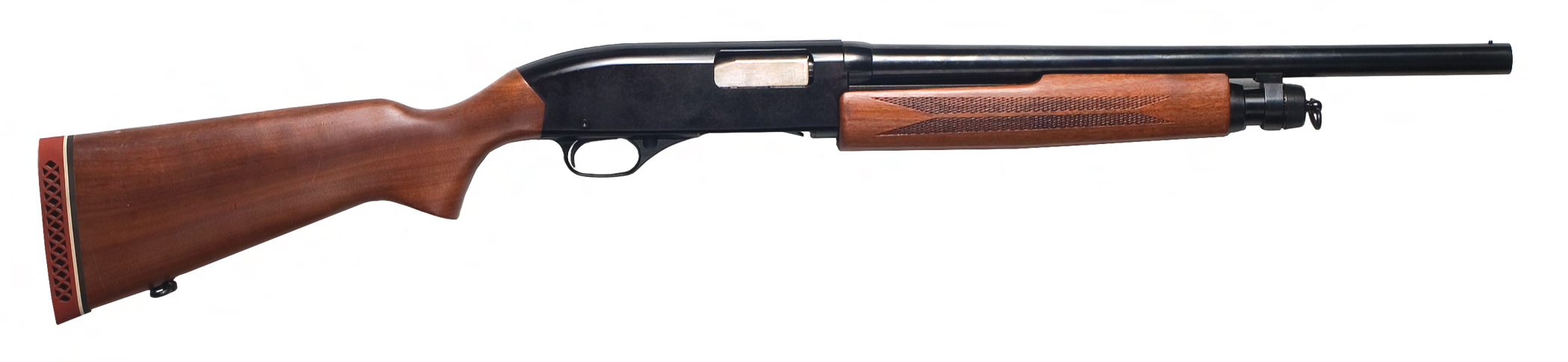
Full wood fore-end

The Winchester Model 1200 was initially produced with barrel lengths of 30 inches (760 mm) or 28 inches (710 mm) chambered for 2.75-inch (70 mm) cartridges in either 12, 16, or 20-gauge. The magazine, with a capacity of four rounds was provided with a wooden insert to limit magazine capacity to two rounds in the magazine. (Note: This was to comply with U.S. laws for hunting migratory birds.) From 1966, it was offered with the option of the Winchester Recoil Reduction System, a telescopic butt recoil shock absorber to reduce the apparent recoil force. (Note: Offerings of the recoil reduction system were last listed in 1970.) This coincided with the option of barrels chambered for 3 inches (76 mm). In 1971, it was offered with the option of the Winchoke screw in choke tube system, supplied with a set of three tubes in improved cylinder (IC), modified (M) and full (F) choke. (Note: Winchokes were ultimately offered in at least six constrictions plus cylinder bore (CB) with a rifled option. (Note: See: "Model 1300 Slug Hunter Sabot (Smoothbore)")) In 1973, 16-gauge was dropped from the production line. With introduction of the Model 1300, a 3-inch (76 mm) chamber was made standard.

The Winchester Defender was offered with an extended magazine capable of holding seven 2.75-inch (70 mm) shells. The magazine tube reached the full length of its 18-inch (460 mm) barrel, which was chambered for 3-inch (76 mm) shells. It was fitted with the corn-cob style fore-end with concentric grooves. Even though the Model 1300 was introduced in 1978, the security series (similar short-barreled offerings), including the Defender, continued to be marketed as a Model 1200 until 1989, after which, it was advertised as a Model 1300. The security series had options for: rifle sights or bead, a rifled bore and pistol grip rather than a butt. A riot version was made, with a stainless steel barrel while a marine version also had chrome plating on other parts.

Winchester offered several combination gun lines. This took advantage of the take-down feature of the design and the interchangeability of barrels within a gauge. (Note: Interchangeability also depends on the length of the magazine tube and position of the barrel ring - ie barrel rings are fixed to a barrel in production to suit a particular magazine tube length.) A single receiver was offered with two barrels: a longer barrel fitted with Winchokes suited for fowling and a shorter barrel, usually with rifle sights, suited for game hunting.

The Ranger series were offerings aimed at the youth and women's market with a shorter length of pull (length of butt). The Model 120 and Model 2200 were economy versions of the gun. The latter was produced for the Canadian market. The Ted Williams Model 200 was a rebadged version of the gun produced for Sears.

The gun has been provided with many options and various grades of finish. These have been combined by Winchester to offer numerous product lines, particularly for the Model 1300. Various options are as follows:

Barrels: Barrels have ultimately been offered in lengths from 18 inches (460 mm) to 30 inches (760 mm) in 2-inch (50 mm) increments. Barrels have been chambered for 12, 16, or 20-gauge with either a 2.75-inch (70 mm) or 3-inch (76 mm) chamber. They have been offered with fixed choke (IC, M, F, Skeet and CB) or with Winchoke attachments. They have been manufactured from either steel or stainless steel and smooth-bored or rifled, with or without vent ribs.

Magazine tube: Generally four or seven 2.75-inch (70 mm) shells. Other tubular magazine lengths have been reported.

Sights: Single front bead, two bead (front and rear), fibre optic sights, rifle sights (adjustable) and fitted for scope (with mounts provided).

Metal finish: Blued, camouflage pattern or chrome plated. Rolled receiver engraving on high-end lines.

Furniture Butt: different butt profiles, standard or shorter length of pull, Winchester Recoil Reduction System, pistol grip butt and pistol grip only. Fore-end: full or corn-cob.

Furniture material: Timber (walnut and other species on economy lines), laminated, composite or synthetic. Timber finish, full colour or camouflage pattern.

== Military use ==
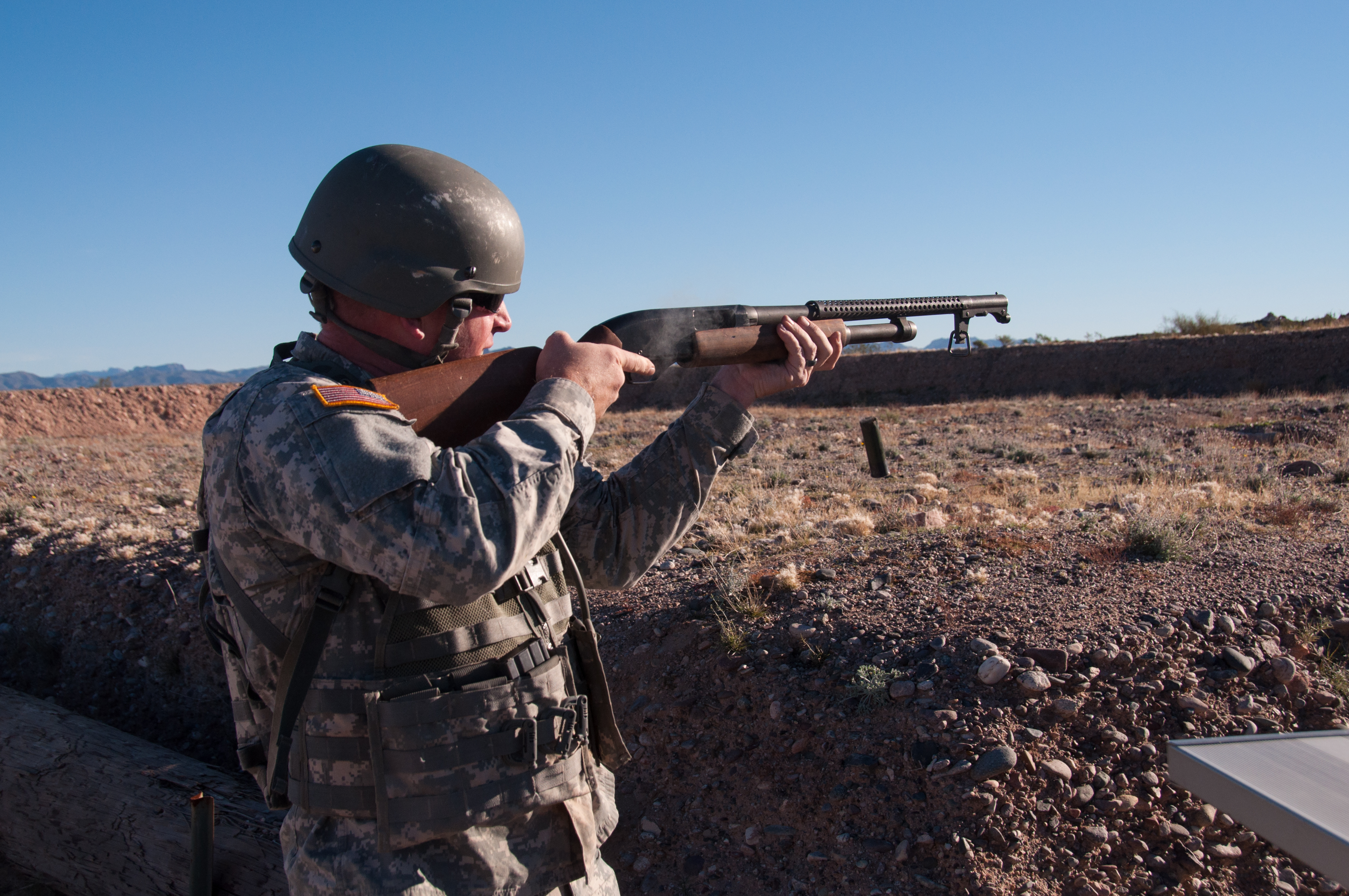
An Arizona National Guard firing a Model 1200, 2015

A small number of the Model 1200 were acquired by the United States Army in 1968 and 1969. This militarized Model 1200 was fitted with a perforated handguard (bayonet band) over the 20-inch (510 mm) 12-gauge barrel chambered for 2.75-inch (70 mm) shot shells. The bayonet band incorporated a bayonet mount and front sling swivel. A rear sling swivel was affixed to the underside of the wooden buttstock. The fore-end was also timber. The bayonet mount accepted the M1917 bayonet. (Note: For images, see Rock Island Auction Company, Lot 345: Vietnam Era U.S. Winchester 1200 Trench Shotgun with Accessories, Auctioned 26 August 2022. Access date 5 May 2023. Archived 5 May 2023.)

In 1979, Mossberg was awarded a contract to supply its Model 500 shotguns to the U.S. Army and the militarized 590 model has subsequently been introduce to all services. However, the Model 1200 remained in service and were used by National Guard units deployed to Iraq in 2003. The Model 1200 was also used during the invasion of Grenada, the invasion of Panama, the U.S. intervention in the civil war in Somalia, Operation Desert Storm and the War in Afghanistan. During the latter conflicts, some were retrofitted with folding stocks, making them more compatible with urban warfare.

In 1999, the semiautomatic Benelli M4 was accepted as the primary U.S. service shotgun.

=== Other users ===
The Model 1200 or Model 1300 has also been acquired by other countries for use by their militaries or security forces.

- Canada: Winchester 1200, Folding Stock Model with Sling Swivels and Wood Stock Model, 457mm Barrel
- Chile: Winchester 1200, US Origin. Foreign Military Sales 200 M1200s in 1971
- Czech Republic: The Model 1300 Defender is used in small numbers by the Czech Armed Forces.
- Dominican Republic Winchester 1200, US Origin. Military Assistance Program 120 in 1966, 67 in 1969, and 37 in 1970.
- Honduras: Winchester 1200, US Origin. Foreign Military Sales, 3 in 1980.
- Indonesia: US Origin, Military Assistance Program 45 before 1974 for Police Riot use.
- Latvia: Used by Latvian Land Forces. It is going to replaced.
- Liberia: Winchester 1200, US Origin. Small numbers.
- Panama: US Origin
- Peru: Special Forces Brigade.
- Philippines US Foreign Military Sales 263 before 1975
- South Korea US Military Assistance Program 1,390 shotguns 1964–74
- Thailand: US Military Assistance program 28 M1200s by 1975.
- United Kingdom: US Foreign Military Sales 200 M1200s acquired in 1971 for use on Gibraltar.
- United States: Military and Police use.
- Uruguay: US Military Assistance Program before 1974, 12 units.

=== Non-state users ===
- Lebanese Forces

== See also ==
- FN TPS
