= Daniel Myron LeFever =

American gun maker

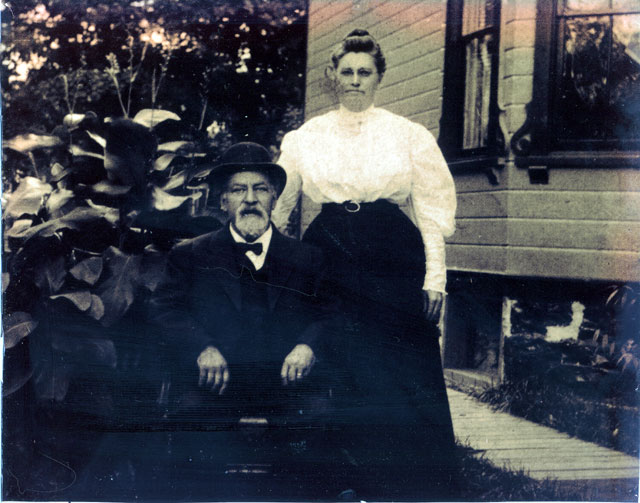
- Lefever and wife, Sarah
- Born: August 27, 1835; Hopewell, New York, US
- Died: October 29, 1906 (aged 71); Syracuse, New York, US
- Occupation: Gunsmith
- Spouse: Sarah Lefever (née Stead)

Daniel Myron Lefever (August 27, 1835 – October 29, 1906) was an American gun maker, popularly known as "Uncle Dan Lefever". He is best known as the inventor of the hammerless shotgun, first introduced in 1878. He was buried at Woodlawn Cemetery.

== Biography ==
Born in Hopewell, New York, Uncle Dan Lefever's gunmaking career began as an apprentice in Canandaigua, New York in the early 1850s. He married Sarah Stead on June 10, 1857, in Canandaigua. He opened his own gunshop in Canandaigua in 1857. His principal business was making muzzle-loading rifles. In 1862 he joined with James Ellis to form Lefever & Ellis. They built long-range rifles which were used in the American Civil War. This partnership broke up in 1867.

=== Gun factory ===
Sometime before 1870 D. M. Lefever moved to Auburn, New York where he joined with Francis Dangerfield to form Dangerfield & Lefever. This firm made primarily breechloading double shotguns. They also converted muzzle-loading guns to breech-loading. This firm dissolved in late 1873 or early 1874.

In early 1874 D. M. Lefever moved to Syracuse, New York. Here he joined with Lorenzo Barber to form Barber & Lefever. Again they made breech-loading shotguns and rifles. This partnership lasted a short two years.

D. M. Lefever then joined with John Nichols and formed Nichols & Lefever. During this time D. M. Lefever worked on the development of the hammerless shotgun. These guns were cocked with a cocking lever on the side of the breech. In 1878 he won first prize at the St. Louis Bench Show and Sportsman's Association for the best breech-loading shotgun in America.

=== Automatic hammerless shotgun ===
By the time D. M. Lefever patented his hammerless shotgun in 1880 he had left Nichols & Lefever and gone into business for himself. In 1883 D. M. Lefever patented the first truly automatic hammerless shotgun. This internalized the cocking mechanism so that the gun was automatically cocked when the breech was closed. He also patented the automatic ejector system which ejected the used shells when the breech was opened. In 1886 D. M. Lefever lost control of his company which by then was called Lefever Arms Company. However, he remained as superintendent until 1902.

In 1902 D. M. Lefever left Lefever Arms Company to form D. M. Lefever, Sons & Company with sons Charles F. Lefever (also known as Fred who later invented the Model 25 Daisy BB pump gun), Frank, and George. They continued to make fine hammerless shotguns, but could not compete with the larger Lefever Arms Company. In 1904 they moved to Ohio, first in Defiance and within a year in Bowling Green. In 1906 they returned to Syracuse, New York, however, before being able to re-establish a viable company D. M. Lefever died on October 29 in Syracuse of a stomach ulcer. His remains are interred, with his wife (who died in 1898), in Woodlawn Cemetery in Syracuse.

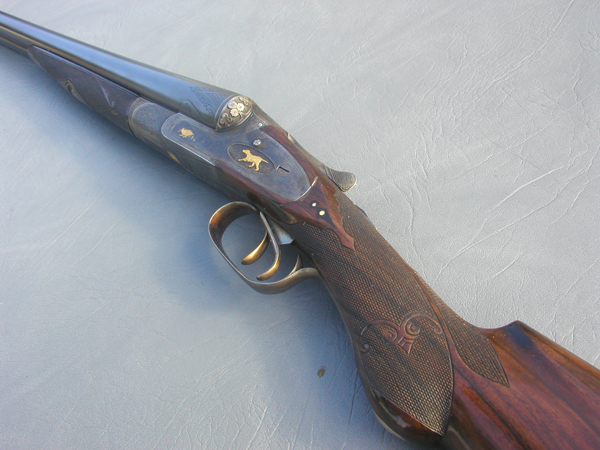
LeFever Arms Co. Optimus Grade shotgun

The Lefever Arms Company continued to make fine Lefever designed shotguns in Syracuse until 1916 when they were purchased by the Ithaca Gun Company. Ithaca continued to produce Lefever-designed guns under the Lefever Arms Company name in Ithaca, New York until 1921. These were made using primarily left-over parts from the Syracuse operation. Shortly after that the Ithaca Gun Company used the Lefever name to market an inexpensive gun, the "Lefever Nitro Special", that was of their own design, having nothing to do with D. M. Lefever except to exploit his name. These were manufactured until the early 1940s.

== Uncle Dan LeFever Cup ==
The Lefever Arms Collectors Association created the "Uncle Dan Lefever Cup" in honor of the legacy of D.M. Lefever. The "Uncle Dan LeFever Cup" shoot-off is held annually during a LACA designated trap shoot event. The highest scoring shooter wins a trophy engraved with the year the champion won. Only LACA members, firing Lefever guns, are eligible for the award. The first "Uncle Dan Lefever Cup" was awarded during the Greater Northeast Side by Side in Friendsville, PA, on June 6, 2010. LACA held the 2nd Annual shoot-off during the June 2011 Nimrod Classic in Bozeman, MT. The 3rd Annual Uncle Dan Cup was held again at the Greater Northeast Side by Side in Friendsville, PA, on June 2, 2012. The 4th Annual Uncle Dan Cup will be held at the Spring 2013 Southern Side By Side in Sanford, NC. April 26–27, 2013.
