= Remington Model 31 =

- Type: Shotgun
- Place of origin: United States

Service history
- Wars: World War II

Production history
- Designer: C.C. Loomis; John Pedersen
- Designed: 1931
- Manufacturer: Remington Arms
- Produced: 1931–1949
- No. built: 196,000
- Variants: Model 31L

Specifications
- Cartridge: 12-gauge, 16-gauge, 20-gauge
- Barrels: Plain, solid rib, or vent rib
- Action: Pump-action
- Feed system: Tubular magazine
- Sights: Bead

The Remington Model 31 is a pump-action shotgun that competed with the Winchester Model 1912 for the American sporting arms market. Produced from 1931 to 1949, it superseded the John Pedersen-designed Models 10 and 29, and the John Browning-designed Model 17. It was replaced by the less expensive to manufacture Model 870 in 1950.

== History ==
While the Remington Model 17 enjoyed some success, a solid, 12-gauge featuring side-ejection was needed to compete with Winchester. C.C. Loomis sized up the Model 17 and adapted it for side ejection. The Model 31 was Remington's first side ejecting pump-action shotgun. Stocks were walnut with checkered walnut forend and later changed to a ribbed forend. The Model 31 was made in three gauges, with 121,000 12-gauge models made and 75,000 16- and 20-gauge examples also produced. The Federal Bureau of Investigation acquired one Model 31 per office in 1935 in response to the Kansas City Massacre. The model 31L was a lightweight version featuring an aluminum receiver and trigger housing.

During World War II Remington produced a Model 31 riot gun for military use. These were stamped "U.S. Property" on the left side of the receiver and had an approximate serial number range of 51000–63000. Except for a single prototype, no Model 31 trench guns were produced.

Despite being well received, sales still lagged far behind the Winchester. Remington went back to the drawing board and designed the Model 870; this shotgun matched the durability of the Model 12 at a significantly lower cost. Despite the overwhelming success of the 870, many shotgun connoisseurs consider the Model 31 to be the ne plus ultra of pump shotguns with its "ball-bearing" slide action.

The Model 31 was later used as a basis for the Mossberg 500 and related shotguns. The Mossberg is simplified and cheaper to produce. Notable differences are the use of a two-piece bolt with separate locking piece as well as a significantly simplified barrel mounting system. Further, the bolt locks into a barrel extension rather than directly to the receiver.
