= Hammerless =

Firearm design lacking an external hammer

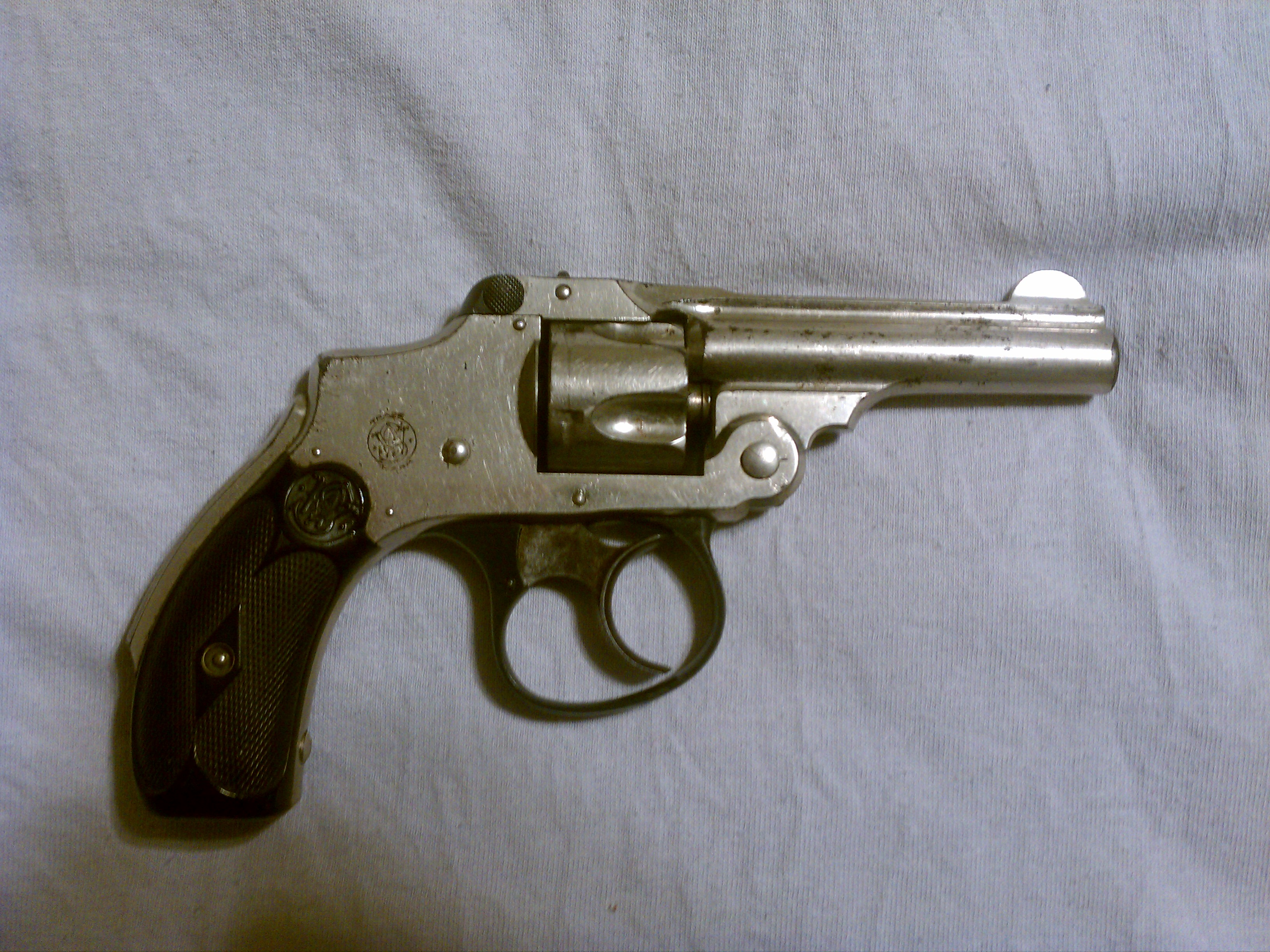
Example of a hammerless revolver, the Smith & Wesson Safety Hammerless

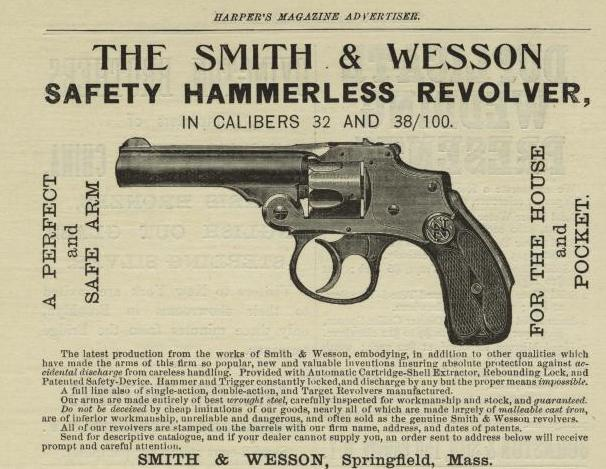
Smith & Wesson Safety Hammerless advertisement from 1899, as published in Harper's Magazine

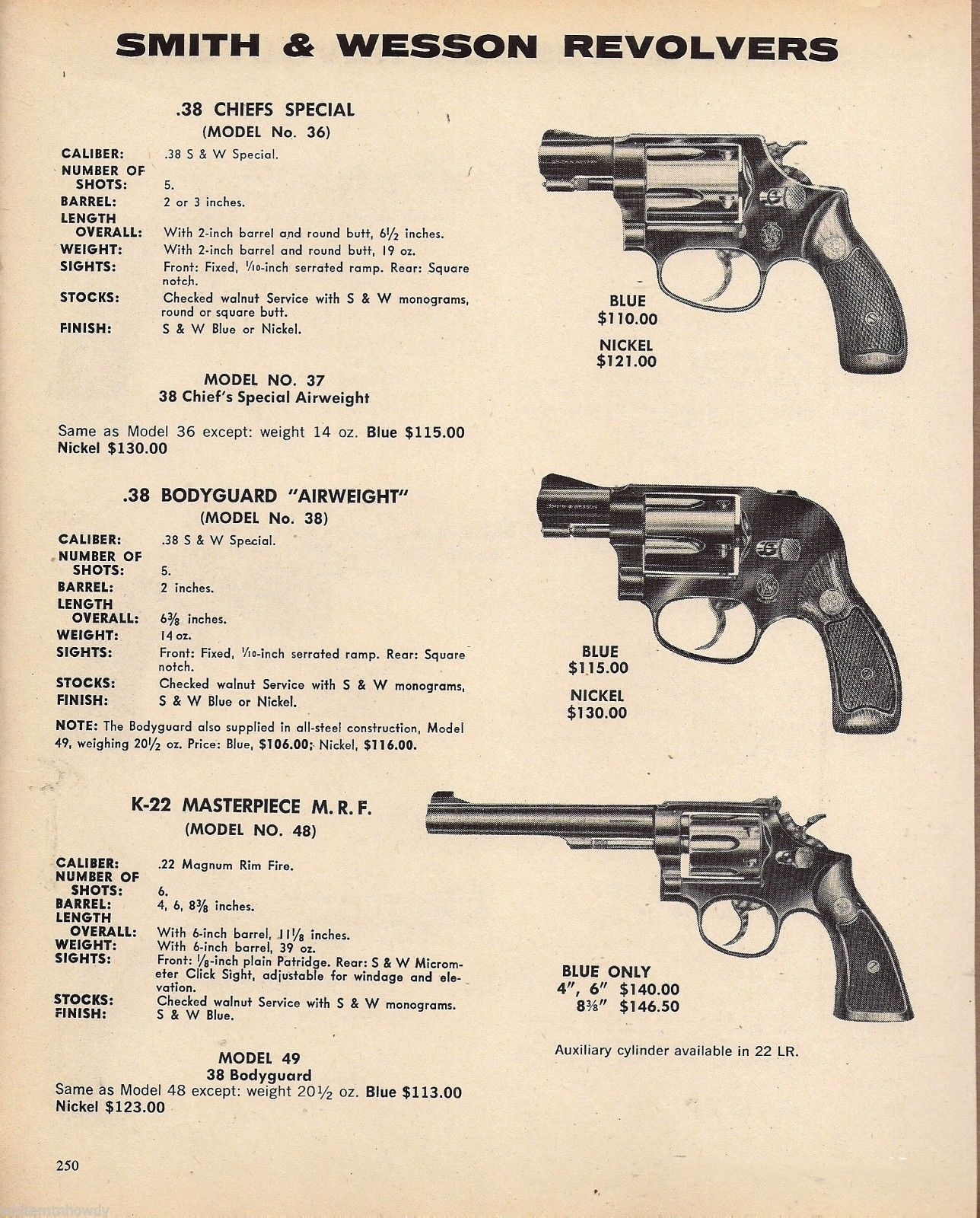
A page of the 1976 Smith & Wesson catalog, detailing the Models 36, 37, 38, 48, and 49. A hammerless Smith & Wesson revolver is located in the middle

A hammerless firearm is a firearm that lacks an exposed hammer or hammer spur. Although it may not literally lack a hammer, it lacks an external hammer that the user can manipulate directly. One of the disadvantages of an exposed hammer spur is the tendency for it to get caught on items such as clothing; covering (shrouding or bobbing) the hammer by removing the hammer spur reduces this from occurring.

== Early hammerless firearms ==
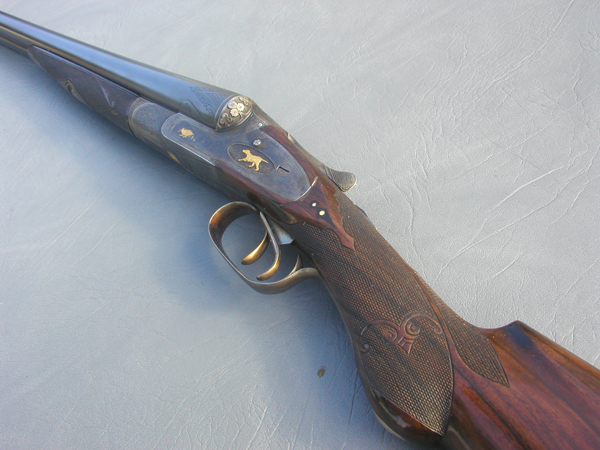
Lefever Arms Company hammerless shotgun

Early caplock firearms, patterned after their flintlock ancestors, had exposed hammers. The conversion was done by replacing the flash pan with a nipple for a percussion cap, and the flintlock's cock with a hammer to crush the metallic cap and ignite the powder. The hammer was on the side of the firearm, which is easily reached for priming and cocking.

The earliest cartridge firearms simply copied the older style of action; the Springfield Model 1873 "Trapdoor" rifle and most early cartridge double-barreled shotguns and double-barreled rifles are good examples of this. In these designs, the loading of the cartridge(s) and the cocking of the hammer(s) were separate operations. While rifles evolved quickly away from these early breech loading designs, the double-barrelled shotgun and the double rifle retained its popularity, and for some time, its exposed hammers.

First produced by British gunmaker George Daw 1862, but his model was not a success. However it inspired other models by a number of makers using trigger-plate designs by Green (1868), Murcott (1871) Gibbs and Pitt (1873), and F.B. Woodward in (1876). The first American inventor was Daniel Myron LeFever in 1878. It used internal strikers that were cocked manually, but in 1883, he developed a version that cocked the strikers automatically as the action was closed. This type of hammerless action, or the similar cock-on-open variation, is nearly universal in the majority of modern American double-barrel shotguns.

== Hammerless technology ==
A hammerless weapon is a modification of the original firing mechanism of firearms. Hammerless firearms do not feature an exposed firing hammer or firing “spur”. This feature is easily identifiable in the rear of the weapon's stock and requires the operator to manually “cock” it to arm the weapon. Rifles with an exposed firing hammer were frequently subjected to accidental discharges due to the exposed firing pin. With a hammerless weapon an internal firing pin reduced the risk of accidental discharge to the operator, because of the safety features of the internal firing pin. The rifle and shotgun subsequently became capable of having a more rapid firing rate as well, because the operator no longer had to manually “cock” the exposed firing hammer(s) on the weapon prior to each time the weapon was discharged. The exposed firing hammer was also frequently caught on clothing and interfered with the operator's ability to aim accurately. The introduction of hammerless firearm technology in rifles and shotgun and later on, handguns greatly improved their safety, firing rate, and accuracy.

The Savage Arms Company pioneered the use of hammerless technology in repeating rifles during the late nineteenth century, and this feature has carried on to the majority of firearms today. Compared to pistols and handguns of the nineteenth century, which had exposed firing hammers, weapons such as the Glock series have enclosed firing mechanisms that do not use an actual hammer. The firing pin is put under spring tension during cocking and the trigger simply releases the pin. Hammerless technology has increased the safety of firearms by reducing the risk of injury to the operator and by increasing the technological capabilities of a firearm's mechanical features.

== Hammerless firearms ==
=== Shotguns ===
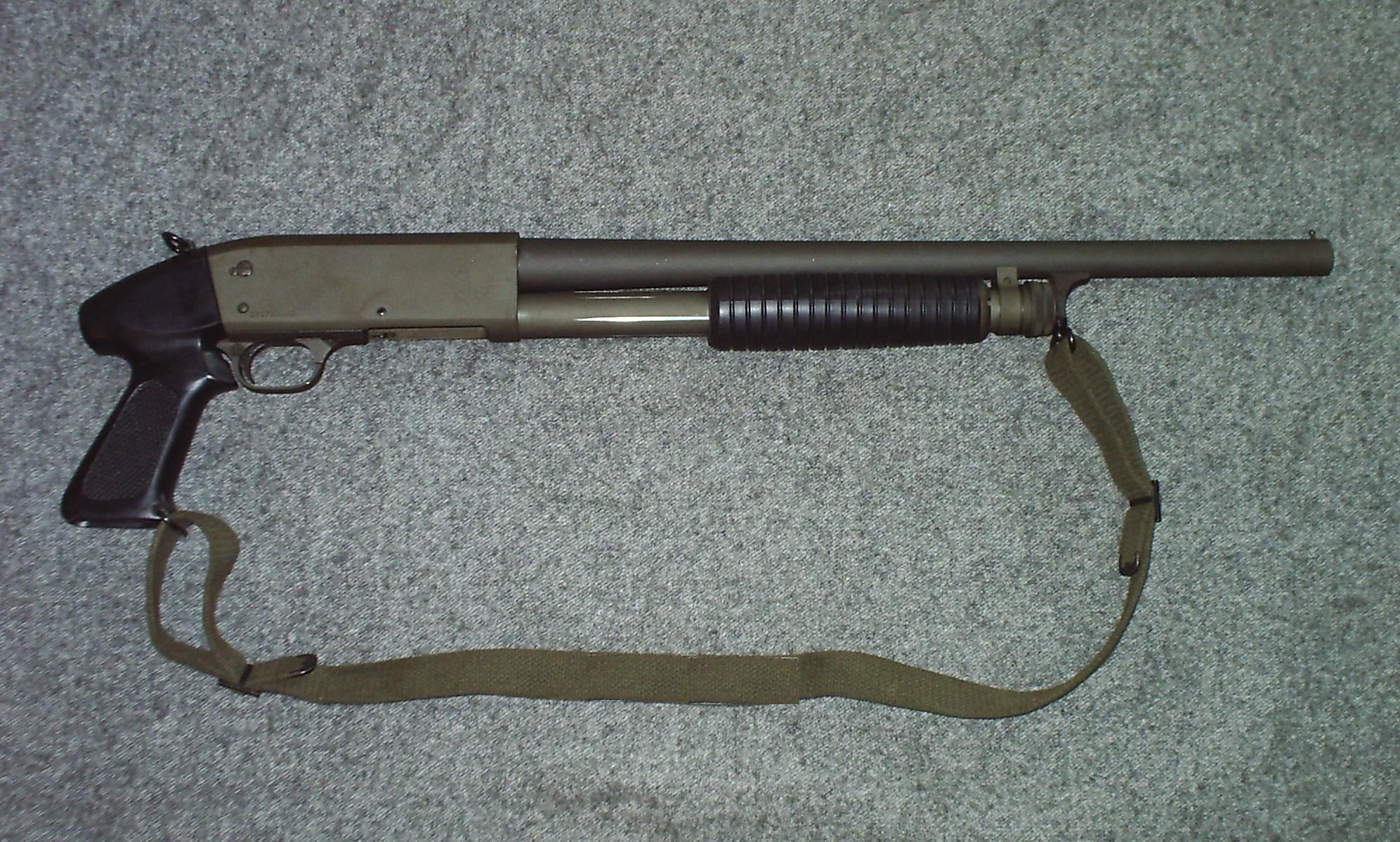
Ithaca 37 shotgun

Early pump-action shotguns, like the lever-action rifles that preceded them, had exposed hammers. The most famous of these is probably the Winchester Model 1897. Like the double-barrelled shotguns, soon, the early pump-action shotguns were replaced by models that enclosed the hammer completely in the action. Modern pump-action shotguns, with the exception of replicas of older exposed-hammer designs required in Cowboy action shooting, are all hammerless.

=== Handguns ===
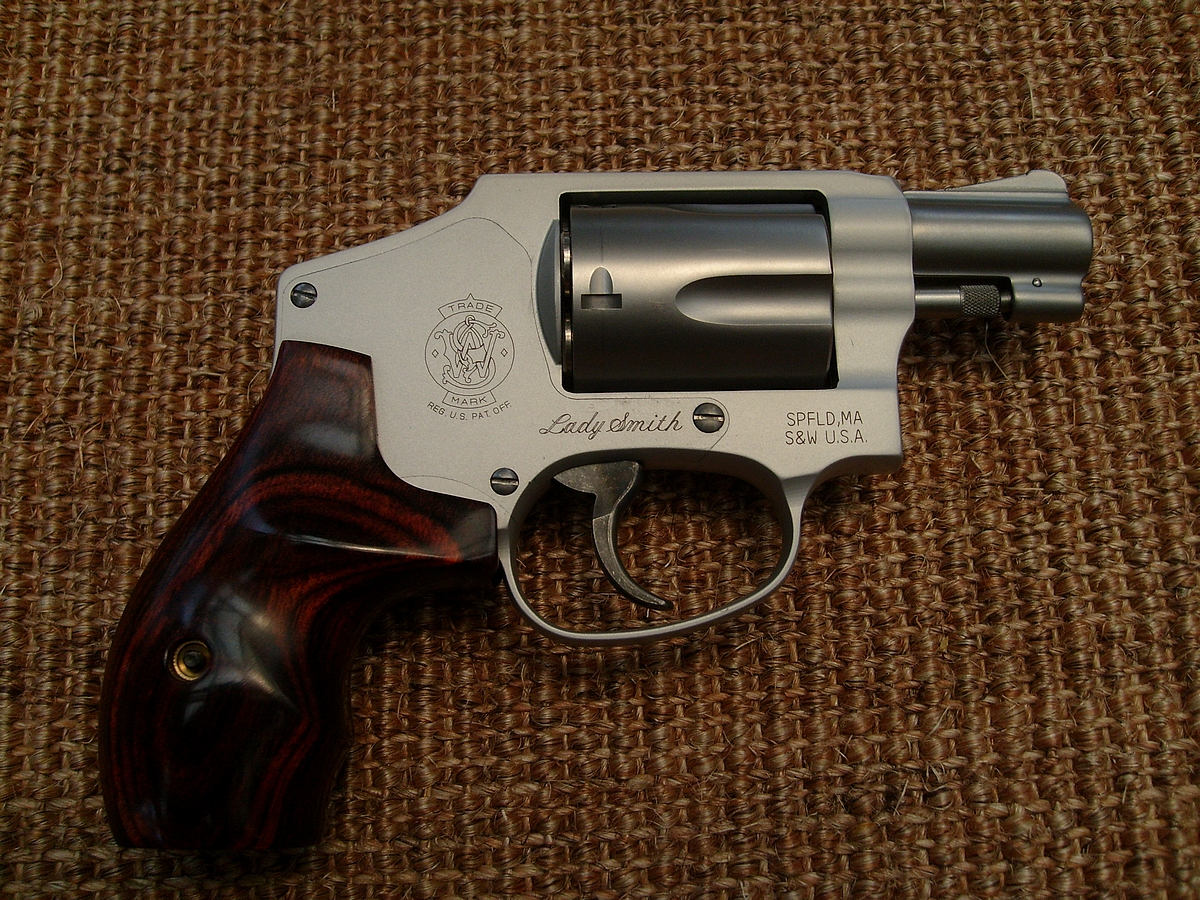
Smith & Wesson Model 642 Ladysmith in .38 Special

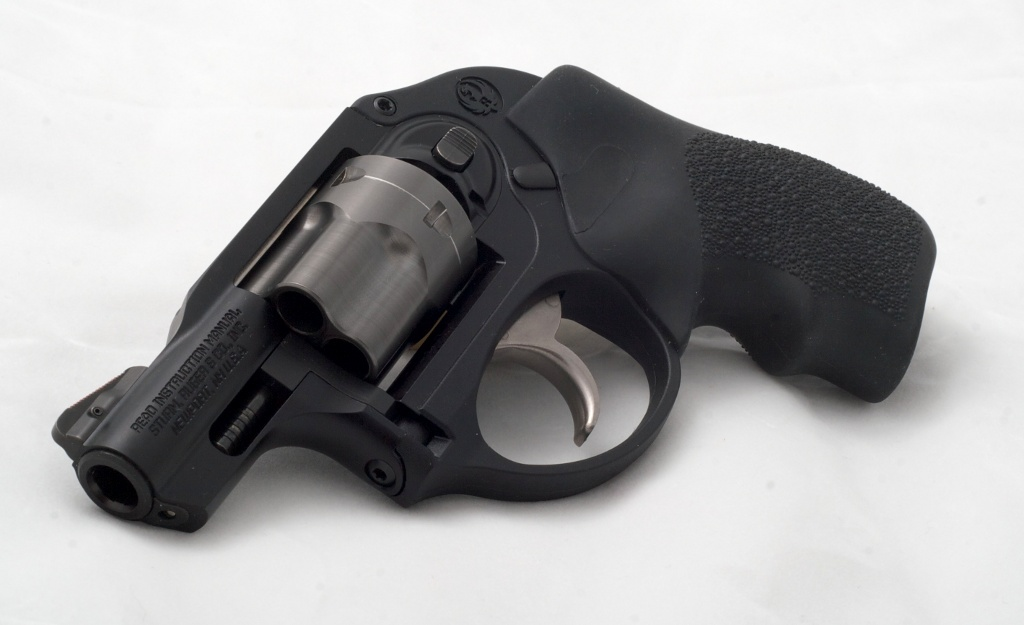
A contemporary hammerless revolver, the Ruger LCR

While shotguns have gone almost entirely hammerless (inexpensive single-shot models being the main exception), handguns are available in significant numbers in many different forms, with or without exposed hammers. Striker-fired guns, which are becoming more common, have no hammer, but they have a striker that is used as a firing pin instead, while many guns that do have hammers, such as revolvers, they are available with the hammer shrouded or with the hammer spur bobbed off. To be able to shroud or bob the hammer of a revolver or semi-automatic pistol, it must be of either a double-action or double-action only design.

=== Rifles ===
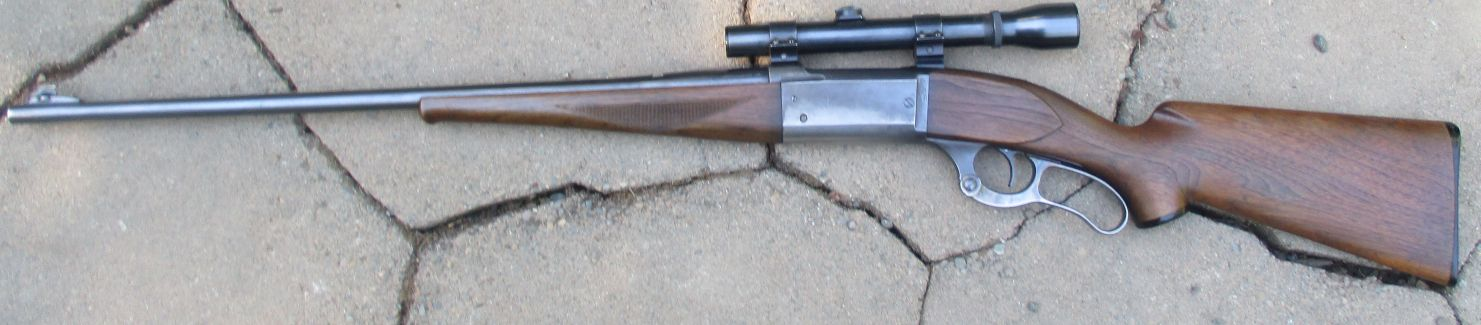
Savage Model 99 hammerless rifle, with scope

The hammerless repeating rifle is a firearm that operates without any external hammer or firing pin. Hammerless firearms do not use a firing pin. This device was first introduced in 1879 with the Climax Safety Hammerless Gun, which was developed in order to prevent accidents from occurring while firing a weapon with a worn hammer/ firing pin. The hammerless rifle was further developed, and Arthur William Savage of the Savage Arms Company introduced a more perfected model in 1895. This rifle may be referred to as a six-shooter repeating rifle due to its capability to carry five rounds within the internal magazine as well as one round in the rifle's chamber. This modification to firearms reduces risk of injury to the operator because of the enclosed firing pin. Older versions of the rifle had external hammers, which did not always remain cocked until the trigger was pulled. The Hammerless Rifle encloses this firing mechanism utilizes a “locking bar”, which secures not only the triggers, but also secures the “firing blocks” while the barrel is opened to discharge shells.

Prior to this hammerless technology, rifles were fixed with an exposed firing hammer and, at times, would be dangerous to the operator. Rifles without this hammerless technology could be cocked and accidentally discharge while the breech was opened. The fear from gun owners of these accidental discharges were well deserved, and even applied to the earliest models of hammerless weapons. Hammerless weapons were initially accepted with some hesitation because the hammerless guns were manufactured with a locking bar, which secures the trigger only and not the firing hammer. Hammerless weapons, such as the Climax Safety Hammerless Gun, was manufactured with a locking mechanism that locked the trigger and featured a strong block that would move in front of the weapon's firing hammer while being reloaded. The hammerless repeating rifle produced by Savage Arms in 1895 was coined the “Model 1895 Rifle” and drastically improved the standard lever-action rifle of the time period. This weapon was similar to the Climax Hammerless Gun in design but was manufactured in mass quantities for commercialization. The Savage Model 99 and the Winchester Model 88/Sako VL63 Finnwolf are probably the most well-known examples of this type of firearm.

== See also ==
- Glossary of firearms terms
