= Remington Model 17 =

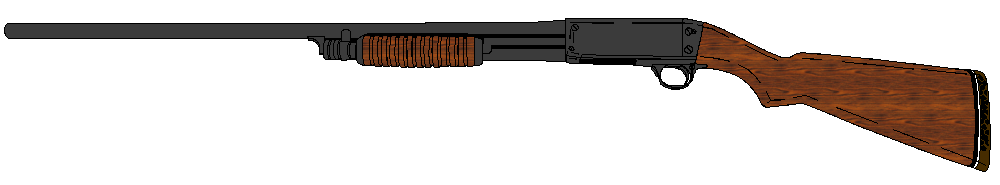
- Illustration of a Remington Model 17
- Type: Shotgun
- Place of origin: United States

Production history
- Designer: John Browning; John Pedersen
- Designed: 1913
- Manufacturer: Remington Arms
- Produced: 1921–1941
- No. built: 72,644

Specifications
- Mass: 5.75 lb (2.6 kg)
- Barrel length: 26 in (660 mm) to 30 in (760 mm)
- Cartridge: 20 gauge
- Action: Pump-action
- Feed system: 5-round tubular magazine
- Sights: Bead

In 1915 John Browning patented a pump-action shotgun with the following features: hammerless, under-loading, tubular-magazine, bottom-ejecting, and take-down. This design would eventually become the Remington Model 17. Manufacturing rights were sold to Remington Arms shortly after, but due to the production efforts of World War I, Remington was unable to begin manufacturing until 1921. Before production began John Pedersen made alterations to the design, with more changes made later by G. H. Garrison. The Model 17 was a trim, 20-gauge shotgun that served as the design basis for three highly successful shotguns: the Remington Model 31, the Ithaca 37 and the Browning BPS. Additionally, features of the Model 17 were also incorporated in the later Mossberg 500 and Remington 870.

== Remington Model 17R ==
The Remington Model 17R (R for "Riot") was produced with a 20 inch barrel. It did not sell well however a cut-down version featuring a 15.1 inch barrel and a pistol grip gained popularity with Detectives, marketed as the "Model 17R Special Police". Major purchases of this shotgun were made by the New York Police Department and the St. Louis Metropolitan Police Department. The shotgun was referred to as a "Whippit Gun" due to its ease of use to "whip it out and fire". Variants can be found with the short barrel and fixed stock as opposed to pistol grip depending on officer preference. The shotgun is considered a predecessor of the modern full stocked 14-inch combat shotguns favored by law enforcement.

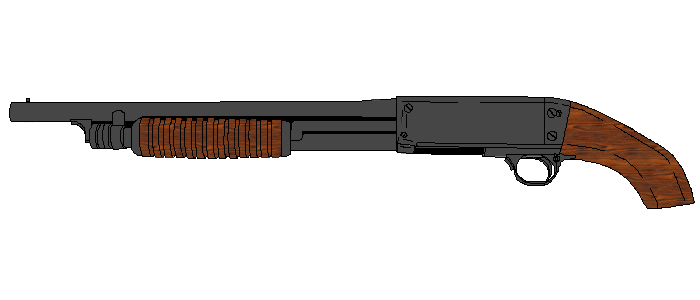
Illustration of the Remington Model 17 Special Police Gun

== Users ==
- United States
  - New York Police Department
  - St. Louis Metropolitan Police Department
