= Smith & Wesson Model 1940 Light Rifle =

Model 1940 Light Rifle
- Type: Semi-automatic carbine
- Place of origin: United States

Production history
- Designer: Edward S. Pomeroy
- Manufacturer: Smith & Wesson

Specifications
- Mass: 9 pounds (4 kg)
- Length: 32 inches (81 cm)
- Barrel length: 9.75 inches (25 cm)
- Cartridge: 9×19mm Parabellum
- Caliber: 9mm
- Action: Blowback, Open Bolt
- Feed system: 20-round box magazine

The Model 1940 Light Rifle was a military semi-automatic carbine designed for Great Britain in preparation for World War II. The design was not considered suitable for full-scale production. Most trials rifles sent to Great Britain were destroyed at the end of World War II.

== Description ==
The Model 1940 Light Rifle was assembled from a Tenite buttstock and milled steel parts with blued finish. The short barrel was fluted with twelve longitudinal indentations. A forward grip extending downward from the receiver served as a downward ejection port for spent cartridges and housed a detachable magazine with capacity for 20 cartridges. Although the ejection port design avoided flinging spent cartridges about, it proved difficult to clear when jammed cartridges caused malfunctions. Use of machined parts made the weapon heavy and expensive to manufacture.

== History ==
In early 1939 the British government asked Smith & Wesson to design a light rifle firing the 9×19mm Parabellum cartridge for military use. The British government advanced one million dollars toward production of the design following receipt of prototypes assembled in accordance with a patent application filed on 28 June 1939. Testing at the Royal Small Arms Factory revealed the rifle had been designed for cartridges as loaded by United States civilian cartridge companies, and the higher pressure United Kingdom military loads caused broken receivers after as few as 1,000 rounds. The British government required redesign so rifles would withstand firing 5,000 rounds without failure. The receiver was strengthened with an external sleeve to meet that requirement. Rifles with the strengthened receiver were designated Mark II and rifles with original receivers were subsequently referred to as Mark I. The British government cancelled the production contract after receiving 60 prototypes and 950 rifles. Approximately 750 were Mark I rifles, and about 200 were the stronger Mark II design. The rifles were not issued to the armed forces; and most were cut in half and dumped at sea when the second world war ended. Five were saved for display in museums including the Tower of London.

Smith & Wesson continued production with serial numbers as high as 2200 and the rifle was tested by the United States Army at Aberdeen Proving Ground. The Army rejected the design because the rifle was chambered for what was then a non-standard cartridge for the United States military. There was some discussion about redesign to permit full-automatic fire; but production was halted after a total of 1,227 rifles had been manufactured. The short-barreled weapons were considered unsuitable for sale to civilians under the National Firearms Act, so an inventory of 217 remained at the Smith & Wesson factory until a dealer negotiated Curio and Relic Firearms status with the Bureau of Alcohol, Tobacco, Firearms and Explosives in 1975. Firearms collectors subsequently purchased 137 Mark I and 80 Mark II rifles.
