= Ithaca Gun Company =

American manufacturer of shotguns and rifles

- Type: Private
- Industry: Firearms
- Predecessor: W.H. Baker Company
- Founded: Ithaca, New York, U.S. (1880; 146 years ago)
- Founder: Leroy Smith and William Henry Baker
- Headquarters: Upper Sandusky, Ohio, U.S.
- Area served: Global
- Key people: David Dlubak
- Products: Shotguns and Rifles
- Parent: Ithaca Acquisition, Inc
- Website: www.ithacagun.com

The Ithaca Gun Company is an American manufacturer of shotguns and rifles originally established in Ithaca, New York, in 1880.

== History ==
Over the years, Ithaca made numerous firearms, most notably the Ithaca Flues double-barreled shotgun and the Ithaca 37 shotgun.

=== Production ===
Ithaca became famous for building firearms based on expired patents owned by Remington Arms. They also purchased patents from other firearm designers. In 1895 Emil Flues was granted Patent # 546,516, for a double-barreled shotgun with only three moving parts per barrel. Ithaca bought the patent in 1907 and upgraded the design to allow for mass production. With the Flues-designed Ithaca double, which became the best-selling American double of all time with more than 223,000 produced between 1908 and 1926, Ithaca effectively drove Remington out of the double gun market.

Ithaca also produced the M1911 pistol during World War II and the M3 Grease Gun during the Korean War, both for the United States military. Its Model 37 12-gauge shotguns were the standard used by the Los Angeles Police Department and New York Police Department, and sold to the Royal Thai Army in the early 1980s to arm farmers against communist insurgents. Its hunting shotguns were known for their fine decorative work, typically waterfowl or hunting dogs. In 1989, Remington purchased a design from Ithaca, the Mag-10 shotgun, which they produced as the SP-10.

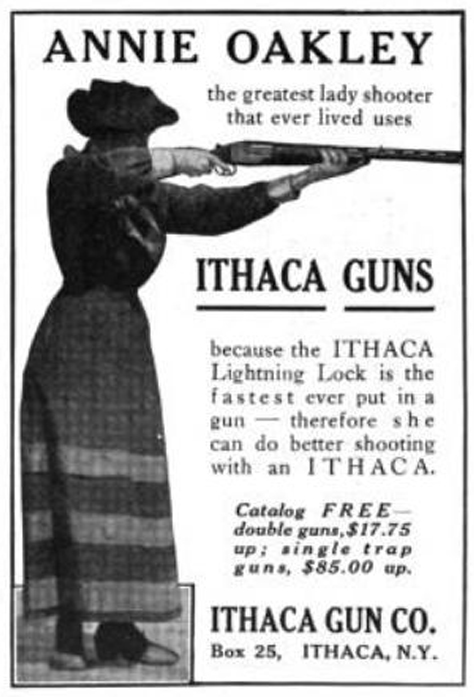
Ithaca Gun Co. - Annie Oakley gun, 1916

Around 1877, brothers Lyman Cornelius and Leroy Smith went into business with William Henry Baker. They moved the W.H. Baker Company, which manufactured double- and triple-barreled shotguns, from Center Lisle, New York to Syracuse. In 1883, Baker and Leroy Smith left the company, moved to Ithaca, and established the original Ithaca Gun Company with several partners. The company was responsible for much of the early industry of Tompkins County, especially during World War I and World War II, and counted among its patrons John Philip Sousa, Annie Oakley, and Alfred Lee Loomis At the time Sousa was president of the American Trap Shooters Association and The Ithaca gun company named a shotgun in his honor, the Sousa Grade. Annie Oakley used an Ithaca Flues model in her competition and exhibition shooting. In 1917, Alfred Loomis and his brother-in-law, purchased 17,000 acres (69 km2) of Hilton Head Island, which they established as a private hunting preserve and purchased Ithaca shotguns for use by guests. Dwight D. Eisenhower and George C. Marshall also owned Ithaca double barrel shotguns.

=== Lefever guns ===
The Lefever Arms Company (1883–1916) was a manufacturer of guns in Syracuse, New York, founded by Daniel Myron LeFever (1835–1906), an American gun maker popularly known as "Uncle Dan LeFever". He is best known as the inventor of the hammerless shotgun, first introduced in 1878. The company was in the business of gun manufacture until 1916, when it was incorporated into Ithaca Gun Company in Ithaca, New York which continued with the LeFever gun production until 1921. Although production of the LeFever Sidelock Model designed by Dan LeFever ended, the Ithaca gun company continued to use the LeFever name on Boxlock action double and single-barrel guns until 1941.

=== Fall creek ===
The original factory was located in the Fall Creek neighborhood of the city, on a slope later known as Gun Hill, where the nearby waterfall supplied the main source of energy for the plant. In later years, the company came under criticism regarding environmental pollution of Fall Creek, especially by lead, which led to a Superfund remediation effort. Various plans to demolish the derelict plant and to redevelop the land failed over the years due to the cost of remediation and community objection to construction proposals. The factory which had sat vacant for two decades was condemned in March, 2006 and demolished, only the smokestack remains. An apartment project has been proposed for the site. Despite having moved 6000 tons of lead-contaminated material between 2002 and 2004, at a cost of $4.8 million, it was necessary to perform more clean up at the superfund site in 2015.

=== Reorganization ===
The company was controlled by the Smith family until 1967, when it was sold to a Colorado company, Jerry Baldritch & Asso., which later, after buying 10X Clothing, Atlantic Dinghy, and American Fiberglass, became General Recreation, Inc., and in 1971(approx.) made a public stock offering on the NYSE. General Recreation encountered financial problems in the late 1970s, selling off all its subsidiaries except Ithaca Gun. After a failed attempt to move manufacturing to Colorado, it filed for Chapter 11 reorganization in December, 1978, shuttering the plant on December 20 for several months. General Recreation filed for bankruptcy a second time in September, 1985.

In 1987, new owners Ithaca Acquisition, Inc., moved manufacturing to King Ferry, New York. In 2005, it received a $150,000 development loan from Cayuga County, and in May of that year moved to larger facilities in Auburn. After being unable to facilitate an operational manufacturing facility in Auburn, the owners sold all of Ithaca's assets, trademarks, and manufacturing rights to the Marshalls from Upper Sandusky, Ohio. The physical goods were relocated to Floyd Marshall's 30+ year-old tool and die shop where all prints, programs, and processing were converted to CNC machine tools. Unable to secure state or local financing assistance with the startup conversion, the Marshalls were forced to sell the company. Dave Dlubak purchased the company in June, 2007, and it continues to operate in Upper Sandusky, Ohio.
