= FN TPS =

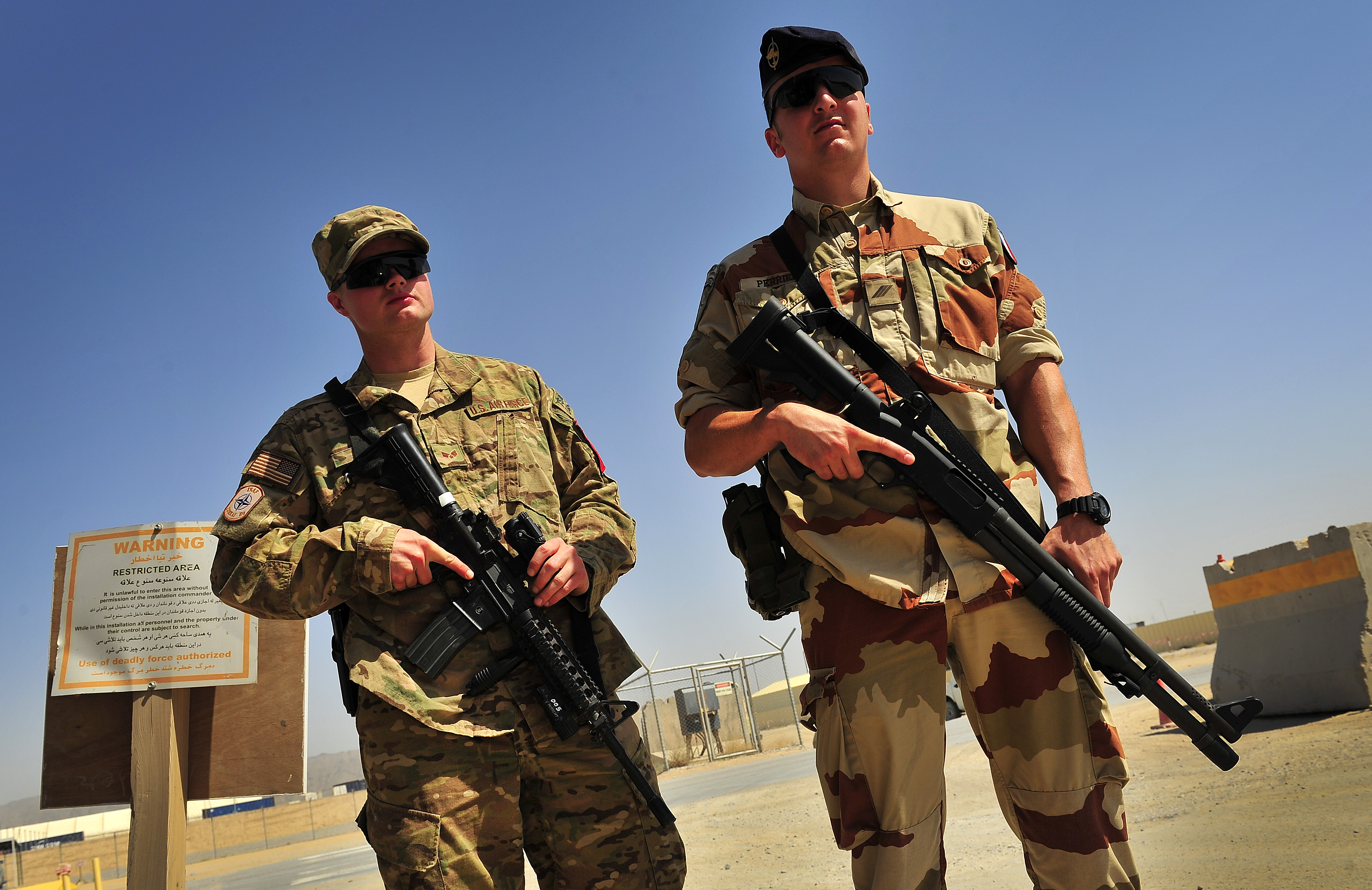
- A French Fusilier Commando de l'Air (right) carrying the FN TPS shotgun
- Type: Shotgun
- Place of origin: Belgium

Service history
- In service: 2000?

Production history
- Manufacturer: FN Herstal
- Produced: 2003–2012
- Variants: TPS Collapsible stock; TPS Fixed stock

Specifications
- Mass: 6 lb (2.7 kg) (Collapsible); 6.5 lb (2.9 kg) (Fixed)
- Length: 35 in (89 cm) (Collapsible); 39.75 in (101.0 cm) (Fixed)
- Barrel length: 18 in (46 cm) (Collapsible); 18 in (46 cm) (Fixed)
- Cartridge: 12-gauge (2.75" and 3")
- Action: Pump-action
- Feed system: Internal tube magazine, 7+1
- Sights: M16A2 style front & rear

The FN TPS (Tactical Police Shotgun) is a pump-action shotgun designed and manufactured by FN Herstal.

== Design ==
The TPS is based on the Winchester Model 1300 and uses many similar features such as the ported barrel.

The TPS also has many modern features, including an adjustable or A2 fixed stock, pistol grip, adjustable sights, and MIL-STD-1913 Picatinny rail.

The TPS features an M16A2-style front and rear adjustable sight.

== Users ==
- France
