= Lefever Arms Company =

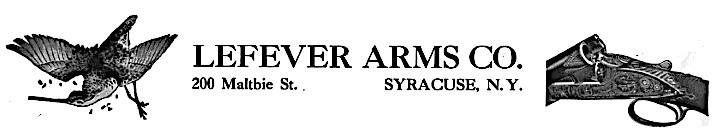
- Type: Gun Manufacturing, later ventured into transmissions and jackshafts
- Industry: Gun industry, automotive industry
- Genre: Guns, transmissions
- Founded: 1883
- Founder: Daniel Lefever
- Fate: Gun business merged into Ithaca Gun Company in 1916; Transmission business merged into Durston Gear Company in 1916
- Headquarters: Syracuse, New York, United States
- Area served: United States
- Products: Guns, automotive parts

The Lefever Arms Company (1883–1916) was a manufacturer of guns in Syracuse, New York founded by Daniel Lefever. The company was in the business of gun manufacture until 1916, when it merged with Ithaca Gun Company in Ithaca, New York, which continued Lefever production until 1921.

By 1912, the company ventured into the manufacture of transmissions and jackshafts for motor wagons. This subsidiary was merged with the Durston Gear Company in 1916.

== Advertisements ==
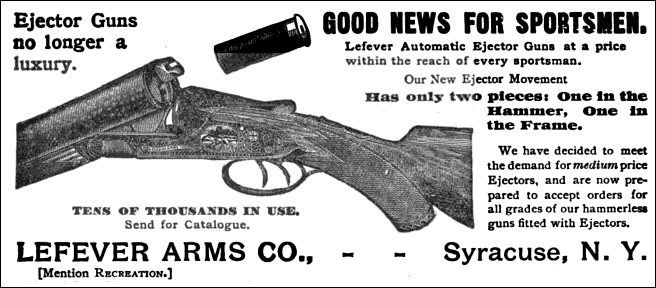
Lefever Arms Company - Advertisement "Ejector Gun" - 1896

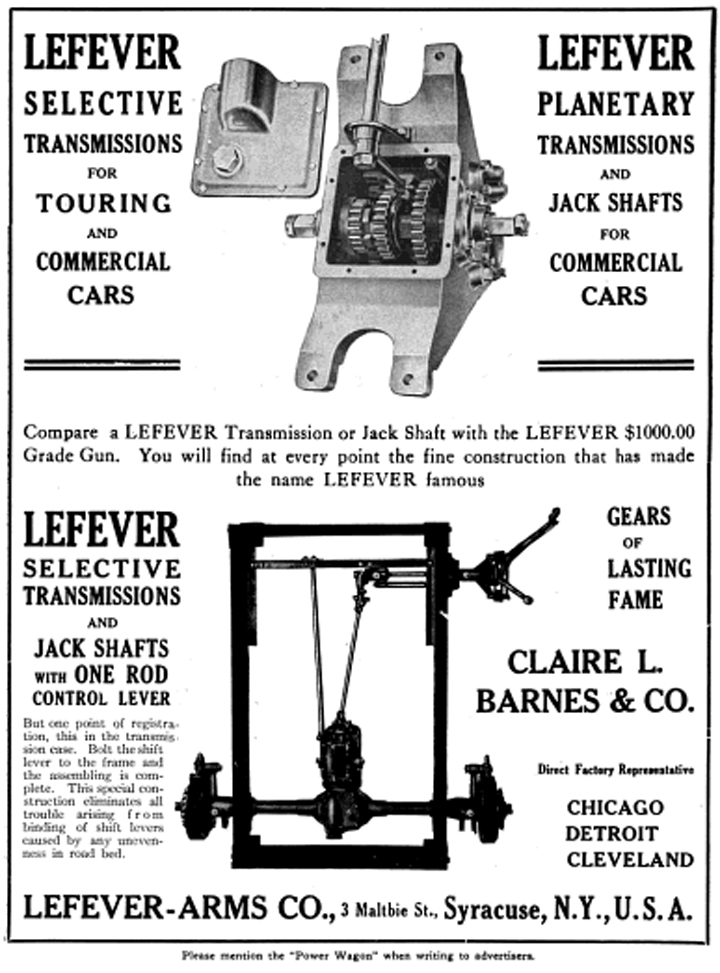
Lefever Arms Company - Advertisement, Power Trucks - 1912

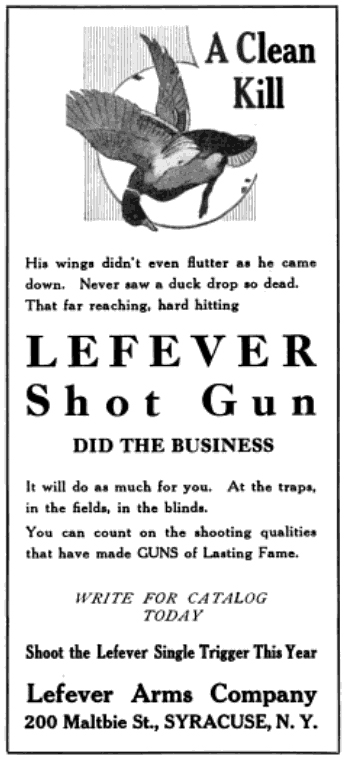
Lefever Arms Company - Advertisement, Shotgun - 1914

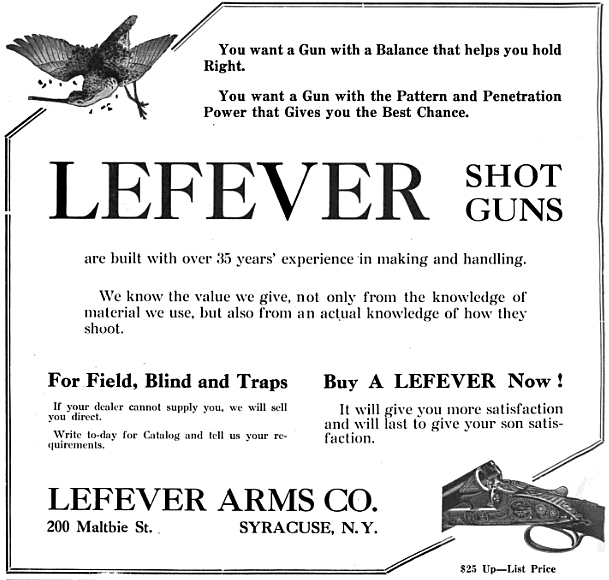
Lefever Arms Company - Advertisement, Lefever Guns - December, 1916

== See also ==
- Union Automatic Revolver
