= Friendsville, Pennsylvania =

Borough in Pennsylvania, US

- Borough
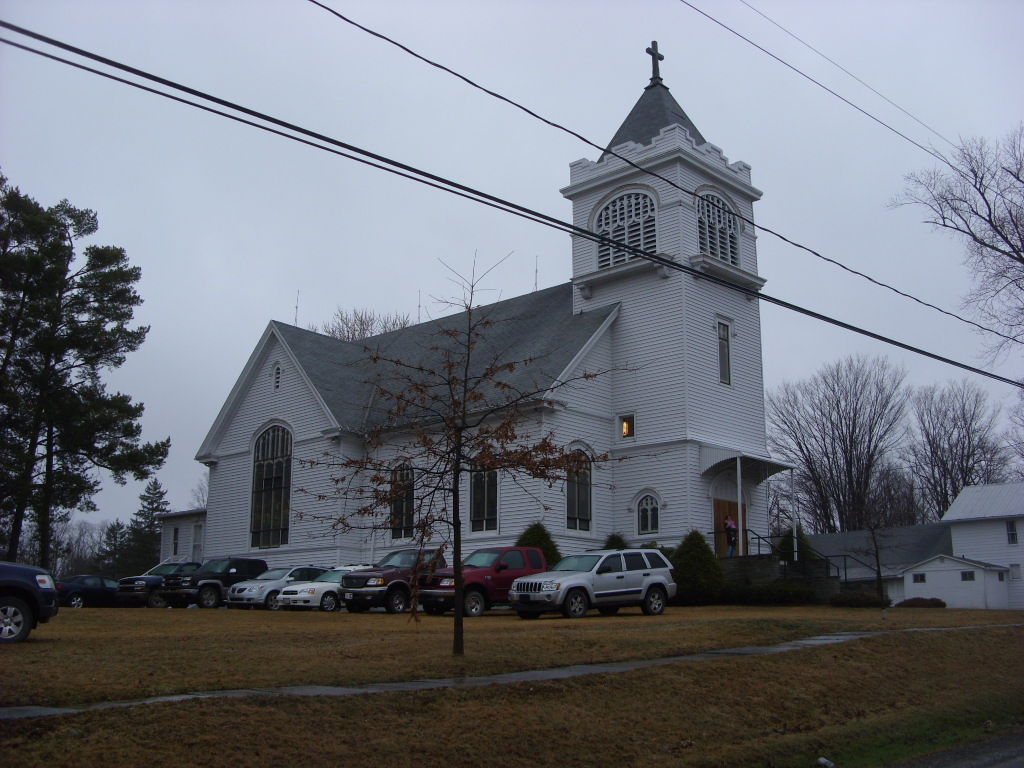
- St. Francis Xavier Church

- Location of Friendsville in Susquehanna County, Pennsylvania.

- Location within Pennsylvania Location within the United States
- Coordinates: 41°55′05″N 76°02′49″W
- Country: United States
- State: Pennsylvania
- County: Susquehanna
- Settled: 1819
- Incorporated: 1847

Area
  - Total: 1.49 sq mi (3.87 km^{2})
  - Land: 1.49 sq mi (3.87 km^{2})
  - Water: 0 sq mi (0.00 km^{2})

Population (2020)
  - Total: 101
  - Density: 67.6/sq mi (26.09/km^{2})
- Time zone: UTC-5 (Eastern (EST))
  - Summer (DST): UTC-4 (EDT)
- Zip code: 18818
- Area code: 570
- FIPS code: 42-27968

Friendsville is a borough in Susquehanna County, Pennsylvania, United States. The population was 100 at the 2020 census.

== History ==
Friendsville was founded in 1819, and named for the fact a large share of the first settlers were Quakers.

== Geography ==
Friendsville is located at 41°55′5″N 76°2′49″W (41.917987, -76.046952).

According to the United States Census Bureau, the borough has a total area of 1.5 square miles (3.9 km^{2}), all land.

== Demographics ==
Historical population
Census	Pop.	Note	%±
1850	185		—
1860	202		9.2%
1870	223		10.4%
1880	176		−21.1%
1890	139		−21.0%
1900	110		−20.9%
1910	103		−6.4%
1920	74		−28.2%
1930	74		0.0%
1940	76		2.7%
1950	65		−14.5%
1960	60		−7.7%
1970	77		28.3%
1980	72		−6.5%
1990	102		41.7%
2000	91		−10.8%
2010	111		22.0%
2020	101		−9.0%
2021 (est.)	100	▼	−1.0%

=== 2010 census ===
At the 2010 census there were 111 people, 44 households, and 29 families living in the borough. The population density was 74 people per square mile (29 people/km^{2}). There were 54 housing units at an average density of 36 per square mile (14/km^{2}). The racial makeup of the borough was 91.9% White, 6.3% Black, and 1.8% Native American. Of the 44 households 31.8% had children under the age of 18 living with them, 52.3% were married couples living together, 11.4% had a female householder with no husband present, and 34.1% were non-families. 22.7% of households were one person and 11.4% were one person aged 65 or older. The average household size was 2.52 and the average family size was 2.97.

The age distribution was 27.9% under the age of 18, 55% from 18 to 64, and 17.1% 65 or older. The median age was 42.5 years.

The median household income was $35,625 and the median family income was $51,250. Males had a median income of $29,464 versus $37,917 for females. The per capita income for the borough was $15,996. There were 15.6% of families and 9.6% of the population living below the poverty line, including 7.9% of under 18 and none of those over 65.

=== 2000 census ===
At the 2000 census there were 91 people, 38 households, and 25 families living in the borough. The population density was 62.0 people per square mile (23.9 people/km^{2}). There were 45 housing units at an average density of 30.7 per square mile (11.9/km^{2}). The racial makeup of the borough was 100.00% White. Of the 38 households 26.3% had children under the age of 18 living with them, 55.3% were married couples living together, 7.9% had a female householder with no husband present, and 34.2% were non-families. 23.7% of households were one person and 5.3% were one person aged 65 or older. The average household size was 2.39 and the average family size was 2.88.

The age distribution was 23.1% under the age of 18, 6.6% from 18 to 24, 26.4% from 25 to 44, 31.9% from 45 to 64, and 12.1% 65 or older. The median age was 42 years. For every 100 females there were 106.8 males. For every 100 females age 18 and over, there were 94.4 males.

The median household income was $53,125 and the median family income was $53,750. Males had a median income of $31,250 versus $24,375 for females. The per capita income for the borough was $18,502. There were 9.4% of families and 6.8% of the population living below the poverty line, including 9.4% of under eighteens and none of those over 64.
