= Remington Model 10 =

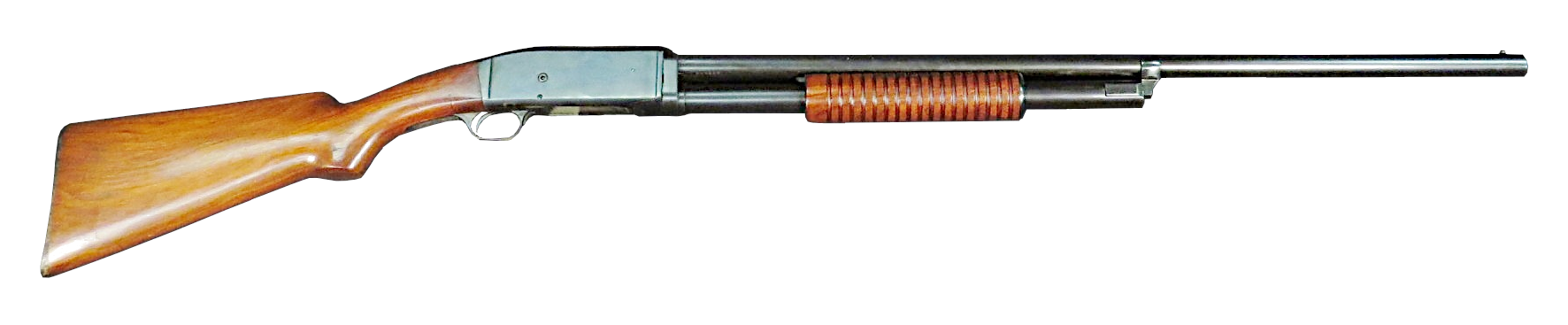
- Type: Shotgun
- Place of origin: United States

Service history
- Used by: United States Army; United States Marine Corps; Viet Cong
- Wars: World War I, World War II, Vietnam War

Production history
- Designer: John Pedersen
- Manufacturer: Remington Arms
- Produced: 1908–1929
- No. built: 275,600 (+38,000 Model 29)
- Variants: Model 10 Trench; Model 10 Target; Model 29 (1930 to 1933)

Specifications
- Mass: 7.75 lb (3.52 kg)
- Length: 48 in (120 cm)
- Barrel length: 30 in (76 cm)
- Caliber: 12-gauge
- Action: Pump-action
- Feed system: 6-round tubular magazine

The Remington Model 10 is a pump-action shotgun designed in 1908 by John Pedersen for Remington Arms. It has an internal striker within the bolt and a tube magazine which loaded and ejected from a port in the bottom of the receiver. An updated version, the Model 29, was introduced in 1930 with improvements made by C.C. Loomis.

== Military use ==
The United States military used a short-barreled version known variously as the "trench" or "riot" shotgun. The Winchester Model 1897 was the major production, but Remington made 3,500 of the Model 10-A version for issue to U.S. troops during World War I. The Model 10 was modified by reducing the barrel length to 23 inches (58 cm) and adding sling swivels, a wooden heat shield over the barrel, and an adapter with bayonet lug for affixing a M1917 bayonet. These trench guns with serial numbers between 128000 and 166000 were stamped with US and the flaming bomb insignia on the left side of the receiver. Remington also developed a "trench gun" variant for the Russian army, which existed in both long-barreled and short-barreled versions, and featured a rifle-style wooden barrel shroud and a mount for a Mosin-Nagant bayonet. But, after fall of the Imperial government, the new government was not interested in such a highly-specialized weapon and the Model 10 was not adopted by the armed forces. The United States military also purchased a number of Remington Model 10 with 20-inch (51-cm) barrels for guarding prisoners and 26 to 30-inch (66 to 76-cm) barrels for training aerial gunners. The Model 10-A was used in limited numbers by the Marine Corps through the 1930s.
