= Bayonet lug =

Feature on long guns

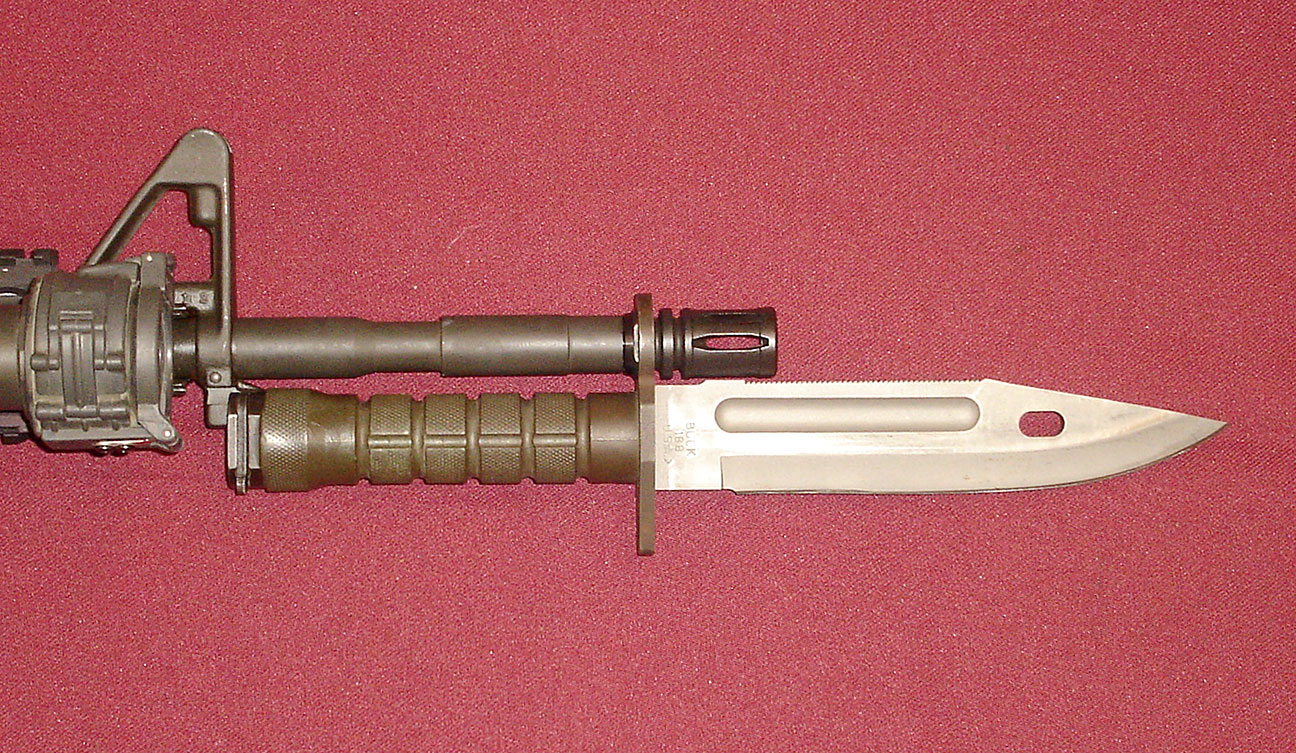
M9 bayonet mounted on an M4

A bayonet lug is a standard feature on most military and on some civilian long guns. It is intended for attaching a bayonet, which is typically a short-bladed multipurpose knife bayonet. The bayonet lug is the metal mount that either locks the bayonet onto the weapon or provides a base for the bayonet to rest against, so that when a bayonet cut or thrust is made, the bayonet does not move or slip backwards.

Prior to the lug's invention, plug bayonets were used, which were shoved into the muzzle end from a tight-fitting stub, preventing the firearm from being reloaded or discharged. By the early 18th century, this type of bayonet was being phased out and subsequently replaced with the socket bayonet. This type of bayonet slides over the muzzle end with the blade offset to the side at a right angle, above or underneath the barrel. The front sight post served as a lug which held the bayonet in place via a revolving socket. The socket bayonet would later be replaced in the late 19th century by the press stud and bayonet lug. Bayonet lugs are usually located near the muzzle end of a long gun barrel. The lug is occasionally placed on top of the barrel, if serving as the base of the front sight, it is more often mounted to the side or bottom of the barrel.

== See also ==
- Glossary of firearms terms
- Bayonet mount, a fastening mechanism
