= Ithaca 37 =

Ithaca Model 37
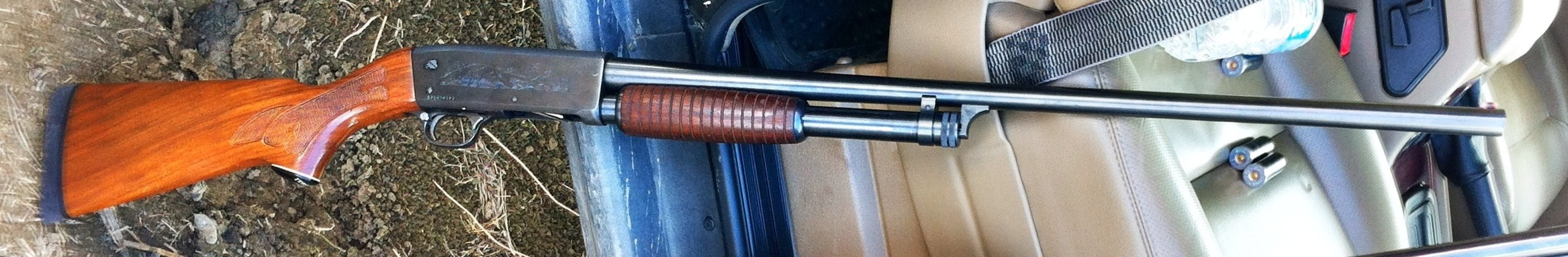
- Ithaca 37 Featherlight
- Type: Shotgun
- Place of origin: United States

Service history
- Used by: See Users
- Wars: World War II; Korean War; Vietnam War; Cambodian Civil War; Rhodesian Bush War; 1989 attack on La Tablada barracks 1992 Los Angeles riots

Production history
- Designer: John Browning, Harry Howland
- Designed: 1933
- Manufacturer: Ithaca Gun Company; Industrias Marcati
- Produced: 1937–present
- Variants: Bataan Modelo 71; Ithaca Model 87

Specifications
- Mass: Varies
- Length: 29.9 to 39.6 inches (760 to 1,010 mm)
- Barrel length: 13 to 30 inches (330 to 760 mm)
- Cartridge: 12, 16, 20, or 28 gauge
- Action: Manually operated, pump-action
- Feed system: 4, 5, or 7-round tubular magazine (riot, standard, and extended tube versions)

The Ithaca 37, also known as the Ithaca Model 37, is a pump-action shotgun made in large numbers for the civilian, law enforcement and military markets. Based on a 1915 patent by firearms designer John Browning for a shotgun, initially marketed as the Remington Model 17, it utilizes a novel combination ejection/loading port on the bottom of the gun which leaves the sides closed to the elements.

== History ==
Following the First World War, the Ithaca Gun Company sought to produce a pump-action shotgun to compete with the ubiquitous Winchester Model 1912. They used the Remington Model 17 as their model and made modifications—such as simplifying and cost-saving alterations of the firing pin and ejection mechanism, the work of Ithaca designer Harry Howland in 1931—while waiting for related patents to expire. After gearing for production of their new shotgun as the Ithaca Model 33 in 1933, Ithaca discovered a Pedersen patent that would not expire until 1937, and production had to be delayed. In 1937, it was released as the Ithaca 37.

With the depression dragging on and another war looming on the horizon, the Ithaca M37 suffered the fate as other sporting arms within that period, ceasing production entirely. While Ithaca did produce some shotguns for military use during the war, they also produced M1911 pistols and M3 submachine guns.

After World War II, Ithaca resumed production of the Model 37. Made in many different models, the Ithaca 37 has the longest production run for a pump-action shotgun in history, surpassing that of the Winchester Model 12, the original inspiration for Ithaca's entry into the market. Ithaca has suffered many setbacks in its history and changed hands numerous times. At one time, the Ithaca 37 was renamed the Model 87, although it was soon changed back in one of many ownership changes. Production paused in 2005 when Ithaca once again changed hands. Production has resumed in Upper Sandusky, Ohio.

The Ithaca 37 is the only pre–World War II shotgun still in production.

== Operation ==
Loading the Ithaca 37 involves inserting shotshells of the proper gauge through the loading/ejection port in the bottom of the receiver and pushing them forward into the magazine until retained by the shell stop. The slide release is pressed and the slide retracted completely then pushed forward. Pulling the trigger fires the gun and releases the slide for reloading. On most models up to 1975, a second sear was installed that would drop the hammer as soon as the gun went into battery if the trigger was in a depressed condition. Thus, holding the trigger down allowed the gun to fire the instant a new round is cycled into the chamber without requiring the trigger to be released; this feature was called "slam-fire". Otherwise, the 37 operates in much the same way as other pump-action shotguns; with the exception that, unlike most pump-action (and semi-automatic) long arms – which usually eject expended shells to one side, usually the right – the 37 ejects them downward, through the aforementioned loading/ejection port. This has made the Ithaca popular with left-handed users, who may fear hot shells being thrown at them by other guns.

== Selected versions ==
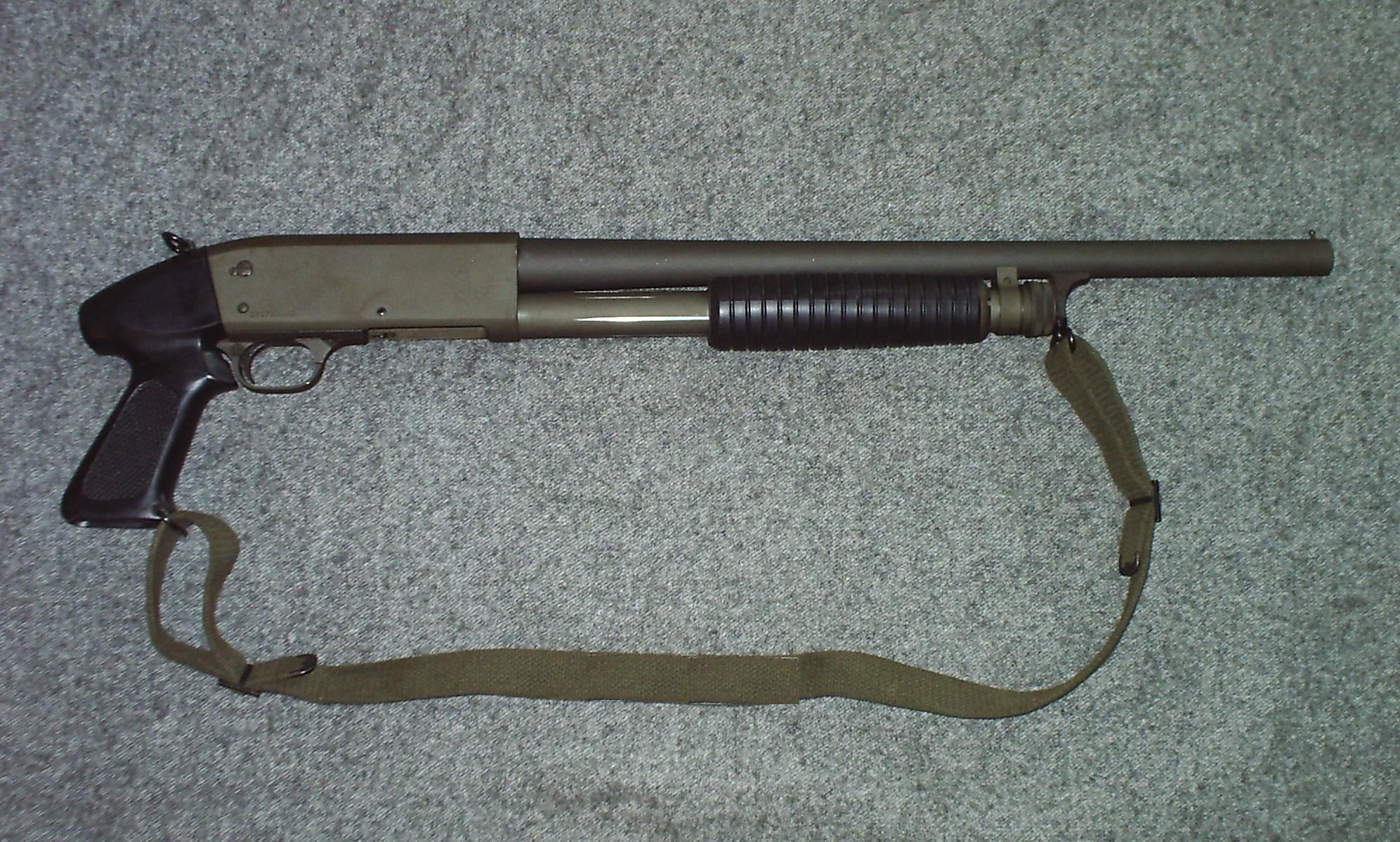
Riot model with black pistol grip and green sling

- S-prefix: were manufactured for a 1962 United States military contract. S-prefixed serial numbers ran from approximately 1,000 to 23,000 with "U.S." on the receiver and "P" proof markings on the barrel and receiver. The guns have a Parkerized finish with a 20-inch (51 cm) barrel and plain stock with plastic butt plate and no sling swivels. A few later contracts produced smaller numbers of guns with sling swivels and serial numbers in the high 900,000 range. Some had "duckbill spreader" shot diverters for use by United States Navy SEALs. Others were fitted with a ventilated handguard and bayonet adapter. New bayonets were manufactured by General Cutlery, Inc. and Canada Arsenal, Ltd.
- Ultralite: an aluminium receiver variation.
- Deerslayer: a version with a shortened barrel and rifle-style sighting system.
- Turkeyslayer: a Synthetic stock (in black and camo pattern) version designed for turkey hunting.
- DSPS: for Deerslayer Police Special. A military and police version.
- Stakeout: short version with a 13-inch (330 mm) barrel and pistol grip stock. Because of its barrel length and overall length, this model is classified under the National Firearms Act as an "any other weapon".
- 28 Gauge: 28 gauge model built on traditional size 28 gauge receiver.
- Defense: an affordable 12 or 20 gauge model built for home defense purposes. 18.5-inch (47 cm) barrel with 5-round capacity or 20-inch (51 cm) barrel with 8-round capacity. Essentially the same as the Model 37 M&P's used by military and police for many years.

== Users ==
The Model 37 was used by the United States Armed Forces in World War II, the Korean War, and especially the Vietnam War, where it gained a great reputation for reliability in the jungles of Vietnam when generally used by special and special operations forces like the Navy SEALs and Army Green Berets. The largest single users outside the US Military were the New York City Police Department and the Los Angeles Police Department. The NYPD used two versions of the Model 37: one with a 13-inch (33 cm) barrel with forend hand-strap for its Emergency Service Unit and one with an 18-inch (46 cm) barrel for its Highway Patrol and solo patrol officers of designated low-crime precincts through a short-lived program spanning from the late 1970s to early 1980s. The Model 37 was issued by the LAPD beginning in the early 1940s and remained in service until the late 1990s. Other users include the Los Angeles County Sheriff's Department and various military, police, and security agencies and prisons around the world. The Ithaca 37 remains a popular choice among civilians for both sport and personal protection. The Model 37 Featherlight has commonly been seen in the hands of farmers and hunters in the midwestern United States.

- Argentina − Unlicensed domestic manufacture under the "Bataan 71" moniker.
- Bolivia − Riot control version. 62 delivered through the Mutual Assistance Program (MAP) in 1965−1966.
- Brazil − 50 delivered through MAP in 1964.
- Chile − 40 delivered through MAP in 1966.
- Iran − 2 riot guns delivered through MAP in 1967.
- South Korea
- Liberia − 10 purchased in 1978 for police use, while the US government previously provided a small number to the Liberians.
- Panama − 36 delivered before 1975.
- Thailand − Acquired in 1983.
- United States:
  - United States Armed Forces
    - United States Air Force
    - United States Army − Special Forces and Long-Range Patrols
    - United States Marine Corps − 1940s to 1980s
    - United States Navy − SEAL Teams and Underwater Demolition Teams, often used with a duckbill muzzle attachment for flatter, wider shot spread.
  - Los Angeles Police Department
  - New York Police Department − 1930s to 2009, replaced by the Mossberg 590.
- South Vietnam

== See also ==
- Combat shotguns
- List of shotguns
- Winchester Model 12
- Remington Model 17
