= Stiletto =

Slender knife

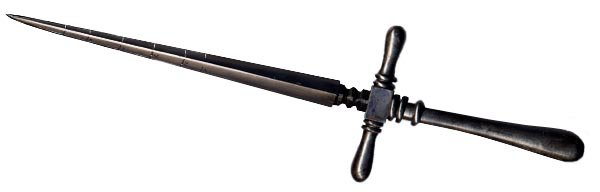
Stiletto

A stiletto (plural stilettos) is a specialized dagger with a long slender blade and needle-like point, primarily intended as a thrusting and stabbing weapon.

The stiletto blade's narrow cross-section and acuminated tip (that is, a tip which tapers to a sharp point) reduce friction upon entry, allowing the blade to penetrate deeply. Some consider the stiletto a form of dagger, but most stilettos are specialized thrusting weapons not designed for cutting or slashing, even with edged examples.

Over time, the term stiletto has been used as a general descriptive term for a variety of knife blades exhibiting a narrow blade with minimal cutting surfaces and a needle-like point, such as the U.S. V-42 stiletto. In American English usage, the name stiletto can also refer to a switchblade knife with a stiletto- or bayonet-type blade design. The term may also describe any exaggeratedly thin and pointed feature, such as a stiletto heel.

== Origins ==
First developed in Italy, the stiletto dates from the late 15th century, and is thought to be a development of the rondel dagger or misericorde, a needle-pointed weapon with a narrow blade designed primarily for thrusting, though possessing cutting edges. Early stilettos normally used a one-piece cast-metal handle which was shaped and turned on a lathe. The stiletto blade was usually hammer-forged into a dense rod with a narrow, triangular cross-section, without any sharpened edges. However, other examples of the period have emerged bearing round, square, or diamond cross-sections.

The Italian word "stiletto" comes from the Latin stilus, the thin pointed Roman writing instrument used to engrave wax or clay tablets in ancient times. The stiletto began to gain fame during the late Middle Ages, when it was the secondary weapon of knights. Originally designed as a purely offensive weapon, the stiletto was used to finish off a fallen or severely wounded heavily armored opponent. The needle-like blade could, if used with sufficient force, penetrate most mail or find its way through gaps in a knight's plate armor, and was narrow enough to pass through the eye slits of the helmeted knight. A severely wounded opponent who was not expected to survive would be given a "mercy strike" (French coup de grâce), hence the name miséricorde. Later, the Gunner's Stiletto became a tool for clearing cannon-fuse touch holes and used in the same manner as an automotive oil dipstick, they were often inscribed with marks indicating levels of powder charges for ranging distance.

== Use as offensive weapon ==
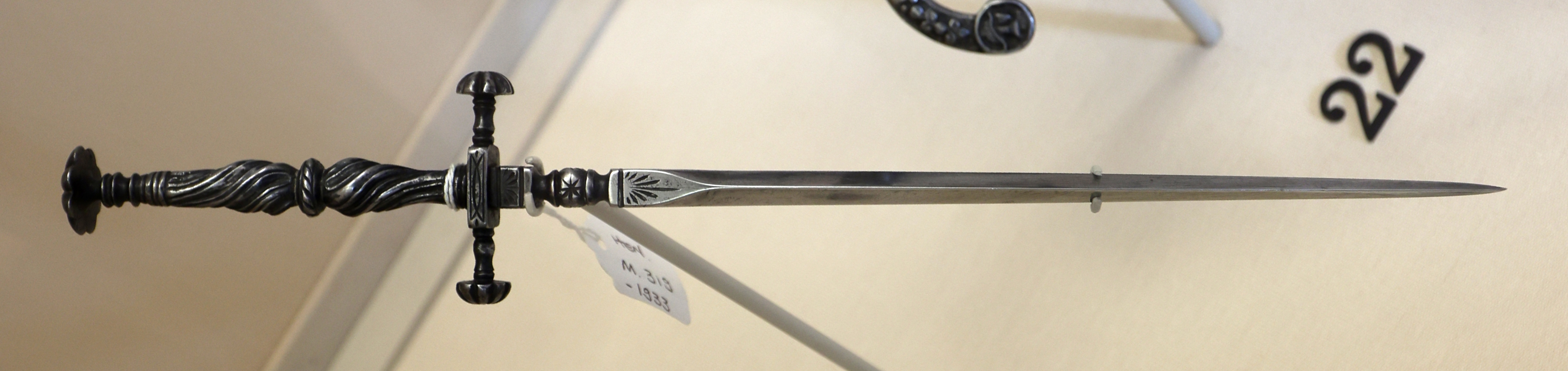
A 16th century stiletto

The stiletto was later adopted throughout Italy as the favored offensive thrusting knife (arma manesca) of the medieval assassin, so much so that it was invariably prohibited as a treacherous weapon (arma insidiosa) by the authorities of the day. The stiletto was preferred by assassins as it was silent, easily concealed inside a sleeve or jacket, and featured a blade capable of easily penetrating the heavy leather and fabric clothing of the day, while inflicting mortal wounds that tended to bleed less than those made by other types of knives.

In Italy, the stiletto began to be employed along with the dagger as a fighting weapon; a 1536 dueling treatise authored by Achille Marozzo, Opera Nova, contains sections on dagger and stiletto fighting. By the time of the Renaissance, the term stiletto had come to describe a range of slender thrusting knives closely resembling the French poignard, many with conventional dagger-profile blades and sharpened edges, but always retaining the slim profile and needle-like point. To lighten the weapon, many stilettos were equipped with blades carrying fullers over a portion of their length.

The stiletto remained a popular weapon of criminals or political assassins from the 16th through the end of the 19th century, particularly in France, Corsica, and Italy. While still used as a weapon of surprise and assassination, the use of stiletto in preference to the dagger in close combat confrontations between adversaries became widespread throughout Italy, Sardinia, and Corsica. The continued popularity of the stiletto in the Kingdom of Sicily resulted in the development of the scherma di stiletto siciliano (Sicilian school of stiletto fighting). A person skilled in the use of a stiletto would thrust the knife deep into the victim, then twist the blade sharply in various directions before retracting it, causing the sharp point to inflict severe internal damage not readily apparent when examining the entrance wound.

The stiletto followed the first wave of Italian diaspora to the city of New Orleans, Louisiana during the mid-19th century, where the knife became a popular weapon of gamblers, gang members, and assorted assassins. The stiletto was involved in so many stabbings and murders in New Orleans that the city passed an ordinance in 1879 outlawing the sale or exhibition for sale of any stiletto within the city limits. Italian immigrants to America frequently purchased or made such knives for self-defense, and the stiletto was used by anarchists as well as by members of various Black Hand organizations to assassinate Italian-Americans and others who either opposed the Black Hand or ignored its demands for blackmail. The Black Hand even established schools for training its members in the use of the stiletto.

== First World War ==
The emergence of fierce hand-to-hand combat in the trenches of World War I created a new need for stabbing weapons, resulting in the reappearance of the dagger and the stiletto. Many versions of these stabbing knives exist, some individually made by soldiers, while others were government-procured and authorized. On the Allied side, the French Lebel M1886 épée (sword) bayonet was frequently cut down and converted into a stiletto or thrusting knife (Poignard-Baïonnette Lebel). The French Nail were locally fabricated and converted bayonets, knives and stabbing weapons for use in the First World War. The Mark I trench knife is an American trench knife designed by officers of the American Expeditionary Force (AEF) for use in the First World War. The M1917 bayonet was designed to be used with the US M1917 Enfield .30 caliber rifle, as well as with the seven different U.S. trench shotguns. The German Nahkampfmesser (translated: close combat knife) was the standard issue German combat knife during the First World War, which remained in service in modified form through the end of the Second World War.

These weapons were used to eliminate sentries in trench raids as well as for personal defense. As a class, these daggers, knives, and stilettos were given the title trench knife.

== Second World War ==
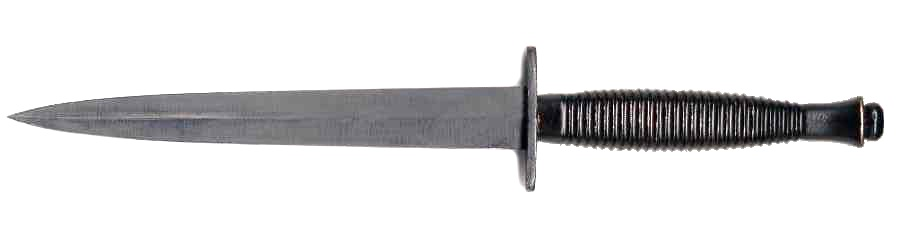
A Fairbairn–Sykes fighting knife (F-S)

World War II saw a resurgence of the stiletto in the form of combat knives for commando raiding forces and other troops who needed a weapon for silent killing. In late 1940, the famed British hand-to-hand combat instructors William E. Fairbairn and Eric A. Sykes designed the Fairbairn–Sykes fighting knife, a double-edged dagger with a long narrow point designed to optimize the blade for thrusting, though it was also capable of slashing strokes if the cutting edges were sharpened.

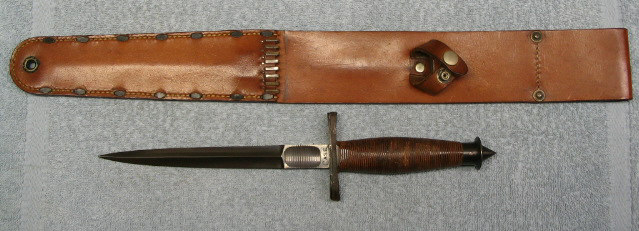
V-42 stiletto

Other variations of the F-S knife soon emerged, including the United States Marine Raider Stiletto, which was based upon the Fairbairn–Sykes knife, and the U.S. V-42 stiletto, designed from the outset to emphasize thrusting over cutting.

== Post-war and successors ==
During the 1950s, large numbers of folding switchblade or automatic opening knives with locking blades were imported from Italy to the United States. Most of these switchblades were side-opening designs, though some employed a telescoping blade. These Italian switchblades were commonly and popularly referred to as stilettos, since most incorporated a long, slender blade tapering to a needle-like point, together with a slim-profile handle and vestigial cross-guard. The majority of these Italian stiletto switchblade knives used a now-iconic bayonet or dagger-style blade with a single sabre-grind edge (often unsharpened) and a false edge of varying length. All of these knives lock the blade in the fully open position, and this lock, combined with the stiletto blade profile, enabled the knife to be used as an effective thrusting or stabbing weapon (unlike most U.S. switchblade designs of the day). Though most switchblade stilettos used a single-edge dagger-type blade, many variations exist, including kris and flat ground blades.

As with the medieval stiletto, the stiletto switchblade was designed primarily as an offensive weapon, optimized for thrusting rather than cutting. The Italian style switchblade's peculiar properties combined a switchblade's easy concealment with the ability to make a surprise offensive thrust and a deep wound capable of reaching vital organs. In use, the knife would normally be concealed from view in the palm with the blade in the closed position. When the target is within range, the blade is quickly opened as part of a continuing underhand thrust into the target's torso.

The stiletto switchblade is still produced in Italy and many other countries, and now includes many derivative folding knife designs that incorporate the same basic 'stiletto' or bayonet-style blade profile, including spring-assist, non-locking, and lock blade variants.

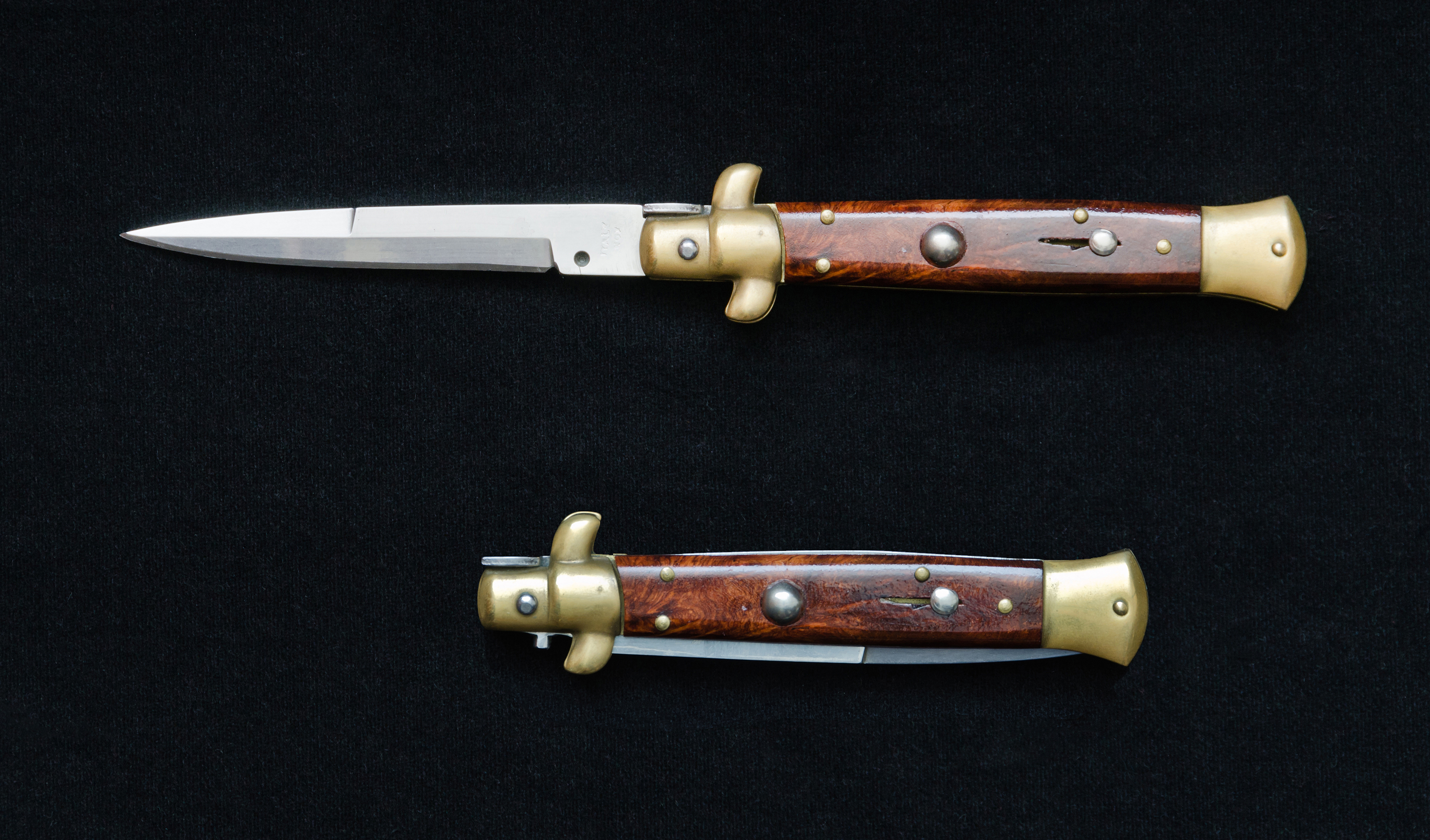
"Italian stiletto" swichblade, open and closed

== See also ==
- List of daggers
