= List of equipment of the United States Army during World War II =

The following is a list of equipment of the United States Army during World War II which includes artillery, vehicles and vessels. World War II was a global war that started in 1939 and ended in 1945. Following the Japanese attack of 7 December 1941, the United States joined the war and started actively supporting the Allies' campaign.

== Knives and bayonets ==
Knives and bayonets
Name	Image	Type	Origin	Notes
M1905 bayonet		Bayonet	United States	
M1917 bayonet		Bayonet	United States	
Mark 1 trench knife		Knife	United States	
M3 trench knife		Knife	United States	
Ka-Bar		Knife	United States	
V-42 stiletto		Dagger	United States	
United States Marine Raider stiletto		Dagger	United States	
Bolo knife		Knife	Philippines	Used by units in the Philippines

== Small arms ==
=== Revolvers and pistols ===
Model	Image	Cartridge	Type	Origin	Details
Colt Model 1903 Pocket Hammerless		.32 ACP	Semi-automatic pistol	United States	
Colt M1911A1		.45 ACP	Semi-automatic pistol	United States	
M1917 revolver		.45 ACP	Revolver	United States	
Colt Official Police		Multiple	Revolver	United States	
FP-45 Liberator		.45 ACP	Single shot Pistol	United States	Dropped into occupied territories for use by insurgents
Smith & Wesson Model 10		.38 S&W	Revolver	United States	

=== Submachine guns ===
Model	Image	Cartridge	Type	Origin	Details
Thompson submachine gun		.45 ACP	Submachine gun	United States	
M3 submachine gun		.45 ACP	Submachine gun	United States	Used by tank crews and combat engineers (sapper). A low-cost replacement for the Thompson
M50 Reising submachine gun		.45 ACP/.22 LR	Submachine gun	United States	
United Defense M42		9×19mm Parabellum, .45 ACP (prototype model only)	Submachine gun	United States	.45 ACP was used only in prototype model.

=== Rifles ===
Model	Image	Cartridge	Type	Origin	Details
M1903 Springfield		.30-06 Springfield	Bolt action sniper rifle	United States	
M1 Garand		.30-06 Springfield	Semi-automatic rifle	United States	Used by all branches of the US military
M1917 Enfield		.30-06 Springfield	Bolt action	United States	
Krag–Jørgensen		.30-40 Krag	Bolt-Action	United States	
M1941 Johnson rifle		.30-06 Springfield	Semi-automatic rifle	United States	
M1 carbine		.30 Carbine	Carbine	United States	
Winchester Model 70		Various	Rifle	United States	

=== Shotguns ===
Model	Image	Cartridge	Type	Origin	Details
Winchester Model 1897		Gauge (firearms)	Shotgun	United States	
Winchester Model 1912		Gauge (firearms)	Shotgun	United States	
Browning Auto-5		Gauge (firearms)	Semi-automatic shotgun	United States	
Winchester Model 21		Gauge (firearms)/.410 bore	Shotgun	United States	.410 bore was used only in deluxe models.
Remington Model 31		Gauge (firearms)	Shotgun	United States	
Stevens Model 520/620		Gauge (firearms)	Shotgun	United States	
Ithaca 37		Gauge (firearms)	Shotgun	United States	

=== Grenades ===
Grenades and grenade launchers
Name	Image	Type	Origin	Details
Mk 2 grenade		Grenade	United States	
M7 grenade launcher		Grenade launcher	United States	Fired smoke, fragmentation, and anti-armor grenades
M16/M18 smoke grenade		Smoke grenade	United States	Created in 1942, entering service shortly after. The M16 was only briefly produced before being redesigned and replaced by the M18.

=== Recoilless rifles ===
Model	Image	Cartridge	Type	Origin	Details
M18 recoilless rifle		57×303mmR	Recoilless rifle	United States	Was not developed until the final stages of the war in 1945
M20 recoilless rifle		75 x 408 mm R HE, HEAT, Smoke	Recoilless rifle	United States	Was not developed until the final stages of the war in 1944

=== Flamethrowers ===
Model	Image	Cartridge	Type	Origin	Details
M1A1 flamethrower			Flamethrower	United States	
M2 flamethrower			Flamethrower	United States	Wildly used in the pacific
Ronson flamethrower			Vehicle mounted flamethrower	United Kingdom	Developed in the United Kingdom, however, was used exclusively by the United States and Canada

=== Obstacle-clearing explosive charges ===
Model	Image	Cartridge	Type	Origin	Details
M1A1 Bangalore torpedo		TNT, C4	Explosive charge	United States	Used to destroy barbed wire obstacles and clear paths through minefields

=== Machine guns ===
Model	Image	Cartridge	Type	Origin	Details
Infantry and dual-purpose machine guns
Lewis gun		.30-06 Springfield	Light machine gun	United Kingdom United States	
M1917 Browning machine gun		.30-06 Springfield	Heavy machine gun	United States	
M1918 Browning Automatic Rifle		Various	Various	United States	Was used as an automatic rifle, machine gun, assault rifle, and squad automatic weapon
M1919 Browning machine gun		Various	Medium machine gun	United States	
M1941 Johnson machine gun		.30-06 Springfield	Light machine gun	United States	
Browning M2HB (.50 BMG)		.50 BMG	Heavy machine gun	United States	Primarily used as a vehicle mounted weapon
Bren light machine gun		.303 British	Light machine Gun	United Kingdom	Not standard issue; used in joint training exercises and mixed Allied operations.
.30 AN/M2 "Stinger" field modification		7.62 mm caliber	Machine gun	United States	Used by the USMC Only
Vehicle and aircraft machine guns and autocannons
M4 autocannon		37x145mmR M4	Autocannon	United States	
M2 cannon		20 mm caliber	Autocannon	United States	
.50 caliber machine gun (Browning M2)		.50 BMG	Heavy machine gun	United States	

== Artillery ==
Model	Image	Caliber	Type	Origin	Details
Infantry mortars
M1 mortar		81 mm (3.2 in)	Mortar	United States	
M2 4.2 inch mortar		107 mm (4.2 in)	Mortar	United States	
M2 mortar		60 mm (2.36 in)	Mortar	United States	
Rocket artillery
T34 Calliope		114 mm/183 mm 4.5 in/7.2 in	Rocket artillery	United States	
T40 Whizbang		180 mm (7.2 in)	Rocket artillery	United States	
Field artillery
75 mm gun M2/M3/M6		75 mm (2.95 in)	Field gun	United States	Copy of a British weapon
QF 2.95-inch mountain gun		75 mm (2.95 in)	Mountain gun	United Kingdom	Used in the Philippines
M116 howitzer		75 mm (2.95 in)	Pack howitzer	United States	
M101 howitzer		105 mm (4.1 in)	Howitzer	United States	
M3 howitzer		105 mm (4.1 in)	Light howitzer	United States	
Canon de 155 mm GPF		155 mm (6.10 in)	Field gun/coastal artillery	France	
M114 155 mm howitzer		155 mm (6.1 in)	Howitzer	United States	
155 mm gun M1 Long Tom		155 mm (6.1 in)	Towed field artillery	United States	The 4.5-inch gun M1 was a variant to fire British ammunition.
M115 howitzer		203 mm (8.0 in)	Howitzer	United States	
8-inch gun M1		203 mm (8.0 in)	Heavy gun	United States	
240 mm howitzer M1		240 mm (9.4 in)	Howitzer	United States	
Fortress and siege guns
5-inch/51-caliber gun		127 mm (5 in)	Various	United States	Was primarily used as a naval gun, however, also saw use as coastal defence and fortification
8-inch gun M1888		203 mm (8 in)	Coastal defence and fortification	United States	Saw little service in the war, was primarily used in World War I
8-inch Mk. VI railway gun		203 mm (8 in)	Railway gun	United States	Was a variation of the 8-inch M1888
M1918 240 mm howitzer		240 mm (9.5 in)	Howitzer	United States	
12-inch coast defense mortar		305 mm (12 in)	Coastal artillery	United States	Also used as a railway gun
12-inch gun M1895		305 mm (12 in)	Coastal artillery	United States	
14-inch M1920 railway gun		355.6 mm (14 in)	Railway gun	United States	
16-inch/50-caliber M1919 gun		405 mm (16 in)	Coastal artillery	United States	
Anti-tank guns
37 mm gun M3		37 mm (1.45 in)	Anti-tank gun	United States	
Ordnance QF 6-pounder		57 mm (2.24 in)	Anti-tank gun	United Kingdom	
3-inch gun M5		76.2 mm (3 in)	Anti-tank gun	United States	

== Anti-tank weapons (besides anti-tank guns) ==
- M1 Rocket Launcher (Bazooka)
- Boys anti-tank rifle
- M18 recoilless rifle
- M20 recoilless rifle

== Vehicles ==
Vehicles (armored and non-armored, tracked and wheeled, amphibious, etc.)
Name	Image	Type	Origin	Notes
Tanks
M1 combat car		Light tank	United States	
M2 light tank		Light tank	United States	
M2 medium tank		Medium tank	United States	
M3 Stuart		Light tank	United States	
M5 Stuart		Light tank	United States	Upgraded version of the M3 Stuart
M3 Lee		Medium tank	United States	
M4 Sherman		Medium tank	United States	Most widely used tank by the Allies
M22 Locust		Airborne light tank	United States	
M26 Pershing		Heavy/medium tank	United States	First saw combat in late February 1945; with the famous tank duel involving a Panther tank and a M26 Pershing during the Battle of Cologne.
M6 heavy tank		Heavy tank	United States	
T29 heavy tank		Heavy tank	United States	
T30 heavy tank		Heavy tank	United States	
Marmon-Herrington CTLS		Light tank	United States	Primarily used as an export for the Dutch
M24 Chaffee		Light tank	United States	
Self-propelled guns
M7 Priest		Self-propelled artillery	United States	
M10 tank destroyer		Tank destroyer	United States	
M12 gun motor carriage		Self-propelled artillery	United States	
Howitzer motor carriage M8		Self-propelled artillery	United States	
T28 super-heavy tank		Tank destroyer	United States	Only a couple prototypes built; never used in the war
M18 Hellcat		Tank destroyer	United States	
M36 tank destroyer		Tank destroyer	United States	
M40 gun motor carriage		Self-propelled artillery	United States	
T40/M9 tank destroyer		Tank destroyer	United States	
M41 howitzer motor carriage		Self-propelled artillery	United States	
M43 howitzer motor carriage		Self-propelled artillery	United States	
Armored cars
M2 half-track car		Reconnaissance vehicle	United States	
M3 scout car		Armored car	United States	
M8 Greyhound		Armored car	United States	Had a turret-less variant that was named M20
M38 Wolfhound		Armored car	United States	
M29 Weasel		Tracked vehicle	United States	
S1 scout car		Armored car	Australia	
T17E1 Staghound		Armored car	United States	
Armored carriers
M3 half-track		Armoured personnel carrier	United States	
Universal Carrier		Armoured personnel carrier	United Kingdom	
M5 half-track		Armoured personnel carrier	United States	An alternative production variant of the M3 half-track used for Lend-Lease
Trucks
Dodge WC series		Truck	United States	
Willys MB		Truck	United States	
Motorcycles
Harley-Davidson WLA		Motorcycle	United States	
Tractors
M4 tractor		Artillery tractor	United States	
M5 tractor		Artillery tractor	United States	
Aquatic vessels
Landing Vehicle Tracked		Landing craft	United States	
DUKW		Amphibious vehicle	United States	
LCVP (United States)		Landing craft	United States	
Ford GPA		Amphibious vehicle	United States	
DD tank		Amphibious tank	United States	Upgraded version of the M4 Sherman
Landing craft tank		Landing craft	United States	Used to transport tanks
Landing Craft Infantry		Landing craft	United States	Used to transport infantry

== Aircraft ==
=== United States Coast Guard ===
- Consolidated PBY-5 Catalina amphibian flying boat
- Curtiss SOC-4 Seagull floatplane
- Douglas RD-4 Dolphin amphibian flying boat
- Fairchild J2K liaison
- Grumman JF-2 Duck amphibian floatplane
- Grumman J2F-4 Duck amphibian floatplane
- Grumman JRF Goose amphibian flying boat
- Grumman J4F Widgeon amphibian flying boat
- Hall PH flying boat
- Lockheed XR3O-1 executive transport
- Lockheed R5O-1 Lodestar executive transport
- Naval Aircraft Factory N3N-3 trainer
- Vultee SNV trainer

=== United States Navy ===
- r-Aeronca LNR observation/liaison/trainer
- Beechcraft SNB Navigator trainer
- Beechcraft JRB transport
- Beechcraft GB Traveler transport
- Bell XTDL Airacobra fighter
- Bell XF2L Airacomet jet fighter
- Boeing PB Flying Fortress heavy bomber
- Boeing P2B Superfortress heavy bomber
- Boeing 314 Clipper impressed flying boat transport
- Boeing XF8B prototype carrier-based fighter-bomber
- Boeing XPBB Sea Ranger flying boat/patrol bomber
- Brewster F2A Buffalo carrier-based fighter
- Brewster SBA/Naval Aircraft Factory SBN carrier-based scout bomber/trainer
- Brewster SB2A Buccaneer carrier-based scout bomber
- Budd RB-1 Conestoga transport
- Cessna JRC transport
- Consolidated PB4Y-1 Liberator patrol bomber
- Consolidated PB4Y-2 Privateer patrol bomber
- Consolidated PBY/PBN Catalina seaplane patrol bomber
- Consolidated PB2Y Coronado flying boat/patrol bomber
- Consolidated XP4Y Corregidor flying boat/patrol bomber
- Culver TDC radio-controlled drone
- Culver TD2C radio-controlled drone
- Curtiss F11C Goshawk biplane fighter
- Curtiss R5C Commando transport
- Curtiss XF14C prototype carrier-based fighter
- Curtiss SBC Helldiver carrier-based scout bomber
- Curtiss SB2C Helldiver carrier-based dive bomber
- Curtiss SOC Seagull observation aircraft
- Curtiss SO3C Seamew observation aircraft
- Curtiss SC Seahawk ASW aircraft
- Curtiss SNC Falcon trainer
- Douglas BD Havoc attack bomber
- Douglas BTD Destroyer carrier-based torpedo bomber
- Douglas A-26 Invader attack bomber
- Douglas RD Dolphin amphibian flying boat transport
- Douglas R2D transport
- Douglas R3D transport
- Douglas R4D transport
- Douglas R5D transport
- Douglas SBD Dauntless carrier-based dive bomber
- Douglas TBD Devastator carrier-based torpedo bomber
- Fairchild JK liaison
- Fairchild J2K/GK liaison/trainer
- Goodyear FG Corsair carrier-based fighter/bomber
- General Motors FM Wildcat carrier-based fighter
- Great Lakes BG target drone (withdrawn as carrier bomber)
- Grumman F3F carrier-based fighter
- Grumman F4F Wildcat carrier-based fighter
- Grumman XF5F Skyrocket carrier-based prototype fighter
- Grumman F6F Hellcat carrier-based fighter
- Grumman F7F Tigercat carrier-based fighter
- Grumman F8F Bearcat carrier-based fighter
- Grumman JRF Goose flying boat
- Grumman J4F Widgeon flying boat
- Grumman JF Duck amphibian shipboard spotter
- Grumman J2F Duck amphibian shipboard spotter
- Grumman TBF/TBM Avenger carrier-based torpedo-bomber
- Howard GH/NH Nightingale liaison/ambulance aircraft
- Interstate TDR assault drone
- Lockheed JO transport/gunnery trainer
- Lockheed R2O Electra transport
- Lockheed R5O Lodestar transport
- Lockheed PBO patrol bomber
- Lockheed PV-1 Ventura patrol bomber
- Lockheed PV-2 Harpoon patrol bomber
- Lockheed FO-1 fighter
- Martin JM Marauder medium bomber
- Martin JRM Mars transport flying boat
- Martin M-130 impressed flying boat
- Martin PBM Mariner flying boat
- Martin PB2M Mars prototype patrol flying boat
- Naval Aircraft Factory N3N trainer
- Naval Aircraft Factory TDN assault drone
- North American NJ-1 trainer
- North American PBJ Mitchell medium/anti-ship bomber
- North American SNJ trainer
- North American ETF-51D fighter
- Northrop BT-1 dive bomber
- Piper LNP training glider
- Piper NE observation/liaison aircraft
- Pratt-Read LNE training glider
- Ryan FR Fireball carrier-based mixed-propulsion fighter
- Ryan NR Recruit trainer
- Schweizer LNS training glider
- Sikorsky HNS helicopter
- Sikorsky HO2S helicopter
- Sikorsky HO3S helicopter
- Sikorsky JRS transport amphibian
- Sikorsky JR2S impressed transport flying boat
- Sikorsky XPBS-1 patrol flying boat
- Stearman N2S trainer
- Stinson OY Sentinel observation/liaison aircraft
- Stinson R3Q trainer/utility aircraft
- Spartan NP trainer
- Taylorcraft LNT observation/liaison aircraft
- Timm N2T Tutor trainer
- Vought F4U Corsair carrier-based fighter
- Vought O3U Corsair scout
- Vought OS2U Kingfisher observation aircraft
- Vought SBU carrier-based dive bomber
- Vought SB2U Vindicator carrier-based dive bomber
- Vought TBU Sea Wolf/Consolidated TBY Sea Wolf carrier-based torpedo-bomber
- Vought V-173 experimental aircraft
- Vultee SNV trainer
- Waco LRW troop glider
- Waco YKS-7 transport/liaison

=== United States Marine Corps ===
- Allied Aviation XLRA glider
- Brewster F2A Buffalo fighter
- Vought F4U Corsair fighter/attack
- Consolidated PB4Y-2 Privateer patrol bomber
- Curtiss R5C Commando transport
- Curtiss SBC Helldiver dive bomber
- Curtiss SB2C Helldiver dive bomber
- Douglas BD Havoc attack/medium bomber/target tug
- Douglas RD Dolphin amphibian transport
- Douglas R3D transport
- Douglas R4D Skytrain transport
- Douglas R5D Skymaster transport
- Douglas SBD Dauntless dive bomber
- Grumman F4F Wildcat fighter
- Grumman F6F Hellcat fighter/night fighter
- Grumman JRF Goose amphibian transport
- Grumman TBF Avenger torpedo bomber
- Lockheed JO-2 transport
- Lockheed R5O Lodestar transport
- Lockheed PV-1 Ventura patrol bomber
- Martin JM Marauder attack/medium bomber/target tug
- North American PBJ Mitchell attack/medium bomber
- North American SNJ trainer
- Northrop F2T Black Widow night fighter
- Pratt-Read LNE training glider
- Schweizer LNS training glider
- Stinson OY Sentinel observation/liaison aircraft
- Vought F4U Corsair "Fighter/night fighter"
- Vought SB2U Vindicator dive bomber

=== United States Army Air Forces ===
- Aeronca L-3 observation/liaison aircraft
- Airspeed Oxford trainer
- Avro AT-20 Anson trainer
- Beechcraft XA-38 Grizzly prototype attack bomber
- Beechcraft C-45 Expeditor transport/trainer
- Beechcraft AT-10 Wichita advanced trainer
- Bell YFM-1 Airacuda interceptor
- Bell P-39 Airacobra fighter
- Bell P-59 Airacomet jet fighter
- Bell P-63 Kingcobra fighter
- Bell XP-77 prototype lightweight fighter
- Boeing P-26 Peashooter fighter
- Boeing XB-15/XC-105 long-range bomber/transport
- Boeing B-17 Flying Fortress heavy bomber
- Boeing B-29 Superfortress heavy bomber
- Boeing-Stearman PT-17 Kaydet primary trainer
- Boulton Paul Defiant trainer/target tug
- Brewster 339C/D Buffalo (ex-Dutch KNIL-ML) fighter
- Bristol Beaufighter fighter
- Budd C-93 Conestoga transport
- Cessna AT-8/AT-17/UC-78 advanced trainer/light transport
- Consolidated B-24 Liberator heavy bomber
- Consolidated B-32 Dominator heavy bomber
- Consolidated OA-10 Catalina Army PBY flying boat/patrol bomber
- Consolidated Vultee XP-81 fighter
- Vultee XA-41 prototype ground attack aircraft
- Culver PQ-8/A-8 radio-controlled target aircraft
- Culver PQ-14 Cadet radio-controlled target aircraft
- Curtiss A-12 Shrike attack bomber
- Curtiss XA-14/Curtiss A-18 Shrike attack bomber
- Curtiss-Wright AT-9 Jeep advanced twin-engine pilot trainer
- Curtiss-Wright C-46 Commando transport
- Curtiss-Wright C-76 Caravan transport
- Curtiss O-52 Owl observation aircraft
- Curtiss P-36 Hawk fighter
- Curtiss P-40 Warhawk/Kittyhawk/Tomahawk fighter
- Curtiss XP-46 prototype fighter
- Curtiss-Wright XP-55 Ascender prototype fighter
- Curtiss YP-60 fighter
- Curtiss XP-62 prototype fighter
- Curtiss A-25 Shrike Army SB2C dive bomber
- de Havilland F-8 Mosquito reconnaissance aircraft
- Douglas A-20 Havoc attack bomber
- Douglas A-26 Invader attack bomber
- Douglas XA/XB-42 Mixmaster prototype bomber
- Douglas B-18 Bolo ASW/medium bomber
- Douglas XBLR-2/XB-19 prototype heavy bomber
- Douglas B-23 Dragon medium bomber
- Douglas C-32 transport
- Douglas C-47 Skytrain transport
- Douglas C-54 Skymaster transport
- Douglas C-110 (ex-Dutch Douglas DC-5) transport
- Douglas O-31 observation aircraft
- Douglas O-43 observation aircraft
- Douglas O-46 observation aircraft
- Douglas A-24 Dauntless Army SBD dive bomber
- Grumman OA-9 Goose Army JRF flying boat
- Grumman OA-14 Widgeon Army J4F patrol aircraft
- Fairchild UC-61/86 Argus liaison aircraft/trainer
- Fairchild AT-21 Gunner advanced/gunnery trainer
- Fairchild PT-19/23/23 primary trainer
- Federal AT-20 - Ansons purchased for Lend-Lease as bomber trainer
- Fisher XP-75 Eagle prototype fighter
- Fleetwings BT-12 basic trainer
- Howard UC-70 Nightingale liaison aircraft
- Interstate L-6 Grasshopper observation/liaison aircraft
- Lockheed UC-101 Vega executive transport
- Lockheed UC-85 Orion executive transport
- Lockheed C-36/Model 10 Electra transport
- Lockheed C-40/Model 12 Electra Junior transport/gunnery trainer
- Lockheed C-56/C-57/C-59/C-60/C-66/C-104 Lodestar transport
- Lockheed A-29 Hudson patrol bomber
- Lockheed C-69 Constellation transport
- Lockheed B-34/B-37 Lexington medium bomber
- Lockheed P-38 Lightning fighter
- Lockheed P-80 Shooting Star jet fighter
- Martin A-30 Baltimore Lend-lease attack bomber
- Martin B-10/Martin B-12 medium bombers
- Martin B-26 Marauder medium bomber
- McDonnell XP-67 prototype fighter
- Noorduyn C-64 Norseman transport
- North American A-36 Invader/Apache dive bomber/attack aircraft
- North American B-25 Mitchell medium bomber
- North American XB-28 prototype medium bomber
- North American BT-9 basic trainer
- North American BT-14 basic trainer
- North American BC-1 basic combat trainer
- North American AT-6 Texan advanced trainer
- North American O-47 observation aircraft
- North American P-51 Mustang fighter
- North American P-64 fighter/advanced trainer
- North American P-82 Twin Mustang
- Northrop A-13/A-16/A-17/A-33 attack aircraft
- Northrop XP-56 Black Bullet prototype fighter
- Northrop P-61 Black Widow night fighter
- Northrop XP-79 prototype interceptor
- Piper L-4 Grasshopper observation/liaison aircraft
- Republic P-43 Lancer fighter
- Republic P-47 Thunderbolt fighter
- Republic XP-72 prototype fighter
- Ryan PT-16/PT-22 Recruit primary trainer
- St. Louis YPT-15 primary trainer
- Seversky AT-12 Guardsman advanced trainer
- Seversky BT-8 basic trainer
- Seversky P-35 fighter
- Sikorsky R-4 & R-6 Hoverfly helicopters
- Sikorsky R-5 helicopter
- Stinson UC-81/AT-19 Reliant trainer
- Stinson O-49/L-1 Vigilant observation/liaison aircraft
- Stinson O-62/L-5 Sentinel liaison aircraft
- Supermarine Spitfire fighter/reconnaissance
- Taylorcraft O-57/L-2 Grasshopper observation/liaison aircraft
- Vultee A-31/A-35 Vengeance dive bomber
- Vultee BT-13/BT-15 Valiant basic trainer
- Vultee XP-54 prototype fighter
- Vultee P-66 Vanguard fighter
- Waco CG-3 troop glider
- Waco CG-4 troop glider
- Waco PT-14 primary trainer
- Westland Lysander liaison

=== Captured ===
- MP 40
- Mercedes-Benz 770 - Captured German car used by US General Staff
- Messerschmitt Bf 109
- Messerschmitt Bf 110 - Captured German heavy fighter aircraft and was never used in combat
- Marder III
- Mitsubishi A6M Zero - Captured aircraft use for flight testing and never used in combat
- Luger P08
- Walther P38
- Volkswagen Kübelwagen
- MG 42
- Type 92 battalion gun - Captured Japanese light howitzers used by American forces
- Type 89 15 cm cannon - Captured Japanese heavy field guns but was never used in combat by American forces
- Messerschmitt Me 262 - Captured German jet used for testing and never used in combat
- Pak 43
- Jagdpanzer IV - Captured German tank destroyers used by American forces
- Dornier Do 335 - Captured German heavy fighters being researched by American forces
- Jagdtiger - Captured German heavy tank destroyers never used in combat
- leFH 18 howitzer
- Type 92 HMG
- Panzerfaust
- Panzer II - Captured German light tanks used by American forces
- Panzerwerfer - Captured German armored rocket launchers salvaged by American forces
- Panther tank - Captured German medium tanks used by American forces
- Tachikawa Ki-54 - Captured Japanese transport evaluated by American forces and never used in any battles
- Stielhandgranate 24
- Sd.Kfz. 251
- Schwerer Panzerspähwagen - Captured reconnaissance vehicle used by American forces
- Sd.Kfz. 2 - Captured German Tracked motorcycle used by American forces
- StG 44
- Semovente da 75/34 - Captured Italian self-propelled gun used by American forces
- Junkers Ju 87 - Captured German dive bombers but never used in combat
- MG 34
- Karabiner 98k
- Nambu pistol
- Guntō
- Aichi E16A Zuiun - Captured Japanese recon seaplane tested by American forces
- Arisaka rifle
- Type 97 sniper rifle
- Type 92 machine gun
- Type 97 automatic cannon
- Type 96 light machine gun
- Raupenschlepper Ost - Captured German tracked truck driven by American forces
- StuG III

== Ship ==
Battleships

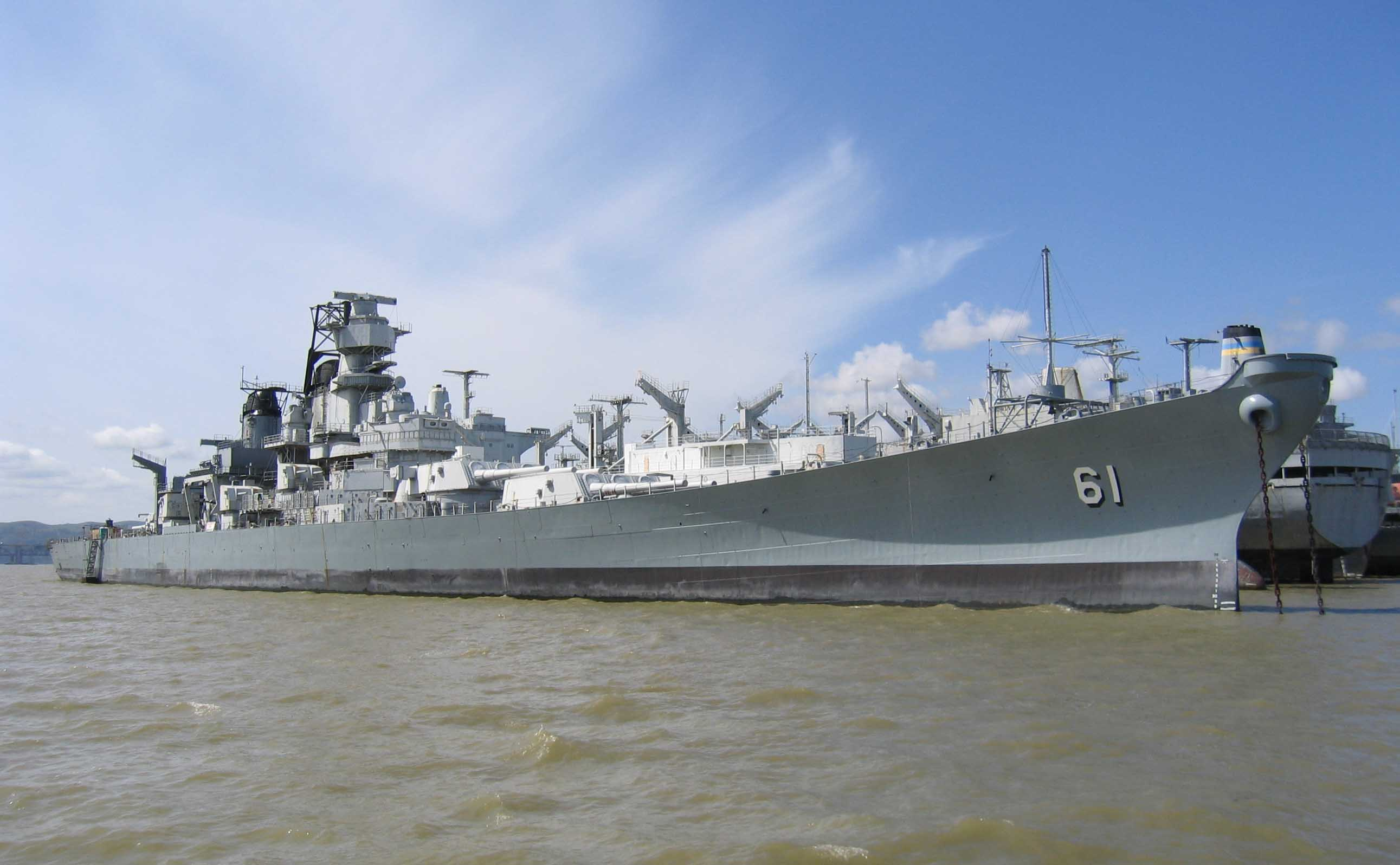
Iowa laid up in Suisun Bay in March 2006

USS Iowa is a retired battleship, the lead ship of her class, and the fourth in the United States Navy to be named after the state of Iowa. Owing to the cancellation of the Montana-class battleships, Iowa is the last lead ship of any class of United States battleships and was the only ship of her class to serve in the Atlantic Ocean during World War II, USS Iowa's main battery consisted of nine 16-inch/50-caliber Mark 7 guns, which could fire 2,700 lb (1,200 kg) armor-piercing shells 20 nmi (23 mi; 37 km). Her secondary battery consisted of twenty 5"/38 caliber guns in twin mounts, which could fire at targets up to 12 nmi (14 mi; 22 km) away. With the advent of air power and the need to gain and maintain air superiority came a need to protect the growing fleet of Allied aircraft carriers; to this end, Iowa was fitted with an array of Oerlikon 20 mm and Bofors 40 mm antiaircraft guns to defend Allied carriers from enemy airstrikes.USS Iowa (BB-61)

== Secret weaponry ==
- Manhattan Project, created the first nuclear weapon

== Uniforms ==
=== Headgear ===
- Campaign hat
- Garrison cap
- Jeep cap
- M1 helmet
- M1C helmet
- Patrol cap
- American fiber helmet (Pith helmet)
- Talker helmet
- Utility cover
- Leather flying helmet
- M2 helmet
- M1938 Tanker helmet

=== Footwear ===
- M43 combat boot
- Jungle boot
- Jump boot
- Type II Service Shoe

=== Other clothing ===
- U.S. Army M1943 uniform
- M1941 field jacket
- US M1938 leggings - A gaiter worn over the Type II Service Shoe
- Pigeon vest - worn by war pigeons

== Radars ==
Radar equipment
Name	Image	Type	Origin	Notes
CXAM radar		Radar picket	United States	Installed on ships
SCR-268 radar		Radar	United States	
SCR-270		Radar	United States	
SJ radar		Radar	United States	Submarine radar

== Missiles and bombs ==
- ASM-N-2 Bat
- Azon (bomb)
- Fat Man (nuclear bomb)
- GB-4
- LBD Gargoyle
- Little Boy (nuclear bomb)
- M47 bomb
- Mark 65 bomb
- Pelican (bomb)
- Pumpkin bomb
- Thin Man (nuclear bomb)
- VB-6 Felix
