= Trench knife =

Type of combat knife

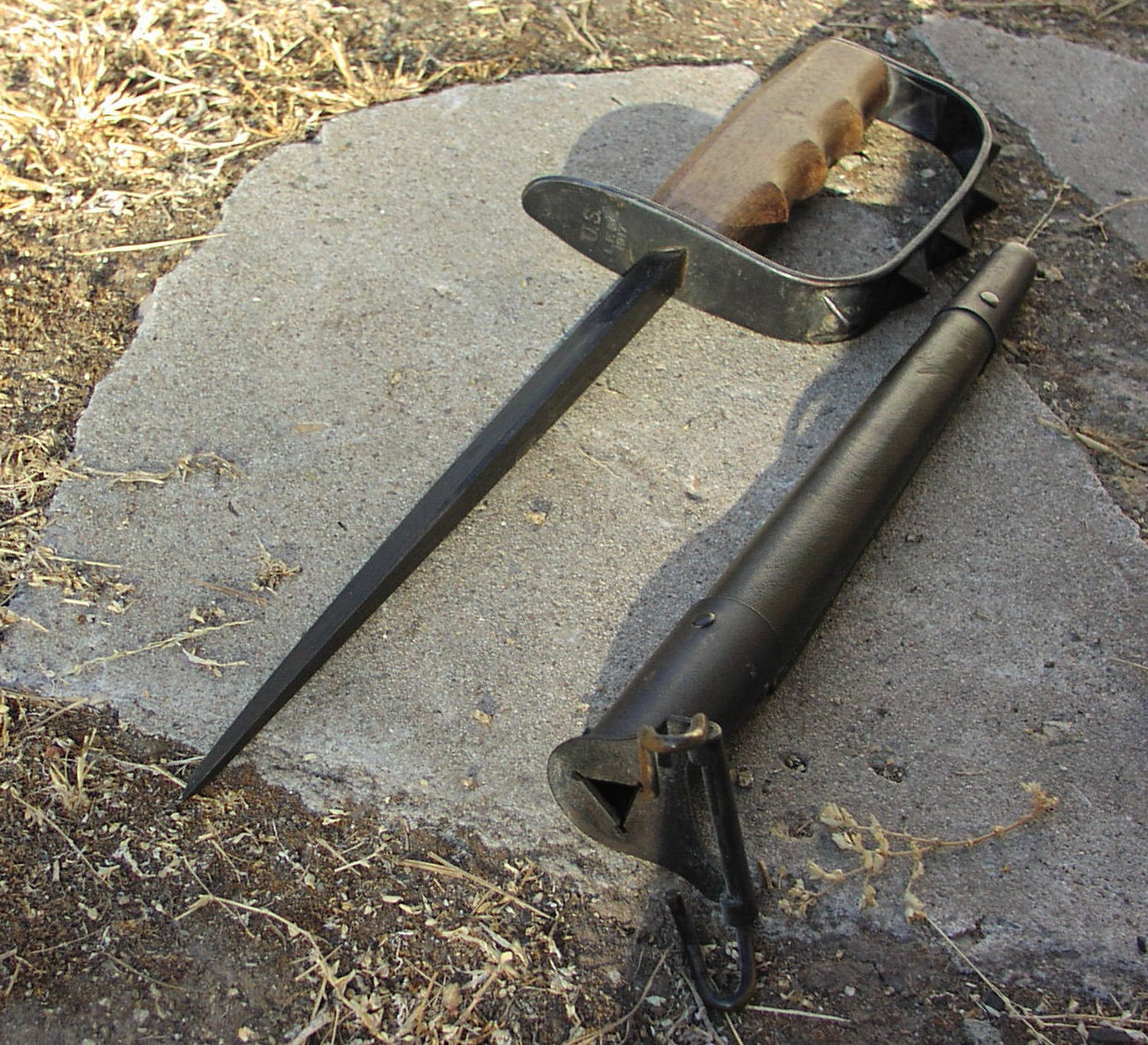
U.S. M1917 "Knuckle Duster" trench knife and leather sheath of World War I. Note the triangular blade with the flat face facing forward, making it suitable only for stabbing and not slashing.

A trench knife is a combat knife designed to kill or incapacitate an enemy at close quarters, such as in a trench or other confined area. It was developed as a close combat weapon for soldiers attacking enemy trenches during the First World War. An example of a World War I trench knife is the German Army's Nahkampfmesser (close combat knife).

During the Second World War, the trench knife, by this time also called a combat knife, was developed into new designs. On the German side, the Nahkampfmesser and associated knives were widely issued to the ordinary soldier for combat and utility purposes, while Allied armies mostly issued trench knives to elite infantry units and soldiers not equipped with the bayonet.

== Early trench knives ==
With the exception of the German Nahkampfmesser (or close combat knife), most early trench knives were fabricated by hand by individual soldiers or blacksmiths for the purpose of silently killing sentries and other soldiers during trench raids. These early "trench knives" were often shortened and sharpened Army-issue bayonets. One type of stabbing weapon, the French nail, was made by cutting and pointing the steel stakes used to support the barbed wire protecting trenches. Some historians say that some trench knives models were inspired by the Bowie knife.

Soon afterwards, these fabricated trench knives were used in defensive close-quarters trench warfare, and such fighting soon revealed limitations in existing designs.

A more elegant form of the French Nail was the Poignard-Baïonnette Lebel M1886/14. Approved as a standard military infantry weapon after its development by Lieutenant Colonel Coutrot of the French Army, the Poignard-Baïonnette Lebel consisted of a long, needle-pointed, stiletto-profile blade with wooden handle and an integrated knuckle guard made of steel. Originally a conversion of the French Épée-Baïonnette Modèle 1886 (bayonet), and designed strictly as an offensive weapon, the Poignard-Baïonnette Lebel used a section of the M1886 Lebel's long, narrow stiletto-type cruciform blade, designed to quickly kill an enemy soldier with a deep thrust. Up to three trench knives could be constructed from a single M1886 Lebel bayonet.

Because French industry was working under wartime conditions with numerous material shortages, often using subcontracted labor, even officially sanctioned French Army trench knives tend to vary significantly from knife to knife. The need for knives was so great that already-understrength French Army formations were forced to demobilize hundreds of former cutlery workers so that they could return to their former jobs and begin quantity production of trench knives for the armed forces. As the war went on, newer and more versatile blade-type trench knife patterns such as the double-edged dagger Couteau Poignard Mle 1916 dit Le Vengeur began to replace the French Nail and earlier stiletto-style trench knives. The French lead in trench knife development was closely followed by the United States, which introduced three successive trench knife models - the M1917, M1918, and Mark I (1918) - all based directly or indirectly upon previous French designs.

=== German Army trench knives ===
The German Nahkampfmesser (translated: close combat knife) was the standard issue German combat knife during the First World War. It remained in service in modified form through the end of the Second World War. Most of these knives had slab wooden grips and metal sheaths and were sturdily made. According to one authoritative source, German-issued trench knives of World War I were "conventional, general-purpose, cut-and-thrust knives" with blades that were "for the most part approximately six inches in length, single-edged with a top leading false edge ... although double-edged blades are occasionally encountered."

After the French Nail was employed against them, German forces on the Western Front also began to employ converted steel barbed-wire stakes as stabbing weapons for use by their own soldiers.

German trench knives carried during World War II were similar in design and are usually known today as boot knives, although they seldom were carried in boots. Most also had steel sheaths with clips that could be attached to boots, webbing or clothing, and most were made by government contractors and issued as combat gear.

=== British and Commonwealth trench knives ===
The British Army and its Commonwealth allies (e.g. Australia, Canada, and New Zealand) used a wide variety of trench knives during World War I. Some were commercial models based on Bowie knives. Others were more specialised types, such as push daggers with a roughly cylindrical aluminium grip which was shaped to fit comfortably when the user's hand made a fist. The attached 4 in (10 cm) blade protruded between the knuckles of the user. It was common British practice for trench knives to be used in combination with other "quiet" weapons, like trench clubs, pickaxe handles and hatchets, during trench raiding expeditions, backed up with revolvers and hand grenades. Many standardized versions were made by government contractors and officially issued. Most had slab wooden grips and metal sheaths and were sturdily made.

During the Second World War, the Fairbairn–Sykes fighting knife was widely issued to forces such as the British Commandos, Royal Marines Commandos, Parachute Regiment, Special Boat Service and the Special Air Service. Though not a true "trench knife" per se, the Fairbairn-Sykes was used for similar purposes.

=== US trench knives ===
The first official U.S. trench knife adopted for service issue was the U.S. M1917 trench knife designed by Henry Disston & Sons and based on examples of trench knives then in service with the French Army. The M1917 featured a triangular stiletto blade, wooden grip, metal knuckle guard, and a rounded pommel. The M1917 proved unsatisfactory in service, and a slightly improved version, the M1918, was adopted within months. Despite this, the M1918 is almost identical to the M1917, differing primarily in the construction and appearance of the knuckle guard. Usable only as stabbing weapons, the M1917 and M1918 frequently suffered broken blades. Their limited utility and general unpopularity caused the AEF to empanel a testing board in 1918 to test various trench knives and select a replacement.

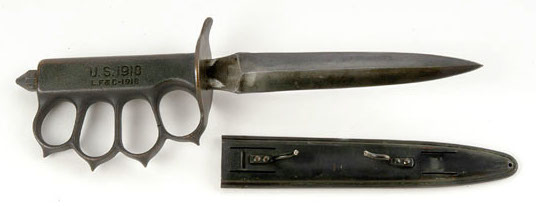
Mark I brass knuckles Trench Knife

This design was followed by the Mark I, which was designed by a board of U.S. Army officers to remedy certain deficiencies of the M1917/18. Adopted in late 1918, with a blade profile patterned after the French Couteau Poignard Mle 1916 dit Le Vengeur, most Mark I knives were completed too late to see service in the trenches of World War I.

During World War II, the Mark I was issued in 1942 and 1943 to airborne troops, Army Rangers, and Marine Raiders. The Mark I featured a full-tang design with a double-edged blade and a heavy bronze hilt incorporating a guard ostensibly shaped as a knuckle duster, though the latter was intended to protect the fingers and prevent the knife from being knocked from the hand while in combat rather than for use as a weapon. Despite their look, the spikes on the knuckles were also defensive in nature, meant to make it difficult for the enemy to grab the knife in combat Reflecting the savagery of hand-to-hand trench warfare, the Mark I's pommel incorporated a so-called 'skull-crusher' cap extension, ostensibly designed to stun or kill an enemy soldier and to provide a secondary weapon in circumstances where the blade was damaged or broken. A special proprietary metal scabbard was issued with the Mark I, capable of accommodating the new knife and its oversized knuckleduster grip handle.

In 1918, Captain Rupert Hughes of the U.S. Army submitted a patent application for a specialized automatic-opening trench knife of his own design, the Hughes Trench Knife. This was a curious device consisting of a folding spring-loaded knife blade attached to a handle which fastened to the back of the hand and was secured by a leather strap, leaving the palm and fingers free for grasping other objects. Pressing a button on the handle automatically extended the blade into an open and locked position, allowing the knife to be used as a stabbing weapon. The Hughes Trench Knife was evaluated as a potential military arm by a panel of U.S. Army officers from the American Expeditionary Force (AEF) in June 1918. After testing the board found the Hughes design to be of no value, and it was never adopted. Hughes went on to patent his automatic trench knife in 1919, though it appears to have never interested any civilian manufacturers.

The U.S. Army adopted the M3 fighting knife as a replacement for the Mark I in 1943. The Mark I required strategic metals to produce and was too costly to place into mass production, and had been criticized as being unsuited to more modern styles of hand-to-hand knife fighting. As the U.S. Catalog of Standard Ordnance Items of 1943 explained: "The Trench Knife M3 has been developed to fill the need in modern warfare for hand-to-hand fighting. While designated for issue to soldiers not armed with the bayonet, it was especially designed for such shock units as parachute troops and rangers." The M3 was first issued to U.S. Army soldiers in 1943, with the first knives going to elite units such as airborne troops and the U.S. Army Rangers. Despite being designed for hand-to-hand warfare, the M3 did not receive universal praise as a fighting knife upon issue to combat units. While well-balanced (some paratroopers and rangers mastered the art of using the M3 as a throwing knife), the M3's blade was criticized as being too narrow for rough usage, particularly for utility tasks such as opening ammo crates and food tins, while its edge was found to be somewhat difficult to sharpen. The blade's secondary edge was also criticized as being too short, limiting the knife's utility when used for backhand slashing strokes. Many features of the M3 were incorporated into the M4 bayonet for the M1 Carbine, the M5 bayonet for the M1 Garand, the M6 Bayonet for the M14 rifle, and finally the M7 bayonet for the M16 rifle. The M3 knife and all of these bayonets fit in the M8A1 scabbard, officially designated as the "Scabbard, Bayonet Knife, M8A1," with the National Stock Number (NSN) 1095-00-508-0339.

Other fighting knives used by U.S. forces have sometimes been referred to as trench knives. These include the stiletto-shaped daggers carried by Marine Corps Raiders in World War II, and fighting-utility knives made by KA-BAR and other manufacturers.

== Reference literature ==
- Wolfgang Peter-Michel Author of: Grabendolche: Militärische Kampfmesser des Ersten Weltkriegs
- Frederick J. Stephens Author of: Fighting Knives: Illustrated Guide to Fighting Knives and Military Survival Weapons of the World
- Eugen von Halász: Deutsche Kampfmesser Band I. Militär-Verlag Klaus D. Patzwall, Norderstedt 1996, ISBN 3-931533-33-6.
- Eugen von Halász: Deutsche Kampfmesser Band II. Militär-Verlag Klaus D. Patzwall, Melbeck 2009, ISBN 978-3-931533-35-9.

== See also ==
- List of daggers
- Rondel dagger, similar blade to a trench knife.
- Combat knife
- Mark I trench knife
- BC-41
- Trench raiding club
- Smatchet, derived from a trench knife.
- Yoroi-dōshi
