= Frederick Stevens =

Frederick Stevens or Stephens may refer to:

- Fred Stevens, British former Grand Prix motorcycle road racer
- Frederick Stevens (American politician) (1861–1923), U.S. representative from Minnesota
- Frederick C. Stevens (New York politician) (1856–1916), New York politician
- Frederic George Stephens (1827–1907), British art critic and member of the Pre-Raphaelite Brotherhood
- Frederick J. Stephens (born 1945), English author of militaria books
- Frederic W. Stevens (1839–1928), American lawyer and banker
- Frederick William Stevens (1847–1900), English architectural engineer
- Frederick P. Stevens (1810–1866), mayor of Buffalo, New York, 1856–1857
- Frederick Stephens (British Army officer) (1906–1967)
- Frederick Stephens (cricketer) (1836–1909), English cricketer and British Army officer
- Frederick Stephens (businessman) (1903–1978), English oilman
- Frederick Stevens (Australian politician) (1820–1888), merchant and politician in colonial Victoria
- Frederick W. Stevens (physicist), American physicist

== See also ==
- Freddie Stevens (1934–2016), English actor
