= Marine Raider Museum =

Marine Corps museum in Quantico, Virginia

Coordinates: 38.497713°N 77.437157°W

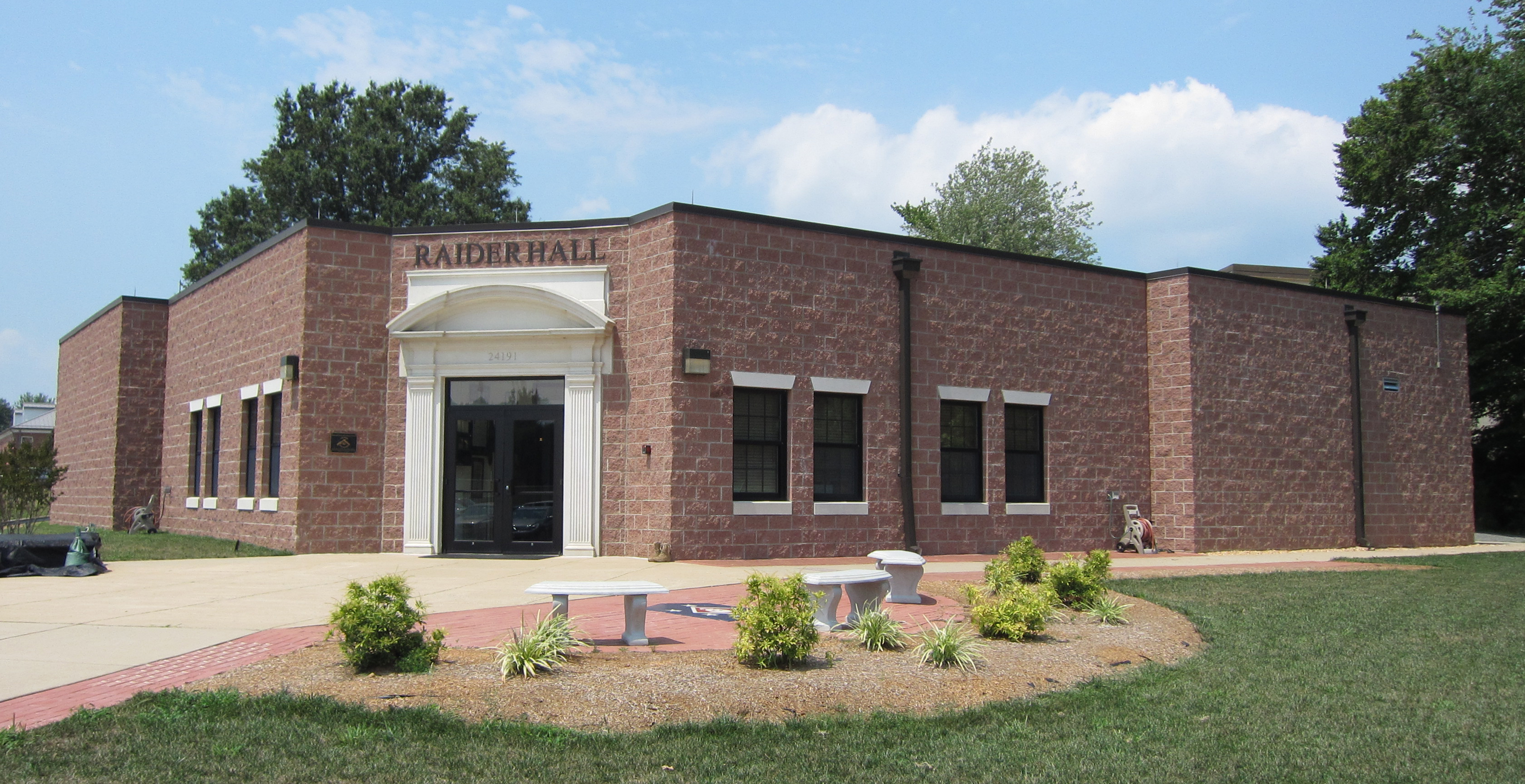
- Established: August 21, 1986
- Location: Raider Hall; 24191 Gilbert Road; Camp Barrett; Marine Corps Base Quantico; Quantico, Virginia; United States
- Type: Military History
- Curator: George MacRae

The Marine Raider Museum is located at Raider Hall, 24191 Gilbert Road, Camp Barrett, Marine Corps Base Quantico, Quantico, Virginia. It contains exhibits related to Marine Raiders. It was originally located in Richmond, Virginia, but was moved to its current location in 2005. In 1997, the museum won the prestigious Colonel John H. Magruder III Award from the Marine Corps Heritage Foundation.

== See also ==
- History of the United States Marine Corps
- United States Marine Raider stiletto
- Marine Corps Museums
