= French nail =

Type of weapon used in the First World War

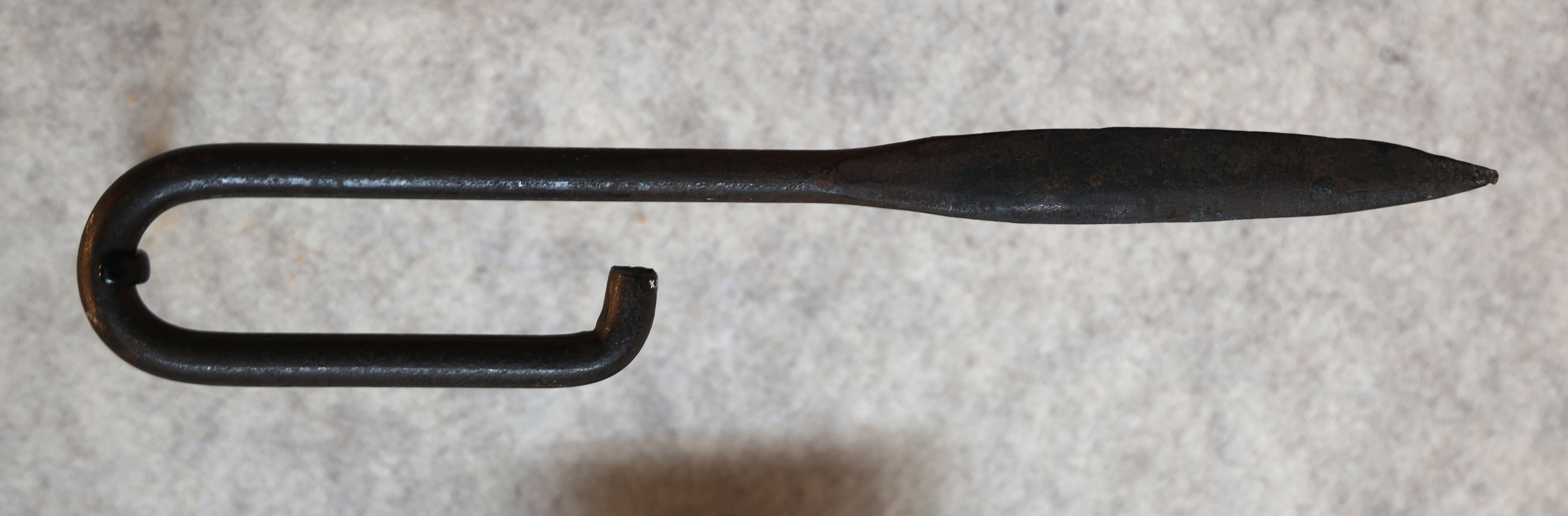
An example of a French nail

French nails were locally fabricated and converted bayonets, knives and stabbing weapons for use in the First World War. These were crude stabbing spikes made by adding a point to a steel stake which had its rearmost section heated and bent into a crude handle.

A more elegant form of the weapon was the introduction of the Poignard-Baïonnette Lebel M1886/14. Approved as a standard military infantry weapon after its development by Lt. Col. Coutrot of the French Army, the Poignard-Baïonnette Lebel consisted of a long, needle-pointed, stiletto-profile blade with wood handle and an integrated knuckle guard made of steel. Originally a conversion of the French Épée-Baïonnette Modèle 1886 (bayonet), and designed strictly as an offensive weapon, the Poignard-Baïonnette Lebel used a section of the M1886 Lebel's long, narrow stiletto-type cruciform blade, designed to quickly kill a surprised enemy soldier with a single deep thrust. Up to three trench knives could be constructed from a single M1886 Lebel bayonet.

Because French industry was working under wartime conditions with numerous material shortages, often using subcontracted labor, even officially sanctioned French Army trench knives tend to vary significantly from knife to knife. The need for knives was so great that already-understrength French Army formations were forced to demobilize hundreds of former cutlery workers so that they could return to their former jobs and begin quantity production of trench knives for the armed forces. As the war went on, newer and more versatile blade-type trench knife patterns such as the double-edged dagger Couteau Poignard Mle 1916 (often called Le Vengeur) began to replace the French nail and earlier stiletto-style trench knives. The French lead in trench knife development was closely followed by the United States, which introduced three successive trench knife models - the M1917, M1918, and Mark I (1918) - all based directly or indirectly upon previous French designs.

== See also ==
- Kunai
