= Misericorde (weapon) =

Medieval knife used to kill wounded knights

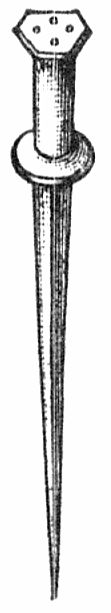
An illustration of a misericorde from a 1908 textbook

A misericorde (/ˌmɪzərɪˈkɔːrd/ or /-zɛrɪ-/; from French miséricorde, "mercy"; itself derived from the Latin misericordia, "act of mercy") was a long and narrow knife used during the High Middle Ages to deliver mercy killings to mortally wounded knights, as it was designed to be thin enough to strike through the gaps in their armour.

The misericorde was used to dispatch knights who had received mortal wounds, which were not always quickly fatal in the age of bladed combat; it could also be used as a means of killing an active adversary, for example during a struggle. The blade could be pushed through the visor or eyeholes of the helm with the aim of piercing the brain, or thrust through holes or weak points in plate armour, such as under the arm, with the aim of piercing the heart.

== History ==
The misericorde was known from the 12th century and has appeared in the armaments of England, Germany, and Persia. It was also used by Polish knights and princes from at least the 14th century.

== See also ==
- Rondel dagger
- Stiletto
