= Poignard =

Poniard
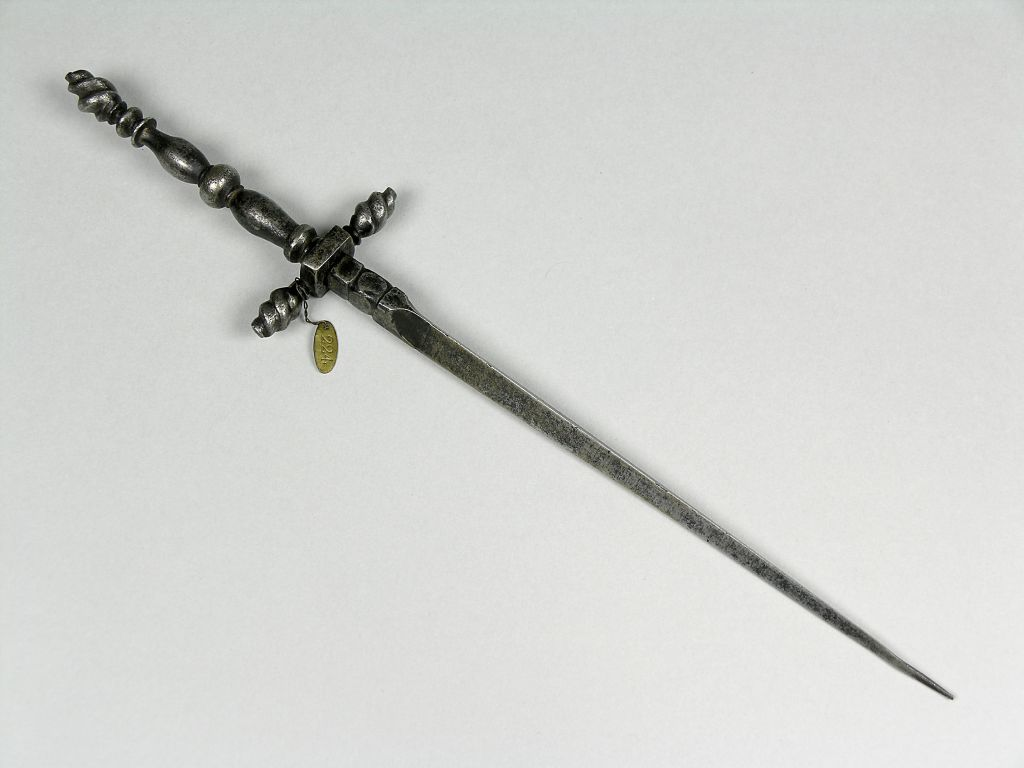
- A poniard in the collection of Thinktank museum, Birmingham, England
- Type: Dagger

Specifications
- Blade type: Double-edged, straight bladed

A poniard (/ˈpɒnjərd/) or poignard (French: [pwaɲaʁ]) is a long, lightweight thrusting knife with a continuously tapering, acutely pointed blade, and a crossguard, historically worn by the upper class, noblemen, or members of the knighthood. Similar in design to a parrying dagger, the poniard emerged during the Middle Ages and was used during the Renaissance in Western Europe, particularly in France, Switzerland, and Italy.

The archaic word "spud" in English could refer to a poignard.

The armed forces of Safavid Iran (1501–1736) used the poniard; it was considered a weapon the ownership of which was especially typical of soldiers who originated from the Caucasus region, particularly Circassians, Georgians, and Armenians.

== Modern use ==
In modern French, the term poignard has come to be defined as synonymous with dague, the general term for "dagger", and in English the term poniard has gradually evolved into a term for any small, slender dagger. In literary usage it may also mean the actual act of stabbing or piercing with a dagger.

The Fairbairn–Sykes fighting knife and the similar V-42 stiletto may be thought of as modern versions of the poignard.

== In culture ==
In Shakespeare's Hamlet (Act V, scene ii; line 3795), Laertes wagers "six French rapiers and poniards, with their assigns, as girdle, hangers, and so" against six Barbary horses owned by King Claudius that in a fencing match Laertes will defeat Hamlet by three or more touches.

In Marlowe's The Massacre at Paris the Duke of Guise kills the Duke of Navarre and the Prince of Condy's schoolmasters with a poignard.

In the Gothic novel The Monk by Matthew Lewis, the novice monk Rosario threatens to commit suicide with a poignard during an argument with the senior monk Ambrosio.

In Robert E. Howard's Red Nails Conan the Barbarian has a poniard.

In Michael Moorcock's Elric of Melnibone Elric is trained in the art of the poignard.
