= Trench raiding =

Small scale night-time surprise attacks in warfare

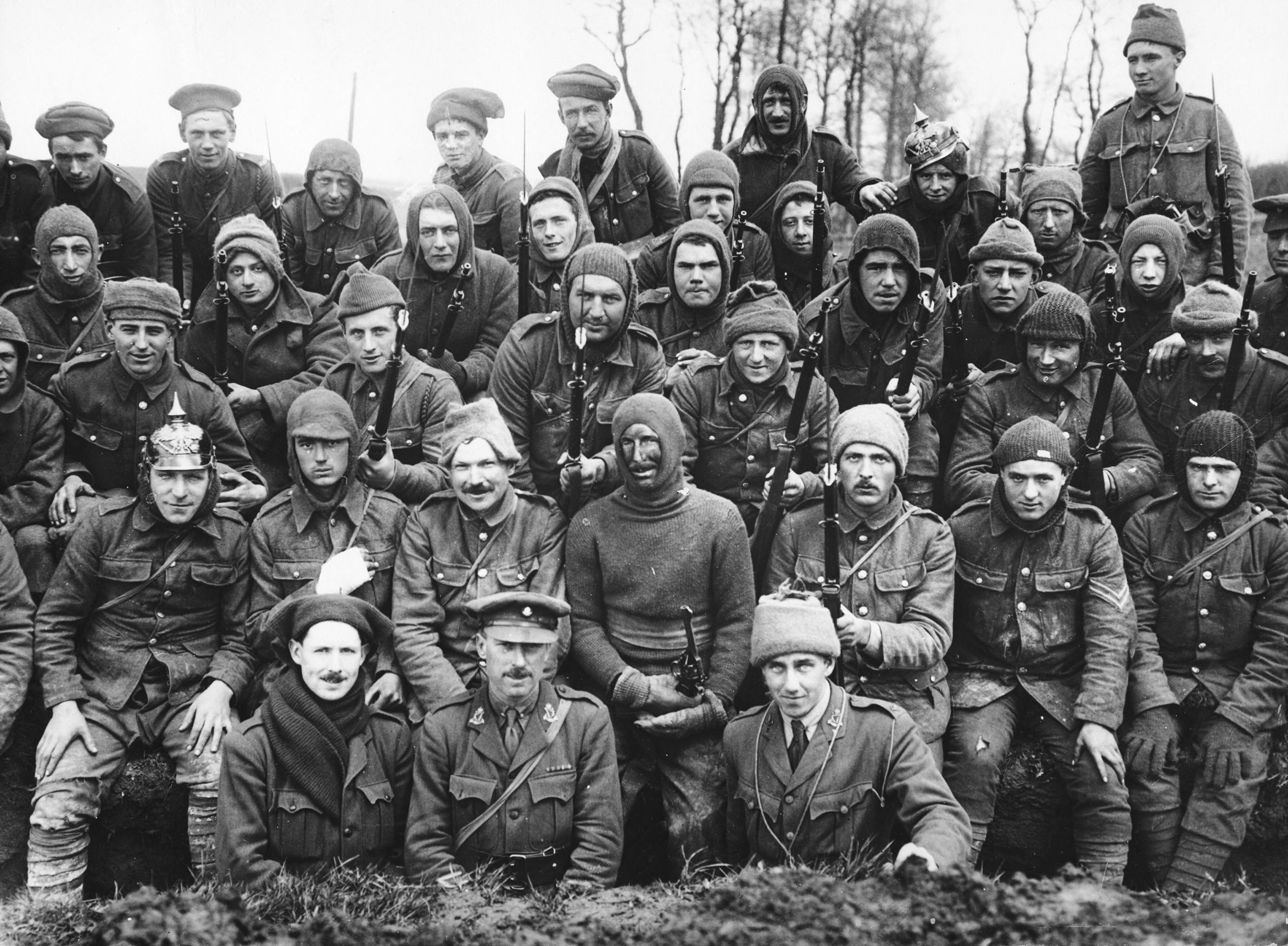
A party returned from raiding a German trench. Two of the men wear Pickelhaube, trophies from the raid.

Trench raiding was a feature of trench warfare which developed during World War I. It was the practice of making small scale night-time surprise attacks on enemy positions.

== Overview ==
Typically, raids were carried out by small teams of men who would black up their faces with burnt cork before crossing the barbed wire and other debris of no man's land to infiltrate enemy trench systems. The distance between friendly and enemy front lines varied but was generally several hundred metres. Any attempt to raid a trench during daylight hours usually would have been pointless because it would have been quickly spotted: enemy machine gunners and snipers had a clear view of no man's land and could easily shoot anyone who showed their head above the trench parapet.

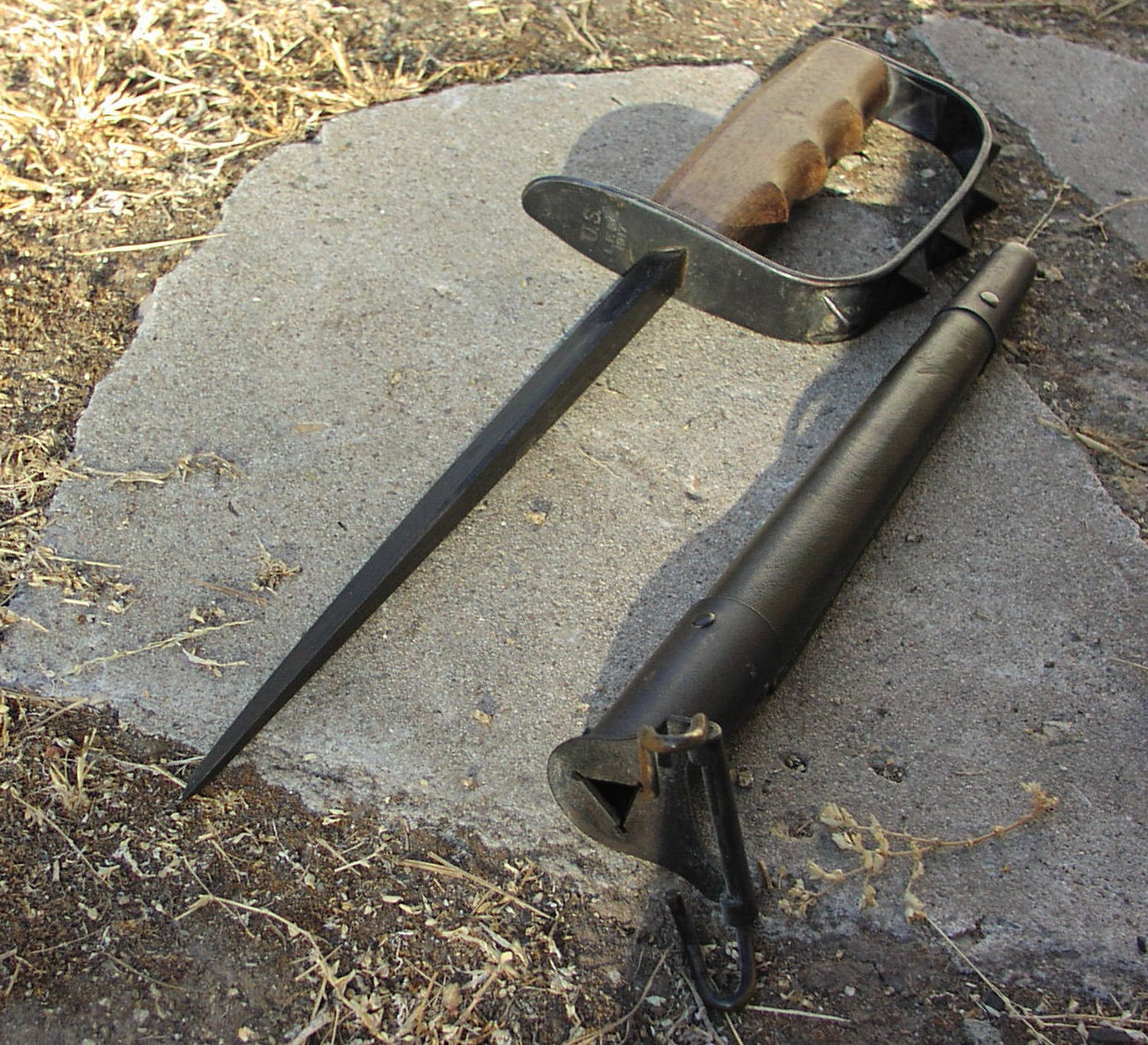
U.S. M1917 "Knuckle Duster" trench knife and leather sheath of World War I

Standard practice was to creep slowly up on the sentries guarding a small sector of an enemy front line trench (looking for the glow of cigarettes in the dark or listening for conversations) and then kill them as quietly as possible. Having secured the trench, the raiders would complete their mission objectives as quickly as possible, ideally within several minutes. Raiders were aware that the longer they stayed in the trench, the greater the likelihood of enemy reinforcements arriving. Grenades would be thrown into dugouts where enemy troops were sleeping before the raiders left the enemy lines to return to their own.

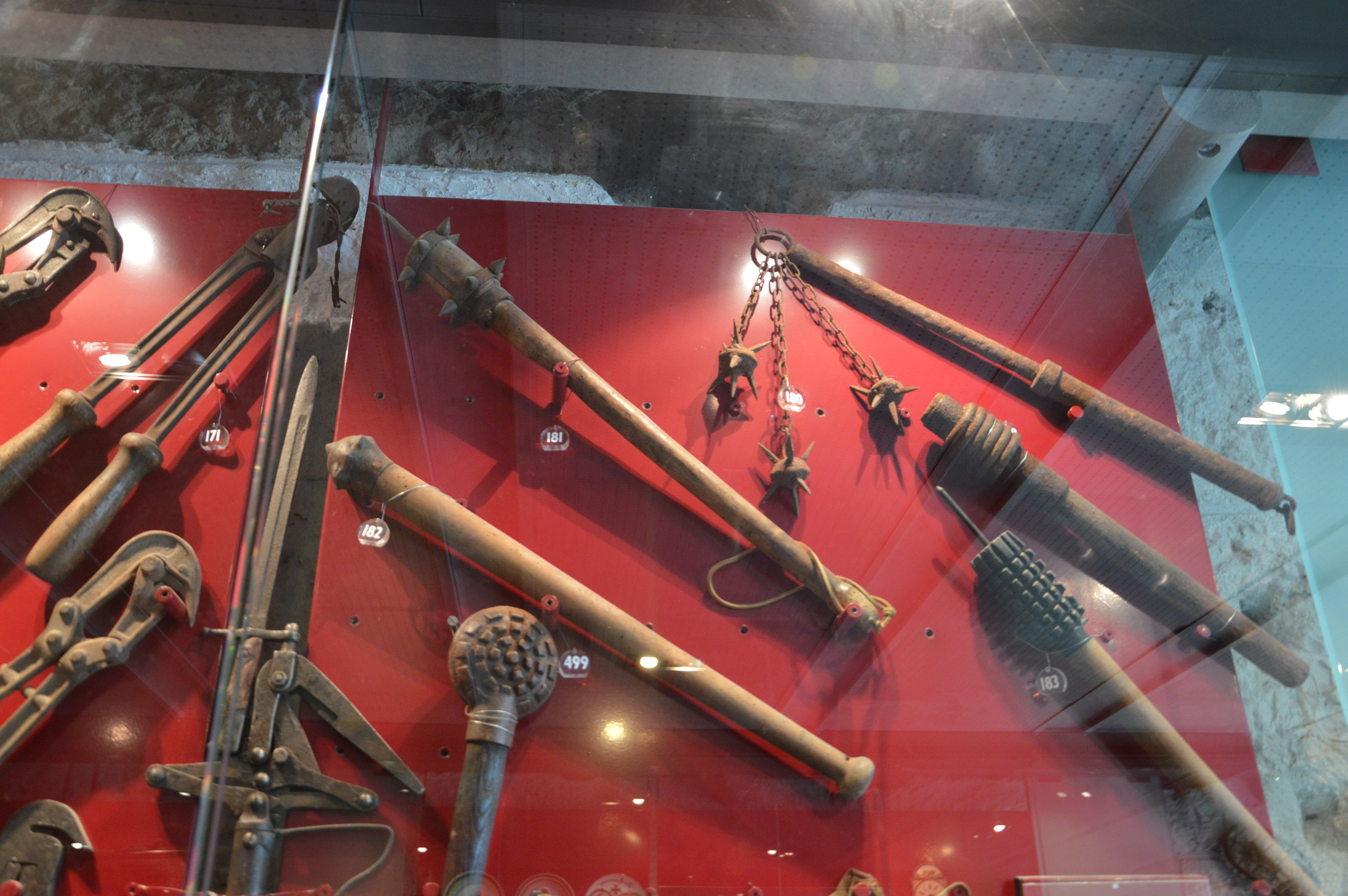

There was a risk that returning raiders could be shot in so-called friendly fire incidents. Therefore, it was a typical procedure to notify sentries along the line whenever raiding parties were sent out, and to use some form of password system so that returning raiders could identify themselves when challenged in the dark.

== Purpose ==
Trench raiding had multiple purposes. The intention would commonly be one or more of the following:

- Capture, wound or kill enemy troops
- Destroy, disable or capture high value equipment, e.g. machine guns like MG08
- Gather intelligence by seizing important documents (e.g. maps) or enemy officers for interrogation
- Reconnaissance for a future massed attack during daylight hours
- Keep the enemy feeling under threat during the hours of darkness, thereby reducing their efficiency and morale
- Maintain aggressiveness and fighting spirit in the troops by sending them on such missions

== Weapons ==
Despite the fact that World War I was the first conflict to be fought by mechanized means, trench raiding was very similar to medieval warfare insofar as it was fought face-to-face with crude weaponry. Trench raiders were lightly equipped for stealthy, unimpeded movement. Normally, raiding parties were armed with deadly homemade trench raiding clubs, machetes, bayonets, entrenching tools, trench knives, hammers, hatchets, pickaxe handles and brass knuckles. The choice of weaponry was deliberate: the raiders' intention was to kill or capture people quietly, without drawing attention to their activities, and this would have been impossible if they had routinely used firearms during raids. Trench raiders were also armed with more modern weapons such as pistols, shotguns, submachine guns, and hand grenades, though these were only intended to be used in an emergency i.e. if the enemy discovered their activities and raised the alarm.

== See also ==
- Hand-to-hand combat
- Peaceful penetration
- Trench warfare
- Stormtroopers (Imperial Germany)
- Arditi

== Bibliography ==
- Godefroy, Andrew (2008), "Daring Innovation: The Canadian Corps and Trench Raiding on the Western Front", in Horn, Bernd (ed.), Show No Fear: Daring Actions in Canadian Military History, Toronto: Dundurn Press, pp. 235–266, ISBN 978-1-55002-816-4
