= Trench raiding club =

Melee weapons used during World War I

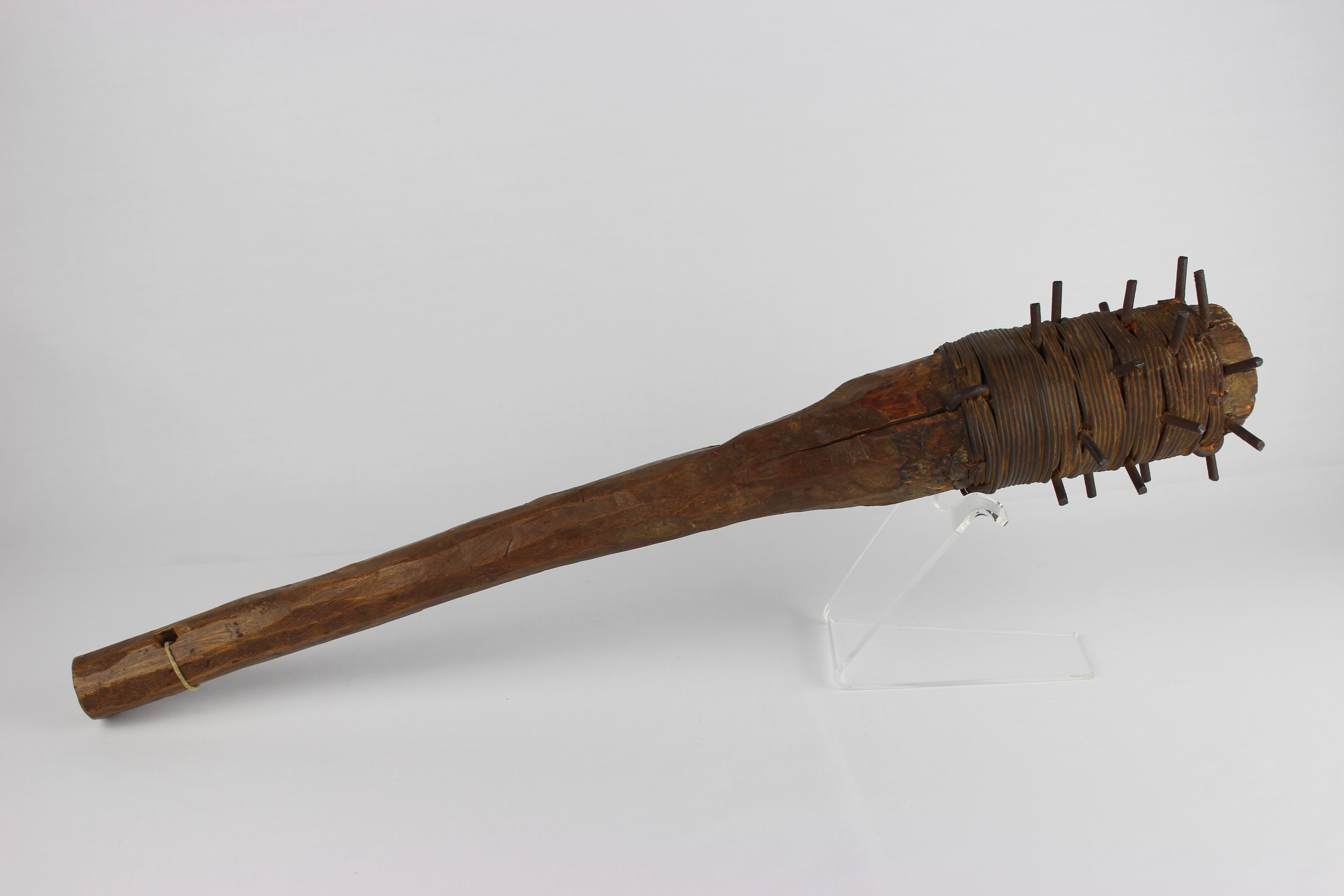
A trench raiding club

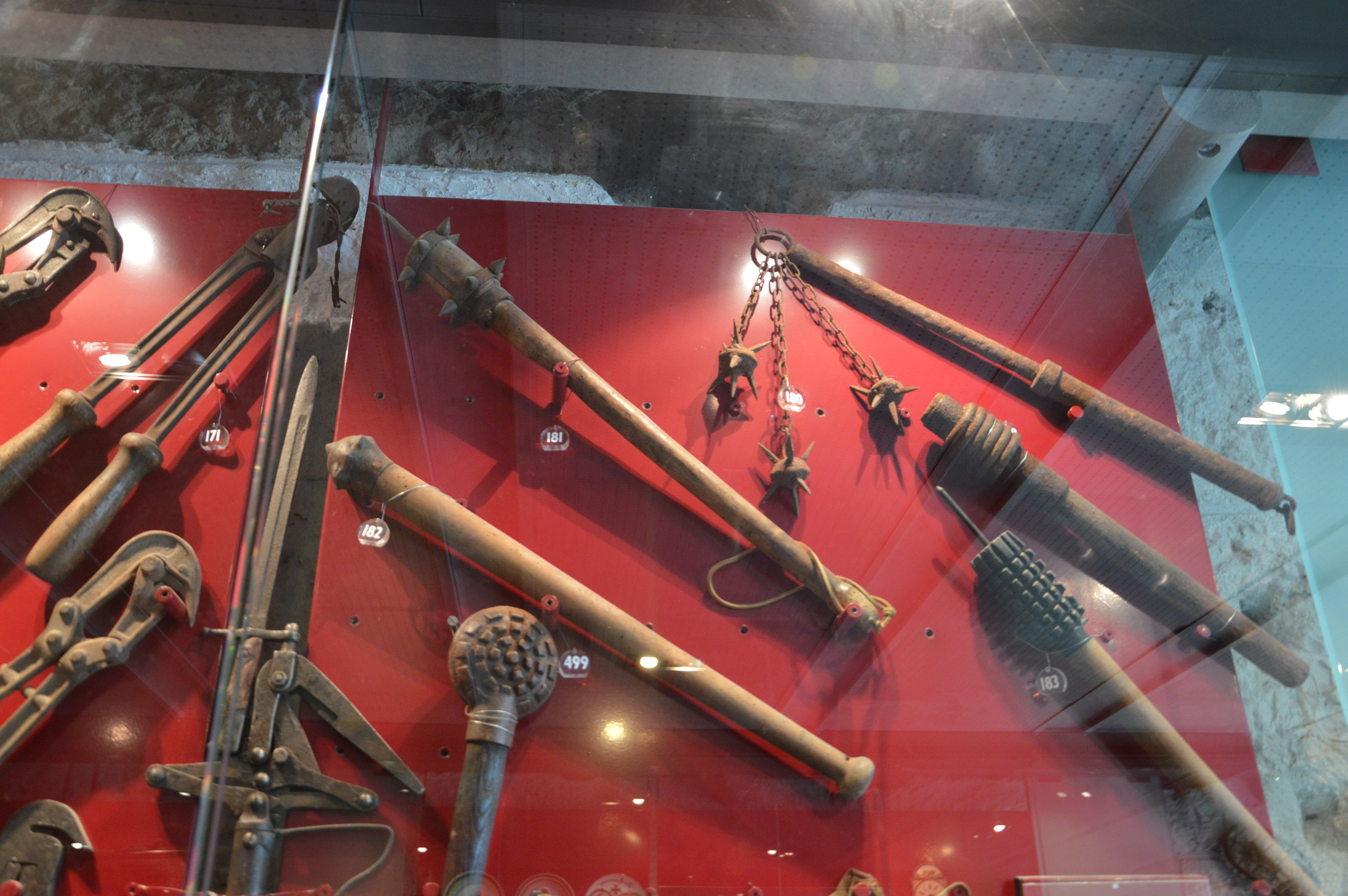
Selection of clubs and a flail used on the Dolomites front

Trench raiding clubs, or trench maces were improvised melee weapons used by both the Allies and the Central Powers during World War I. Clubs were used during nighttime trench raiding expeditions as a quiet and effective way of killing or wounding enemy soldiers. The clubs were usually made out of wood. It was common practice to fix a metal object at the striking end (e.g. such as an empty or deactivated Mills bomb) in order to maximize the injury inflicted. Another common design comprised a simple staff with the end drilled out and a lead weight inserted, with rows of large hobnails hammered in around its circumference. Most designs had some form of cord or leather strap at the end to wrap around the user's wrist.

They were generally used along with other melee weapons such as trench knives, entrenching tools, bayonets, hatchets, hammers, and pickaxe handles – backed up with handguns, shotguns, submachine guns, and hand grenades.

== In popular culture ==
- In the Vietnam War film Platoon (1986), the character Rhah (played by Francesco Quinn) carries a crude wooden staff wrapped in barbed wire, which resembles a makeshift trench club.
- In the film Defendor, the title character uses a trench club on a chain as his primary weapon and states that it had once belonged to his grandfather.
- In the video game Team Fortress 2, a trench club is usable as a melee weapon by the Scout Class, under the name "Boston Basher".
- In the video game Battlefield 1, players can use trench clubs as melee weapons.
- In the video game Verdun, a trench club is available for use by the Canadian raiders.
- In the Netflix television series Stranger Things, the character Steve (played by Joe Keery) carries a trench club made from a baseball bat as his weapon of choice.
- In the comic series and its television adaptation The Walking Dead, the character Negan (played by Jeffrey Dean Morgan in the show) carries a baseball bat wrapped in barbed wire, a makeshift trench club he affectionately nicknames "Lucille."
- In the movie The King's Man (2021), trench clubs are used alongside trench knives and axes during a close-quarter fight between British soldiers and German Sturmtruppen.

== See also ==
- Hand-to-hand combat
- Trench warfare
