= Frederick W. Stevens (physicist) =

American physicist

Frederick Wiley Stevens (August 28, 1861, Goshen, Indiana – May 22, 1932) was an American physicist, known for his research on gaseous explosive reactions. He was elected in 1931 a fellow of the American Physical Society.

== Biography ==
Stevens graduated in 1886 with a bachelor's degree from the University of Michigan. In the year of his graduation, he married Mary Josephine Perrine.

From 1886 to 1888 Stevens did two years at post-graduate work at the University of Michigan. From 1888 to 1891 he was an instructor in physics at the University of Chicago. In 1891 he was appointed a professor of physics at Lake Forest College. In 1892 he studied at the University of Strasbourg (named Universität Straßburg at that time). On a two-year academic leave of absence he did research in physics at the University of Göttingen for academic year 1896–1897 and at the University of Leipzig for the academic year 1896–97.

In the 1920s and early 1930s he worked in Washington, D.C. for the National Bureau of Standards (now named the National Institute of Standards and Technology). He was a member of the Cosmos Club from 1925 until his death in 1932.

== Selected publications ==
- "A Constant Pressure Bomb (Report No. 176) by F. W. Stevens". Aeronautics. Ninth Annual Report of the National Advisory Committee for Aeronautics. U.S. Government Printing Office. 1924. pp. 303–310.
- Stevens, F. W. (1926). "The Rate of Flame Propagation in Gaseous Explosive Reactions". Journal of the American Chemical Society. 48 (7): 1896–1906. doi:10.1021/ja01418a014.
- Stevens, F. W. (1927). "Josiah Willard Gibbs and the Extension of the Principles of Thermodynamics". Science. 66 (1703): 159–163. Bibcode:1927Sci....66..159S. doi:10.1126/science.66.1703.159. PMID 17820056.
- Stevens, F. W. (1928). "The Gaseous Explosive Reaction at Constant Pressure. The Effect of Inert Gases". Journal of the American Chemical Society. 50 (12): 3244–3258. doi:10.1021/ja01399a015.
- "The Gaseous Explosive Reaction at Constant Pressure—The Reaction Order and Reaction Rate (Report No. 337) by F. W. Stevens". Aeronautics. Sixteenth Annual Report of the National Advisory Committee for Aeronautics (Including Technical Reports Nos. 337 to 364). U.S. Government Printing Office. 1930. pp. 67–82.
- "The Gaseous Explosive Reaction—The Effect of Pressure on the Rate of Propagation and Upon the Rate of Molecular Transformation by F. W. Stevens". Aeronautics. National Advisory Committee for Aeronautics (Technical Reports Nos. 369 to 375). U.S. Government Printing Office. 1930. (19 pages)
- Stevens, F. W. (1931). "The Gaseous Explosive Reaction". The Scientific Monthly. 32 (6): 556–565. Bibcode:1931SciMo..32..556S. JSTOR 14910.
