= Coup de grâce =

Act of mercy killing

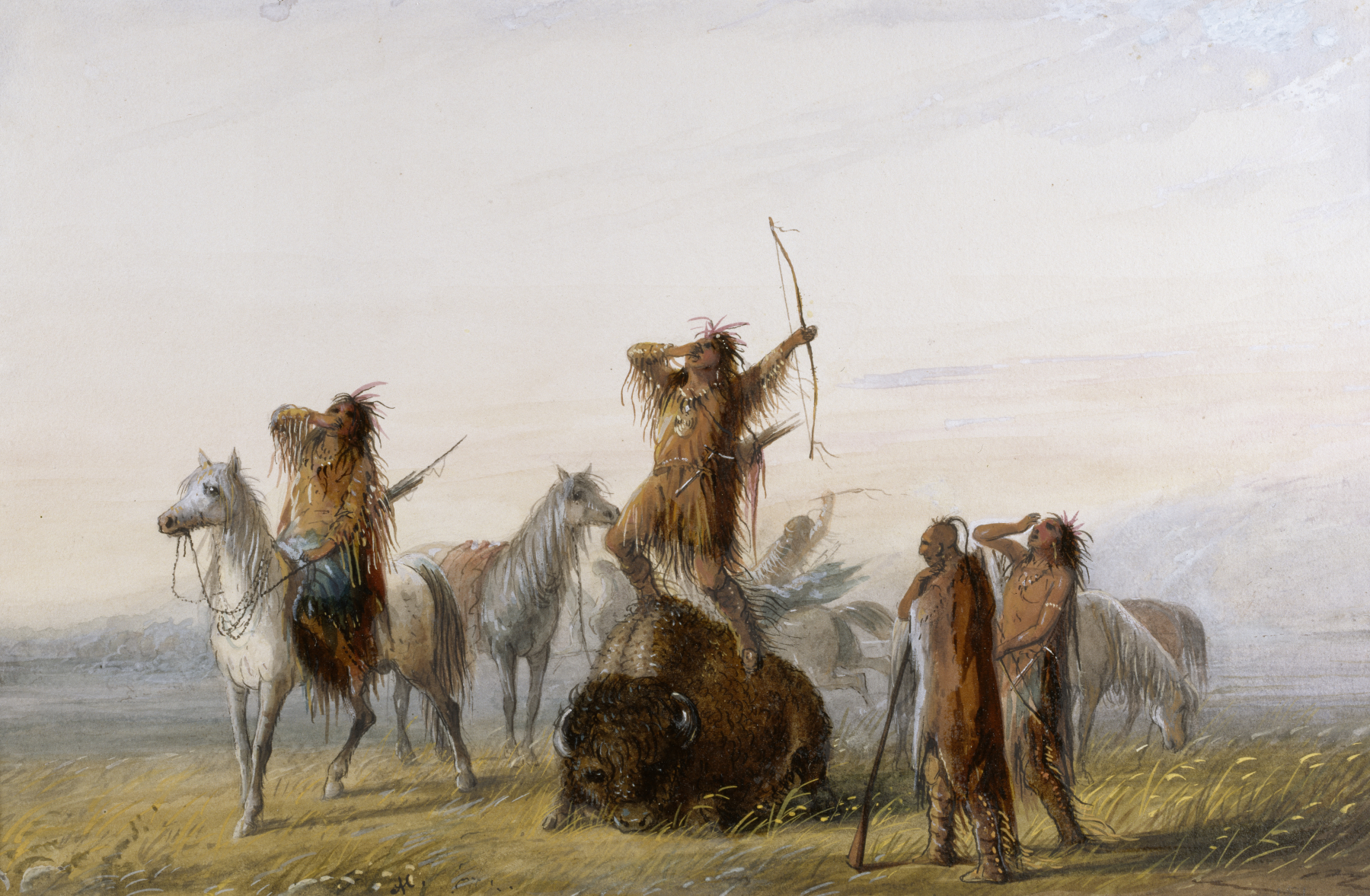
Yell of Triumph, a painting by Alfred Jacob Miller depicting American Indian hunters gathering around a mortally wounded buffalo, and engaging in a victory shout before administering a coup de grâce to the animal with their bows and arrows.

A coup de grâce (/ˌkuː də ˈɡrɑːs/; French: [ku də ɡʁɑs] lit. 'blow of mercy') is a mercy killing in which a mortally wounded person or animal is struck with a weapon or shot with a projectile to kill it quickly and end its suffering, with or without its consent. Veterinarians may administer it to seriously injured animals that are dying or in pain, or hunters to animals they have shot and wounded. With humans, it may be done by a firing squad after a volley of shots at a condemned prisoner, or by soldiers in wartime who have captured a seriously wounded enemy soldier, although this may be a war crime.

== Animal euthanasia ==
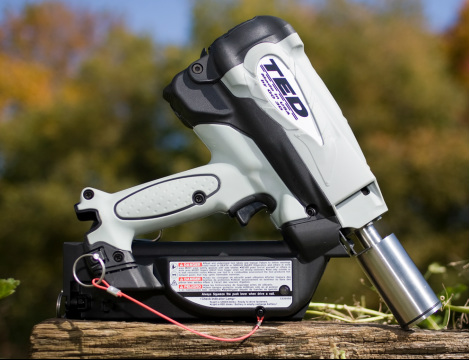
A captive bolt gun for animal euthanasia

If large animals—such as horses, cattle, and deer—are seriously injured, some veterinarians will kill them with firearms. This is a legal animal euthanasia method if performed properly. This may be performed by means of shooting the animal in the forehead with the bullet directed down the spine through the medulla oblongata, resulting in instant death. The risks are minimal if carried out by skilled personnel in a suitable location, or by using a captive bolt gun.

== Firing squad ==
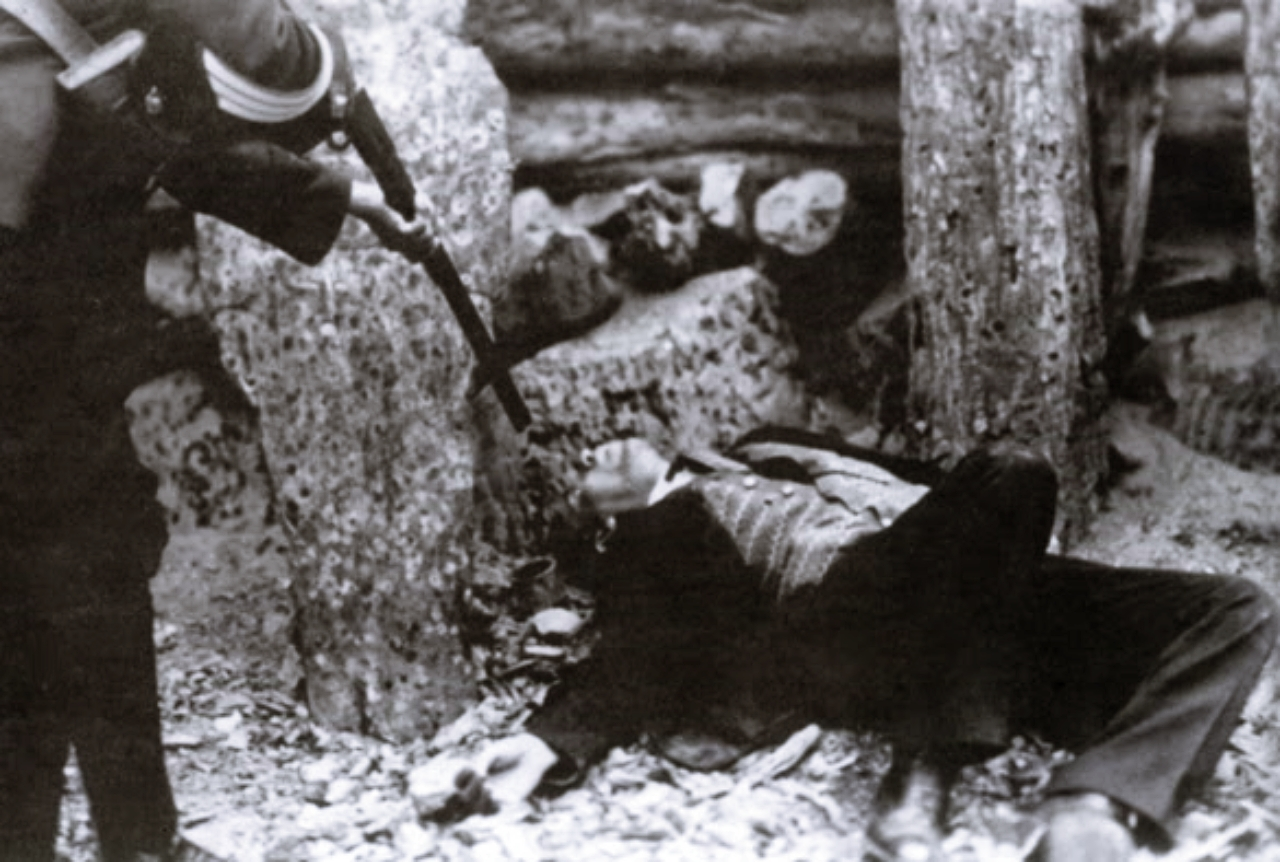
When Jesuit priest Miguel Agustín Pro was shot by a firing squad in 1927, he was only wounded, so a soldier shot him point blank in a coup de grâce.

With firing squad executions, in the past, after the squad fired, the squad's officer may have shot the prisoner with a pistol or rifle at point blank if the initial volley was not fatal.

== Seriously wounded prisoners of war ==
There have been cases where soldiers have shot and killed seriously wounded enemy soldiers who they have captured. Their rationale for shooting seriously wounded prisoners of war varies and may include the desire to end their suffering or revenge. In the 2020s, a soldier giving a coup de grâce to kill an incapacitated or seriously wounded soldier would be a war crime. The laws of war mandate caring for the incapacitated and prohibit mercy killing.

== Figurative use ==
Its meaning has extended to refer to the final event that causes a figurative death or ending. For example, for a company teetering on the brink of bankruptcy, if an insolvency administrator hastens the process, in order to make the wind-down more orderly, this action may be figuratively referred to as a "coup de grâce" for the company.

== See also ==
- Euthanasia
- Misericorde
