= Mark I trench knife =

WW1 era American combat knife

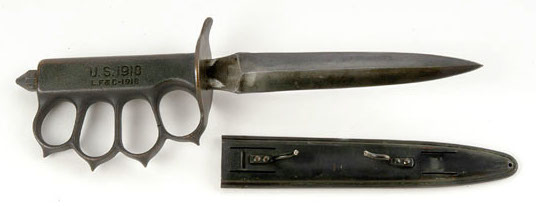
Mark I Trench Knife

The Mark I trench knife is an American trench knife designed by officers of the American Expeditionary Force (AEF) for use in World War I.

== History ==
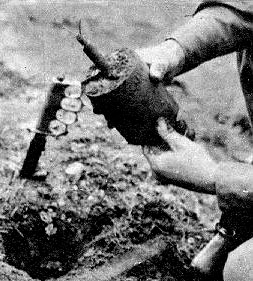
A Mark I knife being used to dig up an anti-personnel mine (specifically, an S-mine).

The Mark I was a development of the earlier U.S. M1917 and the slightly improved M1918 trench knives designed by Henry Disston & Sons of Philadelphia, Pennsylvania.

Both the M1917 and M1918 used a triangular blade and a handle equipped with a guard designed to protect the user's knuckles. By 1918 it was apparent that the M1917 and M1918 designs were too limiting to succeed in their intended role, and a new trench knife design was requested.

On 1 June 1918 a panel of AEF officers conducted an exhaustive field test of various trench knives, including the U.S. M1917, the Hughes trench knife and the standard-issue trench knives of the British and French armies, respectively.

The field test was performed to examine the qualities of each knife based on the following criteria: the ability to carry one-handed while performing other tasks, the quickness or rapidity of employment in action, security of grip, in case the user was stunned or knocked unconscious, ease of carrying when crawling in a low prone position, the probability of the knife being knocked out of hand during a struggle, the suitability of blade weight, length, and shape; and the shape of the handle.

Testing confirmed that the existing M1917 and M1918 designs were in need of improvement. Therefore, a replacement trench knife designated the U.S. trench knife, Mark I was jointly developed by officers of the AEF and the Engineering Division of U.S. Ordnance.

This knife was entirely different from the M1917, bearing a flat double-edged blade, a unique metal scabbard, and a cast-bronze handle with built-in guard for individual fingers.

== Design ==
The Mark I has a 6.75 in (17.1 cm) double-edged dagger blade useful for both thrusting and slashing strokes, unlike previous U.S. trench knives such as the M1917 and M1918.

The Mark I's handle is made of cast bronze and uses a conical steel nut to hold the blade in place.

The Mark I's blade was blued with a black oxide finish, the bronze handle was chemically blackened, with cast spikes on the bow of each knuckle.

The Mark I's spikes were intended to prevent an opponent from grabbing the knife hand, as well as to provide a more concentrated striking surface when employed in hand-to-hand combat.

The AEF stated that the Mark I was a combination of all of the best features of the trench knives evaluated, and the Mark I's double-edged blade was taken directly from the Couteau Poignard Mle 1916 (known as Le Vengeur), a trench knife design then in service with the French Army.

== Production ==
In order to save time in getting the new knife to troops in the field, the first Mark I trench knives were procured from a French manufacturer, Au Lion (Au Lion/Société Générale, France).

Subsequently, the U.S. government placed orders for 1,232,780 Mark I knives with several U.S. contractors, including Landers, Frary & Clark (L.F.&C.) of New Britain, Connecticut; Henry Disston & Sons (HD&S) of Philadelphia; and Oneida Community Limited (O.C.L.), with deliveries to commence in December 1918.

Ordnance records note that the end of the war in November 1918 caused Ordnance to cancel all orders for the Mark I with the exception of a single reduced order for 119,424 knives from Landers, Frary & Clark Co. (L F & C).

Despite this apparent cancellation, otherwise original U.S. Mark I trench knives have been found with HD&S and O.C.L. stamps, with grip handles cast in either bronze or aluminum.

=== French version ===
The French version of the Mark I is stamped on the blade ricasso with a recumbent lion, and the words Au Lion, while the grip is typically stamped "U.S. 1918", and fitted with a four-sided pommel cap.

Made under wartime conditions, the French Mark I knife is generally more roughly finished than U.S. contracted examples, and incorporates several deviations from production specifications.

Several versions of the French model exist - some with grooves on top of the grip, some without, and some bearing letters and numbers cast into the bronze fingerguard.

As steel was a strategic material in wartime France, the French-manufactured Mark I was issued with a proprietary unmarked scabbard made of iron.

=== US-contracted versions ===
U.S.-contracted Mark I knives are stamped on the right side of the brass grip "U.S. 1918", with the contractor's initials located just below. The U.S. knives utilized a six-sided pommel cap.

Like the French-made version, U.S. Mark I knives came with proprietary scabbards designed to accommodate the Mark I knife with its oversized grip, but fabricated of steel instead of iron.

Both blades and scabbards were issued with a blackened finish to prevent reflection.

However, many soldiers (and later, civilian owners) attempted to polish the blades and/or scabbards, believing the blackened finish to be tarnish. As a result, many original Mark I knives and scabbards have lost their original finish.

American-made steel scabbards for the Mark I trench knife were marked "L.F.&C. 1918".

== Criticisms ==
Army and Marine field reports concerning the effectiveness of the Mark I knife were mixed.

Some men liked the design, while others complained that Mark I was poorly balanced, with a relatively thin blade that was prone to snapping at the blade-handle junction, particularly when employed for utility tasks.

Other reports noted that the Mark I's large 'brass-knuckle' fingerguard handle was expensive to produce and limited the number of useful fighting grip positions, while preventing the knife from being carried in a conventional leather sheath or scabbard.

The Mark I also received criticism from Marine Raiders for its poor balance, relatively slow deployment speed and limited quick-kill penetration capability when used in an offensive role.

The Raiders would eventually adopt the United States Marine Raider stiletto, a combat knife with a stiletto-style blade patterned after the Fairbairn–Sykes fighting knife.

== Service ==
Strategic planning by the Allies in 1918 called for the training and equipping of a 4 million man U.S. Army to be landed in France for an offensive in the Spring of 1919.

With the Armistice and the sudden end of hostilities in November 1918, large-scale wartime contracts for Mark I knife production were cancelled. Most Mark I knives that were produced by U.S. manufacturers were never issued, and remained in army storage.

During World War II, stocks of Mark I knives were released for issue to army units with a need for a close-combat fighting knife, though the number of Mark I used was limited.

Of those Mark I knives released for service, most were issued in 1942 and 1943 to soldiers serving in elite army ranger and airborne formations, though some Mark I knives were used by Marine units in 1942 and 1943, in particular marines serving with the four Marine Raider battalions.

Additionally, U.S. war planners had announced a need for a general-purpose trench knife that could fulfill both the fighting and utility roles, while at the same time conserving strategic metal resources.

The Mark I trench knife was replaced in Army service by the M3 trench knife in 1943 as well as old bayonets converted into fighting knives, while the U.S. Marine Corps issued its own combat and utility knife the same year designated the 1219C2, later known as the USMC Mark 2 combat knife aka the USMC knife, fighting utility.

== Users ==
- France
- United States

== See also ==
- List of daggers
