= Frederick J. Stephens =

Frederick John Stephens is an English author of several militaria books, including on Nazi memorabilia.

== Life and career ==
Frederick Stephens grew up in the Manchester area. An only child, he was enlisted at the Lord Derby Grammar School in the late 1950s, and from there was awarded an apprenticeship in printing. Originally working as a compositor (a setter of type, by hand), his entire working career was spent in and around printing and publishing, in every capacity within the industry, and at all levels.

Having pursued many areas of collecting since childhood (when war souvenirs from Nazi Germany were relatively commonplace in post-war Britain), the concept of producing a book about Third Reich edged weapons became a possibility through a first-hand understanding of the printing trade, and how to get a book self-published. It was this opportunity that opened the way for many other future publications.

== Selected works ==
- 1965: A guide to Nazi daggers, swords and bayonets, F. J. Stephens. Privately published by the author
- 1972: Italian Fascist daggers, Militaria Publications Ltd.
- 1973: Hitler Youth History, Organisation, Uniforms, and Insignia, Almark Pub. Co.
- 1975: Weapons and Uniforms of the USSR, co-authored with Ian V. Hogg and John Batchelor, published by Purnell and Sons Ltd., London.
- 1985: The Bayonet: An Evolution and History, co-authored with Roger D. C. Evans, and privately published by Militaria Publications, Milton Keynes
