= United States Marine Raider stiletto =

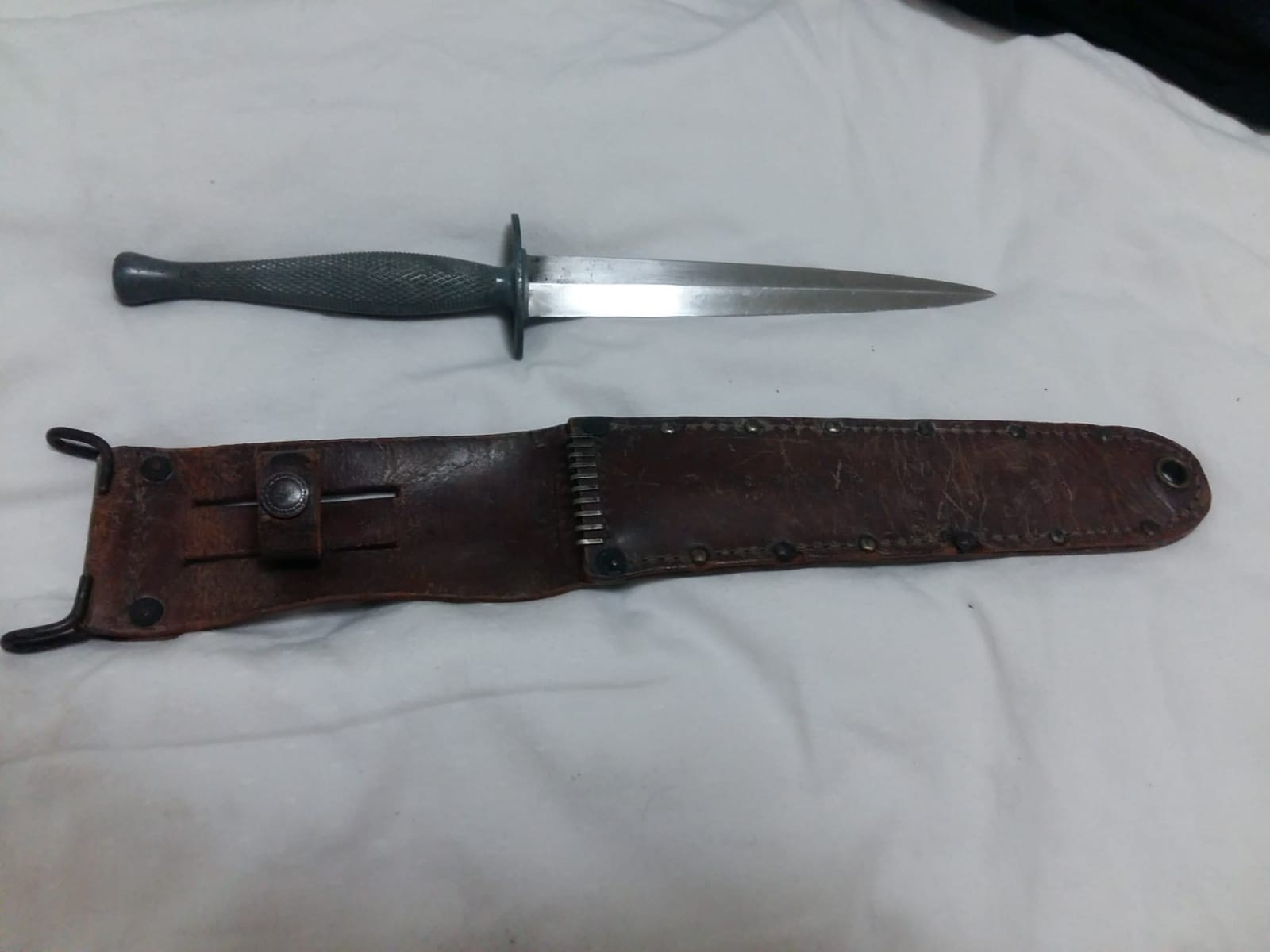
- A Marine Raider stiletto with scabbard
- Type: Dagger
- Place of origin: United States

Service history
- Wars: World War II

The United States Marine Raider stiletto was a combat knife issued to the Marine Raiders and 1st Canadian Parachute Battalion during World War II.

== Background ==
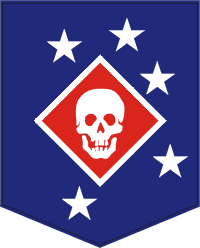
Marine Raiders insignia

At the start of World War II, the Mark I Trench Knife was the only knife issued to Marines.

It was introduced during World War I for trench warfare, but its "knuckle duster" hilt was cumbersome and contained nearly 1 pound (0.45 kg) of brass, making the knife expensive to produce.

In addition, the Mark I could not be held in the "fencing-grip" position, the preferred position for the thrust.

The Marine Corps began issuing the KA-BAR, a combination fighting/utility knife, in 1942 due to the inadequacies of the Mark I.

The Marine Raiders, however, desired a dagger designed solely for knife fighting, but none was available that met the requirements.

== History ==
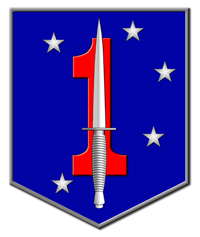
1st MSOB insignia featuring the stiletto

The history of the U.S. Marine Raider Stiletto began at the Commando Training Centre in Achnacarry, Scotland.

The U.S. Marine Raider Stiletto was the first knife in United States Marine Corps history to be designed by a U.S. Marine Corps officer, the then Lieutenant Colonel Clifford H. Shuey, who retired as a brigadier general and was formerly in charge of the Engineer Division at Headquarters Marine Corps.

Shuey largely copied the Fairbairn-Sykes pattern, but changed the material specifications of some components (notably the handle) to reduce the need for high-priority strategic materials.

These changes would eventually result in durability problems for the Raider stiletto.

== Design ==
The stiletto was patterned after the Fairbairn–Sykes fighting knife, in use at the centre before the arrival of the Marine Raiders.

The U.S. Marine Raider stiletto was designed for one purpose: killing the enemy, and its design was not compromised.

The stiletto was a finely designed, almost delicate, single-purpose weapon, which did not include a variety of other tasks normally associated with a machete or utility knife.

=== Hilt ===
The stiletto hilt was die-cast using zinc aluminum alloy, which exhibited the desirable characteristics of sharp casting, low shrinkage, low cost, and minimal use of scarce war-priority metals.

However, over time it was discovered that the zinc ions in this alloy tended to leach out, leaving the casting extremely brittle.

As a result, more than half of the few Raider stilettos still in existence today have very fine hilt cracks or entire portions of the hilt missing, with pieces having simply flaked off; many more have replacement handles.

This decay can be delayed to some extent by coating the hilt with petroleum jelly.

=== Blade ===
The stiletto blade was approximately 0.25 inches (0.64 cm) longer than the Fairbairn-Sykes fighting knife and considerably thinner.

It is believed that thinner design was a manufacturing compromise, rather than an attempt to increase the effectiveness of the blade.

Due to the thin tip, even thinner than the tip of the Fairbairn-Sykes fighting knife, the stiletto was not designed to be used for opening ration cans or as a pry bar to open cases.

=== Sheath ===
Within the same basic model, four different variants of the Marine Raider sheath have been noted and identified.

These variants include the four combinations of with and without steel staples at the throat portion of the sheath and with and without steel tip plates (1.75 in by 2 in), front and back of the sheath to prevent the sharp tip from piercing the scabbard and injuring the wearer.

The purpose of the row of staples at the throat was to prevent the sharp knife from slashing through the sheath.

Unfortunately, these staples could severely scar the stiletto blade. It is believed that these sheath variants evolved by trial and error, as the late issues had both staples and plates.

=== Similarity with the F-S knife ===
Both were designed hilt-heavy to lie in the hand so as to reduce the risk of dropping. Both had a tapered, double-edge blade with stiletto-sharp tip and diamond-shaped cross section, sharpened on both cutting edges all the way to the oval crossguard.

Both had a slender symmetrical grip, with a middle convexity. They weighed the same 0.5 pounds (0.23 kg). The primary difference was that the U.S. Marine Raider stiletto hilt was a one-piece construction, die-cast directly onto the blade tang.

== Manufacturing ==
The new knife was manufactured by the Camillus Cutlery Company, with 14,370 knives produced; a relatively small number compared to the 2.5 million M3 fighting knife units issued.

The Marine Raider stiletto blade was "blanked" or stamped out of steel sheet stock. Had a thicker sheet metal gauge been used, it would have been more costly.

In addition, it would have required more steel, a commodity which had to be conserved during the war. The flat knife blank was then machined to the diamond cross section.

By comparison the Fairbairn-Sykes fighting knife was more expensive to make, but stronger. It was drop-forged to shape, a process which strengthens the steel, then hand-ground to final finish.

== Use ==
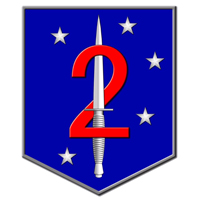
2nd MSOB insignia featuring the stiletto

The knife was designed in 1942 and officially issued on a selective basis to the Marines, with priority to elite units such as the Raiders.

In addition to Raider units, it is known that Scout and Sniper companies of the 1st Marine Division were issued the stiletto, and some members of the 1st Marine Parachute Battalion also acquired them, either by barter and trade, or by unofficial requisition from Quartermaster stores.

The Raider stiletto was also issued to the 1st Marine Raider Battalion commanded by Colonel Merritt A. Edson, the 1st Marine Parachute Battalion, and to Marines in the 2nd Marine Raider Battalion commanded by Lt. Col. Evans F. Carlson.

After their first combat, many of the Marines in the 2nd Raider Battalion exchanged their Raider stilettos for general-purpose short machetes (Spanish: machetes pequeños) and hunting knives.

Among the weapons discovered are usually hunting/utility patterns such as Western States Cutlery Co.'s pre-war L76 and L77 pattern knives, both of which had 7-inch (180 mm) Bowie-type clip blades and leather handles.

The Western States L77 was stocked at the San Diego Base Exchange at the onset of the war, and knives of this pattern were carried by many Marines in the 1st Marine Division as well as by Marine Raiders in the 2nd Marine Raider Battalion commanded by Lt. Col. Evans F. Carlson.

In late 1943 the Raider Stiletto was replaced by the new Marine Corps fighting and utility knife designated 1219C2 (later to become famous as the KA-BAR), a change welcomed by Edson's Marines.

== Reception ==
The Marines of the 1st Raider battalion found the Raider stiletto to be well designed for silent killing, but was of little use for any other purpose, and too frail for general utility tasks.

USMC Major General Oscar F. Peatross, a veteran of the famous Makin Island raid and author of the book, Bless 'em All: The Raider Marines of World War II ISBN 0-9652325-0-6, recalled about the stiletto:

It was pointed out that it should never be thrown, as it was designed as a hand-held weapon to be used only in combat. It was also pointed out that it was brittle and would break even if just dropped, particularly the point.

— M.G. Oscar F. Peatross, USMC retired

The Marine Raiders found they could fit the sheath behind the standard issue M1911 pistol holster by inserting the sheath body between the holster body and belt attachment flap and tying the tip of the sheath and holster together with the tie-down thong. This gave more room on their web belt and made both the pistol and stiletto available to the right hand.

== Variants ==
=== 1st Canadian Parachute Battalion ===
The 1st Canadian Parachute Battalion was issued a variant of the U.S. Marine Raider stiletto.

The stiletto was manufactured by Camillus in the United States and was identical to the Raiders, except it had a parkerized finish.

In addition, the hilt was without the U.S.M.C. scroll and the manufacturer's name was not etched on the blade.

As part of the original production run, approximately 500 parkerized units were manufactured and issued to the Canadian Airborne.

== Collectibility ==
The U.S. Marine Raider stiletto is a collectible knife for a number of reasons. It was one of the first Marine-designed and Marine-issued knives. It was issued to a special unit. Because of the decomposing zinc-alloy handle, the stiletto is one of the rarest knives in the world of militaria collecting and knife collecting, and existing specimens can be expensive.

== See also ==
- Ka-Bar
- List of daggers
- V-42 stiletto
- Marine Raider Museum
