= Billings (surname) =

Billings is a surname.

== People ==
Notable people with the surname include:

- Alan Billings (born 1942), Church of England priest and South Yorkshire's Police Crime Commissioner
- Alexandra Billings (born 1962), American actress
- Amanda Billings (born 1986), Canadian figure skater
- Andrew Billings (born 1995), American football player
- Andrew C. Billings, professor of Journalism and Creative Media
- Bobby Billings (born 1975), American musician, singer and songwriter
- Braddish Billings (1783–1864), early settler in the Ottawa, Canada area
- Brook Billings (born 1980), American indoor volleyball player
- Bruce Billings (disambiguation)
- Charles Billings (disambiguation):
  - Charles Billings (politician) (1825–1906), Canadian politician in Gloucester Township, Ontario
  - Charles E. Billings (1834–1920), American inventor and manufacturer
  - Charles L. Billings (1856–1938), American lawyer and politician
  - Charles W. Billings (1899–1928), American politician and sport shooter
- Dave Billings (born 1953), selector for the Dublin senior football team
- Dick Billings (born 1942), professional baseball player
- Dwight Billings (1910–1997), American ecologist
- Earl Billings (born 1945), American actor
- Edmund Billings (1868–1929), Canadian-born American financier, banker, sociologist, philanthropist, and government official
- Edward Coke Billings (1829–1893), United States District Judge
- Edwin Tryon Billings (1824–1893), American portrait painter
- Elkanah Billings (1820–1876), Canadian palaeontologist
- Eric F. Billings (born 1954), chairman of Arlington Asset Investment
- Florence Billings (1895–?), American silent film actress
- Franklin S. Billings (1862–1935), American politician
- Franklin S. Billings Jr. (1922–2014), US Federal Judge from Woodstock, Vermont
- Frederick H. Billings (1823–1890), American lawyer and financier from Woodstock, Vermont
- G. M. Billings (1890–1969), American football and baseball player and coach and otolaryngologist
- George A. Billings (1870–1934), American actor
- Hammatt Billings (1818–1874), born Charles Howland Hammatt Billings, an artist and architect from Boston, Massachusetts
- Harold Billings (1931–2017), American librarian, editor and author
- Henry Billings (1901–1985), American artist
- Henry Billings Brown (1836–1913), US Supreme Court Justice
- Henry M. Billings (1806–1862), American politician
- Jack Billings (born 1995), Australian rules footballer
- James Billings (1932–2022), American opera singer and director
- Jill Billings (born 1962), American politician
- Joel Billings, American computer game designer
- John Billings (Australian physician) (1918–2007), Australian neurologist
- John Shaw Billings (1838–1913), American librarian and surgeon, first director of the New York Public Library
- Joseph Billings (c.1758–1806), English explorer in the Russian service
- Joseph Edward Billings (died 1880s), American architect
- Josh Billings (1818–1885), the pen name of American humorist Henry Wheeler Shaw
- Josh Billings (catcher) (1892–1981), professional baseball player
- Judith Billings (1943–2025), American judge
- Katharine Fowler-Billings (1902–1997), American naturalist and geologist
- Lem Billings aka Kirk LeMoyne Billings (1916–1981), lifelong close friend of US President John F. Kennedy
- Marland P. Billings (1902–1996), American structural geologist
- Mary Billings French (1869–1951), American heiress and daughter of Frederick H. Billings
- Mary C. Billings (1824–1904; pseudonym, "M.C.G."), American writer, activist, evangelist, missionary
- Phil Billings (born 1939), Australian amateur golfer
- Rhoda Billings (1937–2025), American lawyer and justice of the North Carolina Supreme Court
- Richard N. Billings, American writer and editor
- Robert Billings (1949–1986), Canadian poet and editor
- Robert William Billings (1812–1874), British architect
- Sam Billings (born 1991), English cricketer
- Ted Billings (1880–1947), American character actor
- Titus Billings (1793–1866), early member of the Latter Day Saint movement
- Warren Billings (1893–1972), American labor leader wrongly convicted of a 1916 bombing in San Francisco
- William Billings (1746–1800), early American composer
- William Howard Billings (1921–1991), Associate Justice of the Supreme Court of Missouri

== Fictional characters ==
- Steve Billings, a fictional detective on The Shield

== See also ==
- Justice Billings (disambiguation)
- Billing (surname)
