= Billings (disambiguation) =

Billings is the largest city in the U.S. state of Montana.

Billings may also refer to:

== Places ==
=== United States ===
- Billings, Missouri
- Billings, New York
- Billings, Oklahoma
- Billings, West Virginia
- Billings County, Kansas
- Billings County, North Dakota
- Billings Field, a park located in West Roxbury, Massachusetts, U.S.
- Billings Township, Michigan

=== Elsewhere ===
- Billings, Hesse, Germany
- Billings, Ontario, Canada
- Billings, Russia
- 73703 Billings, a minor planet
- Billings Bridge, a bridge over the Rideau River in Ottawa, Canada, named after Braddish Billings
- Billings Reservoir, a reservoir in São Paulo, Brazil
- Billings Ward, former name of Southgate Ward
- Cape Billings, a headland on the northern coast of Chukotka, Russian Federation

== People with the name ==
- Billings (surname)
- Billings Learned Hand (1872–1961), an American judge

== Historic sites ==
- Billings estate (Manhattan) or Tyrone Hall, a 1903 mansion owned by American industrialist C. K. G. Billings
- Billings-Cole House, an historic house in Malvern, Arkansas, U.S.

== Military ==
- Operation Billings, a search and destroy operation during the Vietnam War
- USS Billings (launched 2017), a 2017 U.S. Navy littoral combat ship

== Other uses ==
- Billings, a business term for sales or revenue
- Billings and Edmonds, an English school uniform supplier
- Billings Computer Corporation, a defunct American computer manufacturer
- Billings ovulation method, a form of natural family planning
- Billings-Burns, English automobile built only in 1900
- Camp Billings, a summer camp in Vermont, U.S.
- Steve Billings, a fictional detective in The Shield

== See also ==
- Billing (disambiguation)
- Billinge (disambiguation)
- Billings Refinery (disambiguation)
- Justice Billings (disambiguation)
- Bill (disambiguation)
- Bil (disambiguation)
