= Charles Billings =

Charles Billings may refer to:

- Charles Billings (politician) (1825–1906), Canadian politician in Gloucester Township, Ontario
- Charles E. Billings (1835–1920), American inventor
- Charles L. Billings (1856–1938), American lawyer and politician
- Charles W. Billings (1866–1928), American Olympic sport shooter
