= School uniforms in England =

Uniform clothing worn by English schoolchildren

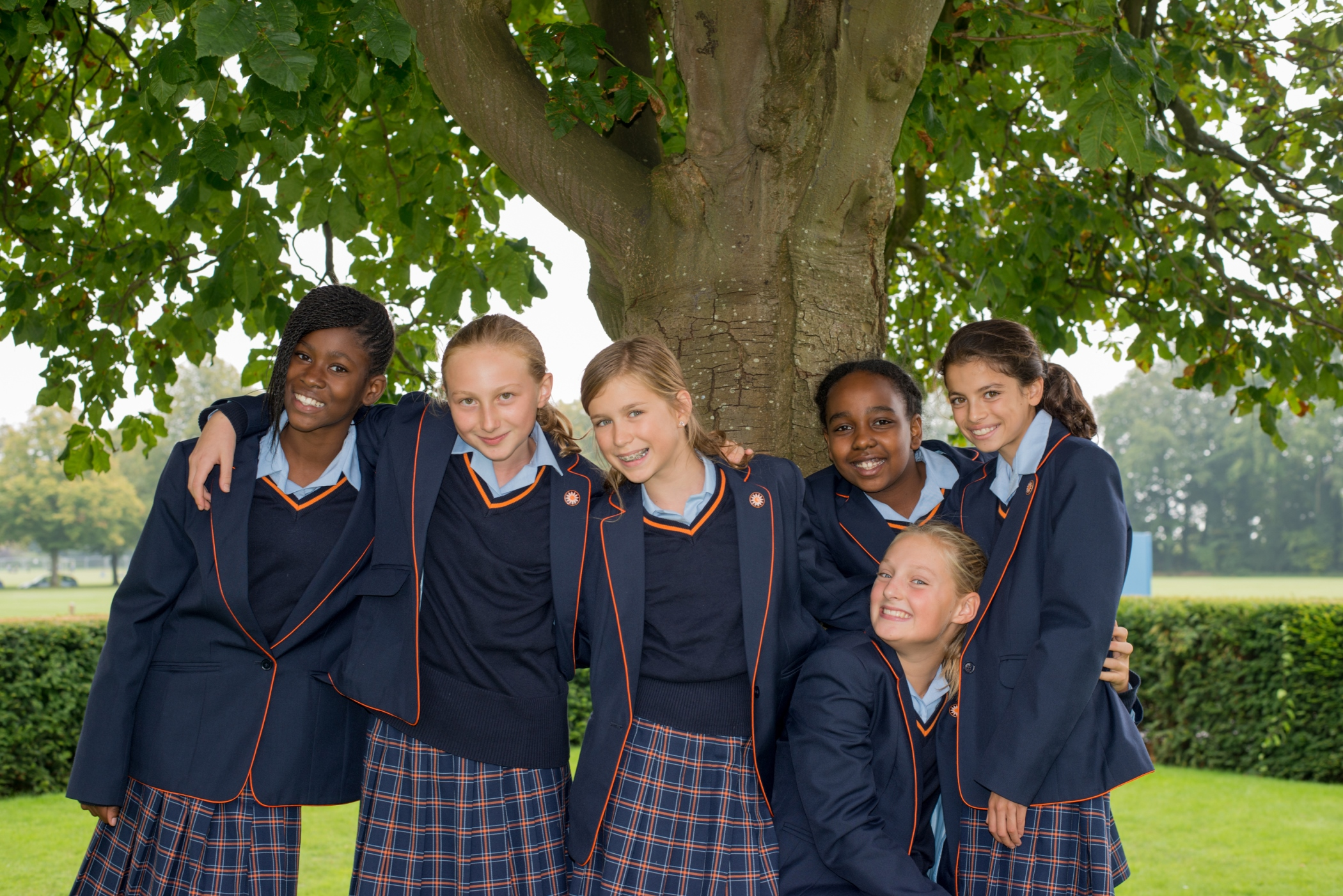
Pupils at St Swithun's School in school uniform.

School uniforms are worn in over 90% of primary and secondary schools in England. Parents are required to purchase the uniform which in 2015 averaged roughly £212.88 per child.

The Department for Education encourages all schools in England to have a uniform; this is so that all students feel part of a community regardless of economic status. The policy also helps to identify students within the school and differentiates students from potential visitors.

== History ==
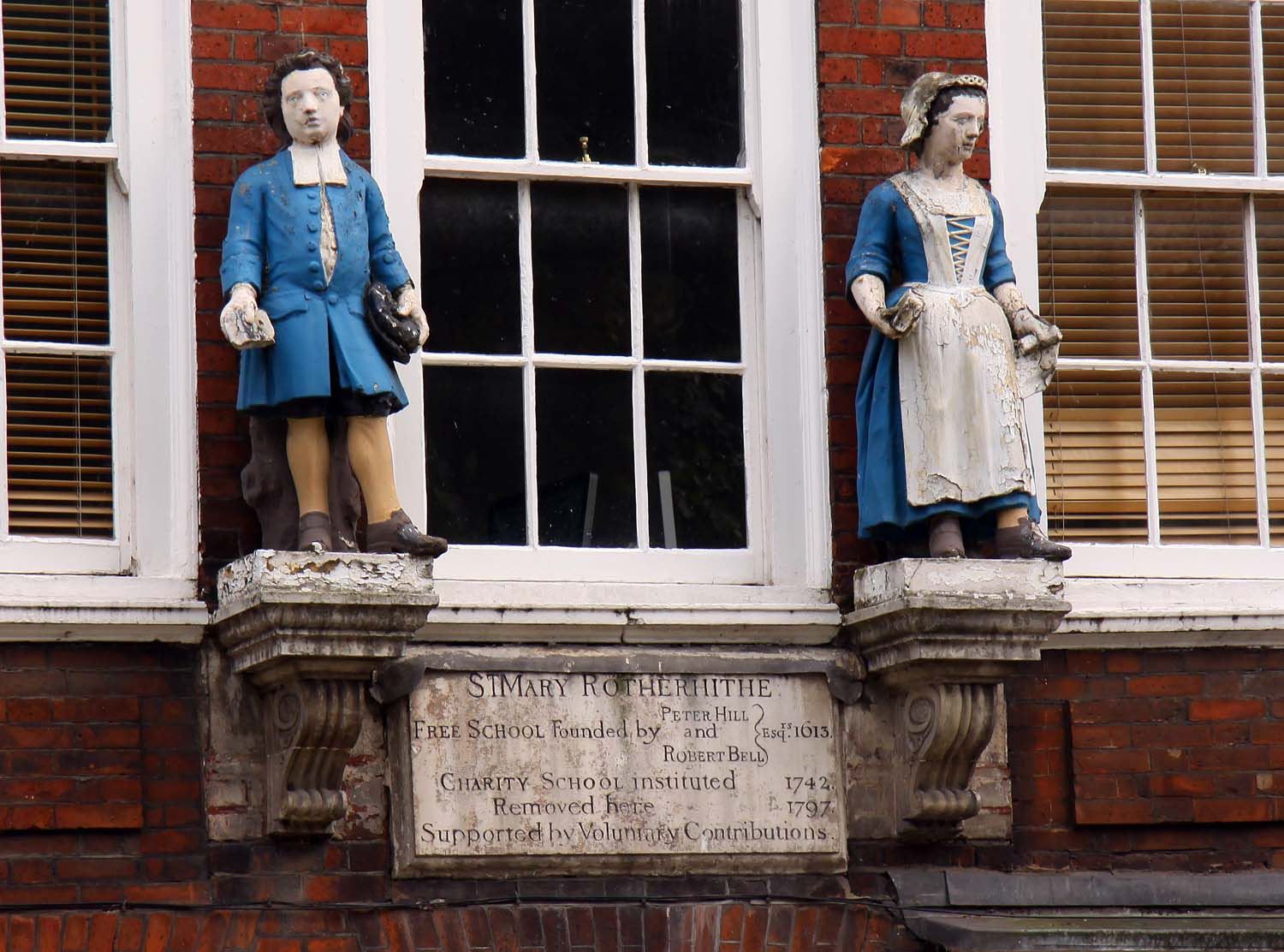
18th century statues depicting boy and girl charity school pupils in Rotherhithe, London.

The first written reference to a uniform for boys was in 1222 when the Archbishop of Canterbury mandated that students wear a robe-like outfit called the "cappa clausa".

In the early 16th century charity school pupils were given second-hand clothes, in 1552 the Christ's Hospital charity issued an obligatory uniform to its scholars. It was designed to emphasise the low status of the children, and was based on the clerical cassock and was russet in colour, but was changed after one year to be blue. Their petticoats were yellow as it was supposed to deter vermin from breeding- these were changed to whites in 1865. Breeches were not worn until 1706; when they were provided for the sick and weakly and later for all.

Other children were not so lucky, village children might get a basic education in reading, writing and reckoning courtesy of their parish church school. Others in the new industrial towns, attended Sunday Schools in addition to working full-time. Stockport Sunday School was the largest, the teachers were in the main volunteers and attendance was voluntary. There was no uniform, children attended in their only clothes.

The appearance of a uniform at most schools was slow to develop, and was rare before the beginning of the 19th century. It was influenced by the appearance of uniforms in civilian professions and trades, the growing sobriety of men's fashions, and the emergence of sportswear.

=== Nineteenth century ===
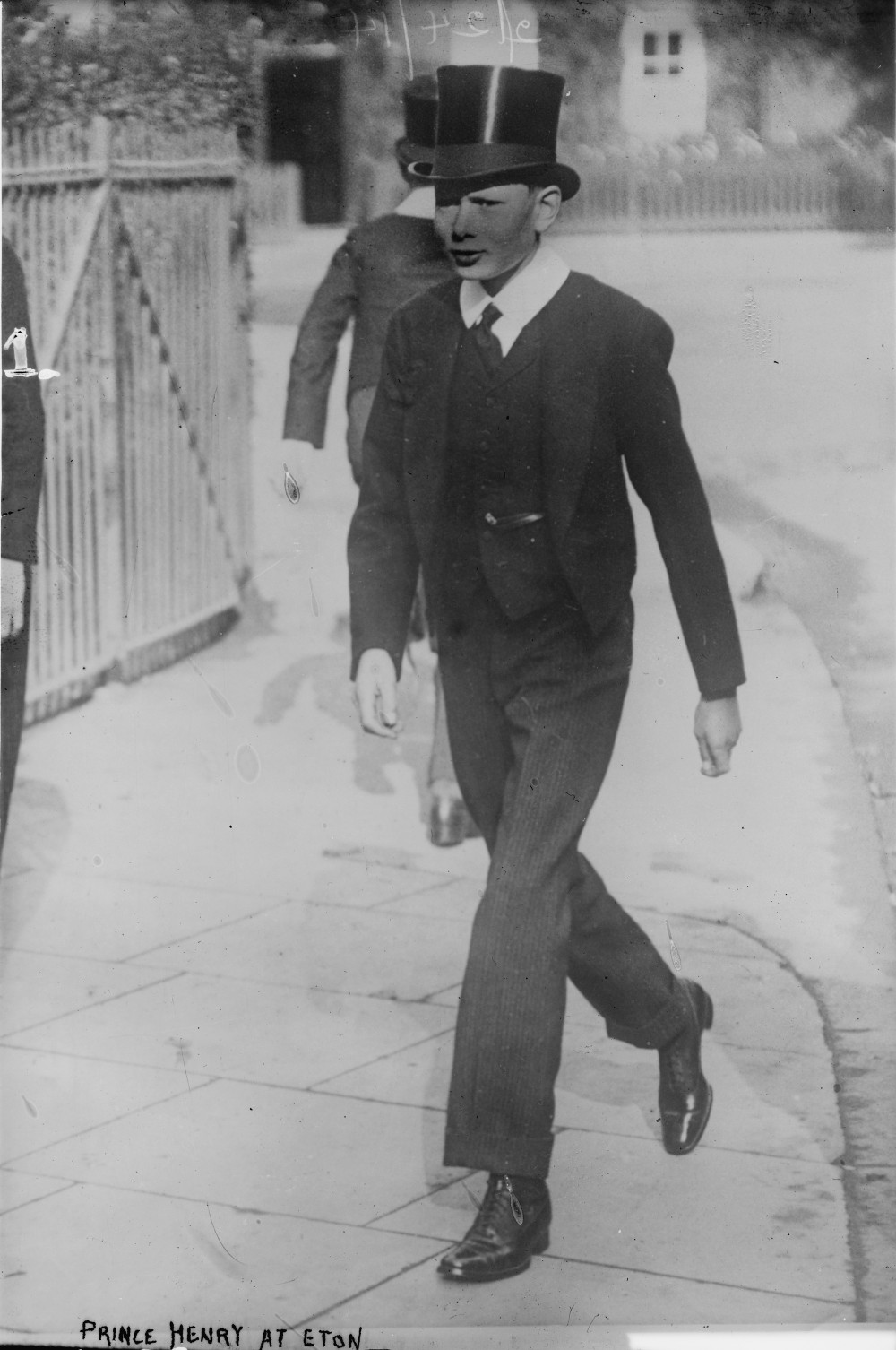
The uniform of Eton College, unchanged since about 1820.

The century opened with the Health and Morals of Apprentices Act 1802 which attempted to ensure children were instructed in reading, writing and religion but it was not effectively policed. Boys continued to wear their own clothes.

Around 1820, the elite public schools formalised their dress code standardising on what upper class children would have already been wearing. Eton introduced the Eton suit for boys under 5 ft 4ins, comprising a short dark ‘bum freezer’ jacket, grey trousers, large starched white collar and top hat. Other public schools had their own interpretations. Town grammar schools followed the trend and many adopted a sober uniform of short jacket and trousers, white Eton collar, bow tie or knotted tie and a round cap as would be worn by cricketers.

In 1870, the Elementary Education Act 1870 (33 & 34 Vict. c. 75) made elementary education available for all children in England and Wales. Grammar school headteachers put their pupils into uniform to distinguish them from pupils at the new school board elementary schools. Younger board school boys generally wore knickerbockers, black woollen stockings, leather boots, white shirts with starched Eton collars and a lounge or Norfolk jacket. The Norfolk jacket with its cloth belt and vertical stitched-down pleats, originated as a sporting garment and had become popular school and weekend wear during the 1880s/1890s,

Throughout the century girls generally did not wear a uniform. As schools started teaching girls team sports, gymnastics and callisthenics a functional kit evolved. Fitted bodices and long skirts were unsuitable for energetic activities and so stretchy jerseys or loose blouses and knee-length skirts or ‘bloomers’ with coloured waist sashes were worn. By the end of the century this practical sportswear became the general school uniform.

=== Twentieth century ===
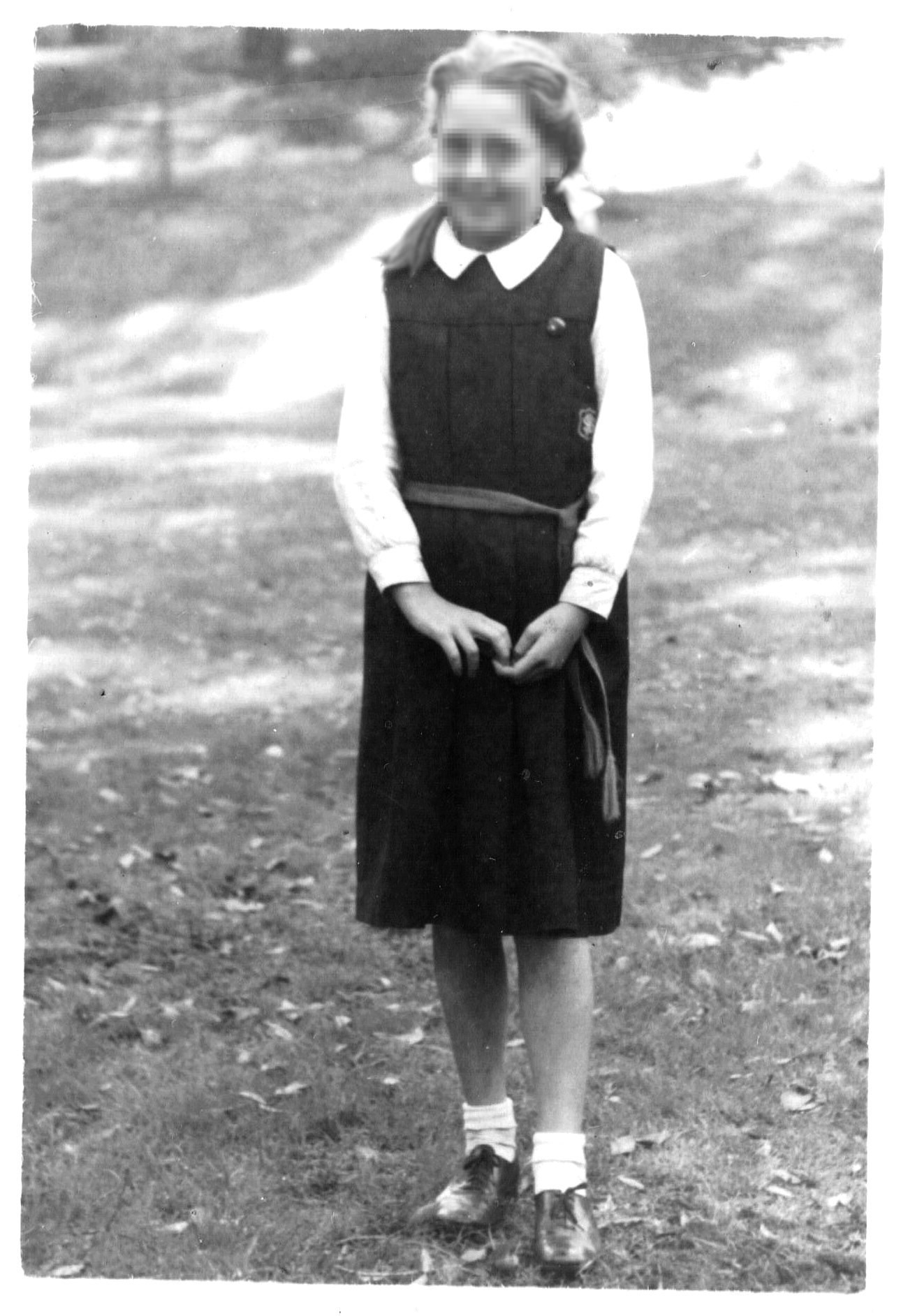
A typical 1950 girls' school uniform.

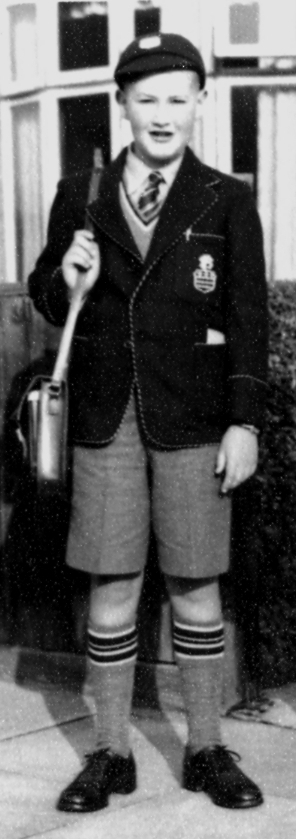
A typical boy's grammar school uniform in 1953, with tie, blazer, cap and short trousers.

Throughout the Edwardian era, in the private and grammar schools the established uniform of knickerbockers, Norfolk or lounge jacket, white shirt with Eton collar and bow tie or knotted tie held sway. Short drawers or ‘shorts’ were worn for team sports and athletics.

After the First World War, the old-fashioned knickerbockers gave way to shorts for younger boys, and black stockings and boots were superseded by socks and shoes. Elementary schools had no formal uniform, younger boys continued to wear comfortable knitted sweaters and flannel shorts. Older boys would wear a uniform of grey flannel shorts, shirt, tie, blazer and cap. Older boys progressed from shorts to long flannel trousers. Most schools set an age or height criterion for the transition to the wearing of ‘longs’. Schools developed distinguishing coloured stripes for blazers, sweaters, ties and caps, and their own unique blazer and cap badge. The 1920s school boy's uniform remained little changed until well into the second half of the twentieth century, after the Butler reforms when secondary education was made free to all, and the school leaving age was raised to 15.

Elementary school girls under 14 wore dresses that followed fashionable lines, the loose calf-length smock-frocks of the 1890s and early 1900s, protected beneath a white or coloured pinafore, became shorter shift-style dresses during the 1920s. By the First World War older schoolgirls typically wore a plain tailored calf-length skirt and often a masculine-style shirt and tie. Many middle-class families were sending their daughters to boarding schools. The early twentieth-century schoolgirl was more confident.

The gymslip was originally worn for gymnastics and sports. It developed into a major element of female school uniform by the 1920s, worn with a blouse and tie: in some schools this arrangement continued into the 1960s. Also identifying knitted cardigans or sweaters, blazers with felt hats or straw boaters trimmed with bands in the school colours were also worn, both public schools and local grammar schools insisting on formal uniforms that conformed to precise specifications. At Kidbrooke School, the first LCC comprehensive school that opened in 1954, started out with a uniform of air force blue with coloured berets that identified the girls house.

By the 1960s two parallel debates on the virtue of school uniform had opened up. Parents at schools with strict formal uniform code were battling the governors to relax the rules and follow the example of A. S. Neil at Summerhill and dispense with it, or at least change it into the comfortable sweatshirt and polo shirt with generic grey trousers.

While parents at schools with a more liberal regime were pressurising the head teacher and governors to introduce and enforce a strict formal uniform to make their children look like grammar school children of the 1950s. This they believed would improve discipline and raise standards.

=== School uniform suppliers ===
Schools issued parents and potential parents with an equipment list, including many school specific designs. They specified which department stores had agreed to be stockists. In the 1920s-1950s, families would travel across the country, to London or Manchester on a specific shopping trip. This was a lucrative business for the stores; whole floors were set aside for boys' school uniform and separately for girls' school uniform, where they hoped that families would then visit other floors and do a major shop in other departments.

Two visits were essential, firstly for the measuring up and then for the fitting. This was an expensive business for the families, the lists set by minor public schools were extensive and the items were not available elsewhere. Names such as John Lewis, Selfridges, Harrods, Lewis's of Liverpool, Daniel Neal, Gooch's of Knightsbridge, Kendals of Deansgate were well known. There were specialist shops such as Plums, Rowes of Bond Street and Billings and Edmonds. The items had to be marked with a Cash's name tapes. Where the private schools led, the grammar schools followed.

From the late 1950s the use of exclusive uniform has been confined to a few garments. There will still be the expensive blazers but they may be worn with Marks and Spencers trousers. The pre-war woollen blazer has been replaced in some schools by one in polyester.

== Sociology of school uniform ==
Parents say that wearing a uniform helps all children to fit into a school. The school uniform manufacturer Trutex commissioned research in 2017 that showed school uniforms stopped bullying.

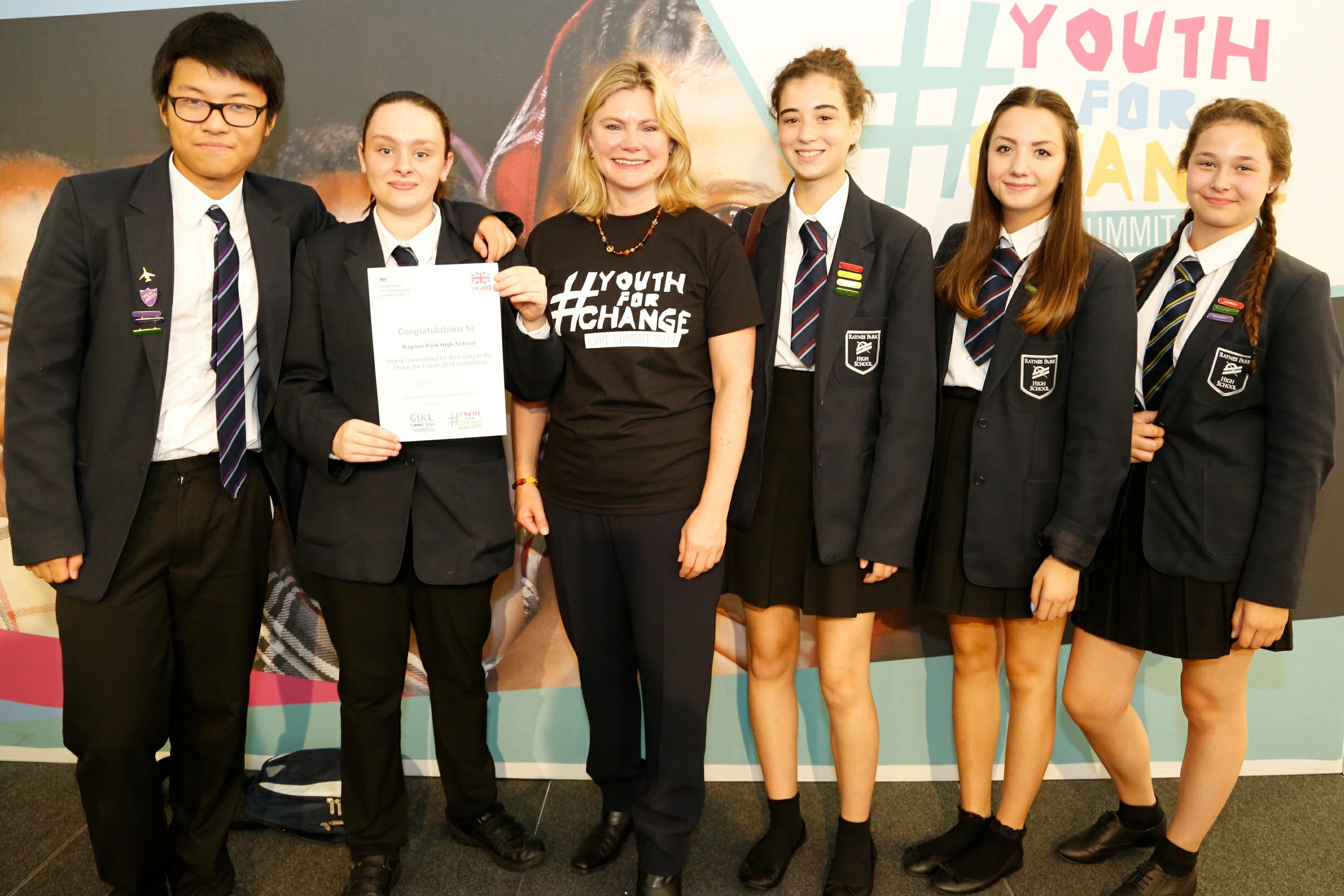
Pupils from Raynes Park High School in school uniform.

However, there is no reliable research showing that uniform improves the academic results of a school. School uniforms act as a form of social control.

Some schools have moved away from school uniform. King Edward VI Community College in Totnes, Devon, abolished it in 2004. The head said in an interview in 2011:

"It was unusual even then to be a state school without a uniform, but we felt we were spending far too much time addressing issues of non-compliance. Too many conversations with students were about tucking shirts in. We were desperate to focus on the important issues of teaching and learning."

They were reintroduced following parental pressure in 2012. In 2019 the head teacher of a Norfolk academy, Marshland High School, wrote to parents to explain the reasons for a uniform change. He stated that they:

"Further strengthen the school ethos, values and expectations, including good school behaviour
Strengthen the students’ sense of belonging to their school and pride in being part of the school community.
Improve equality and reduce inconsistencies
Reduce the need to challenge students over inappropriate dress
Reduce conflict and promote positive relationships, allowing students and teachers to concentrate on teaching and learning"

He had first consulted the parents by letter and in a meeting, The change was rolled out starting with Key Stage 3. The school then bought one set of the uniform for each child, and offered a future subsidy of 75% to the poorer families through the Learning Support Fund: this addressed concern about affordability.

== Politics of school uniform ==
Every time a school is converted into an academy, the trust will often in a rebranding exercise that involves a change in school uniform. The uniforms become more formal.

Uniform is not always popular with students, especially as an inflexible approach can lead to protests. In 2017 during a heat wave, boys at the Isca Academy wore skirts in protest of not being allowed to wear shorts. School skirt length checks by male members of staff at Rainford High School in Merseyside provoked criticism from students and parents, and were a contributing factor to the 2023 United Kingdom pupil protests.

== Cost of school uniforms ==
Some parents have been turning off the heat in their buildings, or going into debt to afford uniforms.

A study in 2007 found that secondary schools were more likely than primary schools to define compulsory items of clothing.

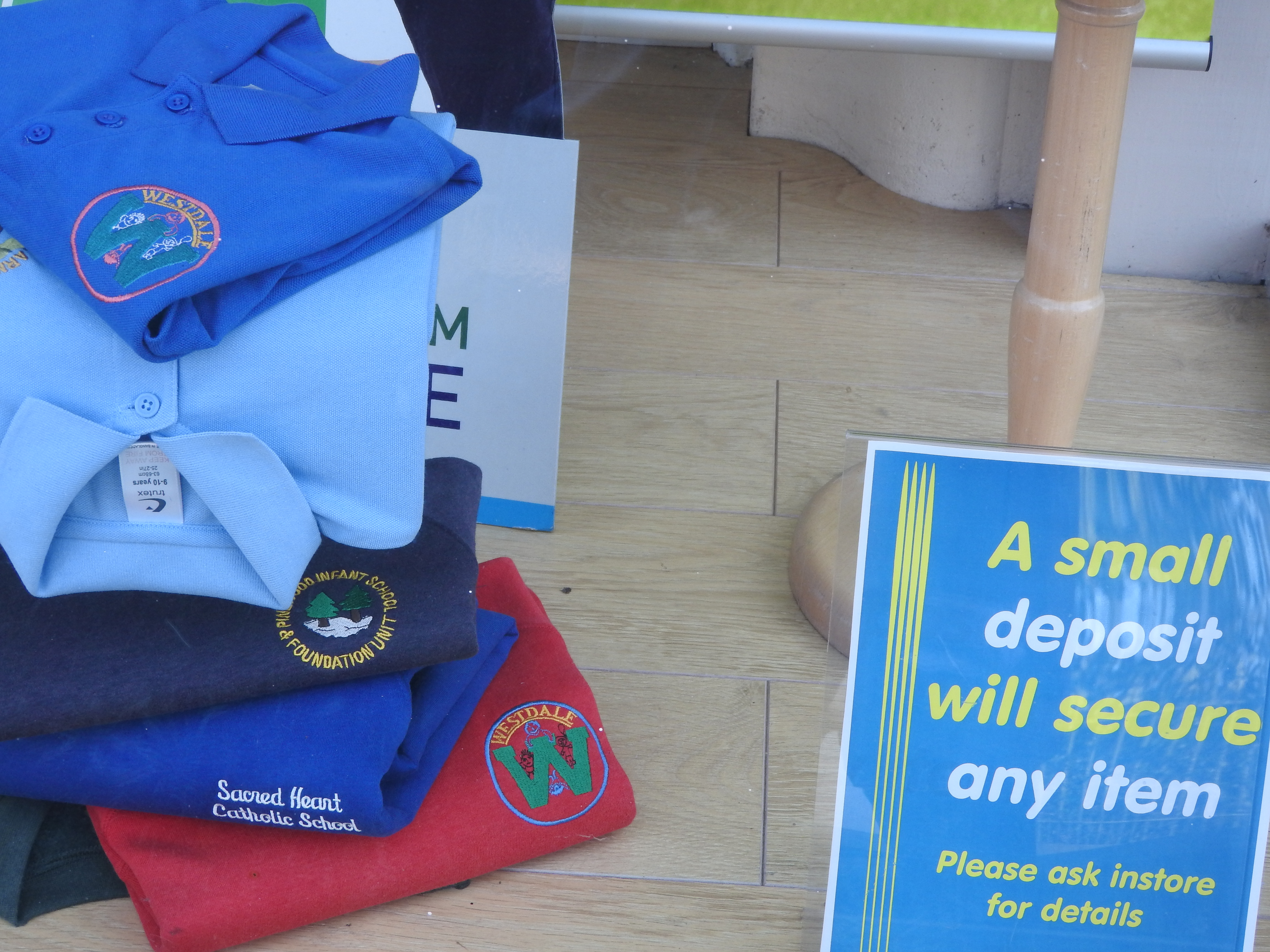
A school uniform shop with various school branding on polo shirts

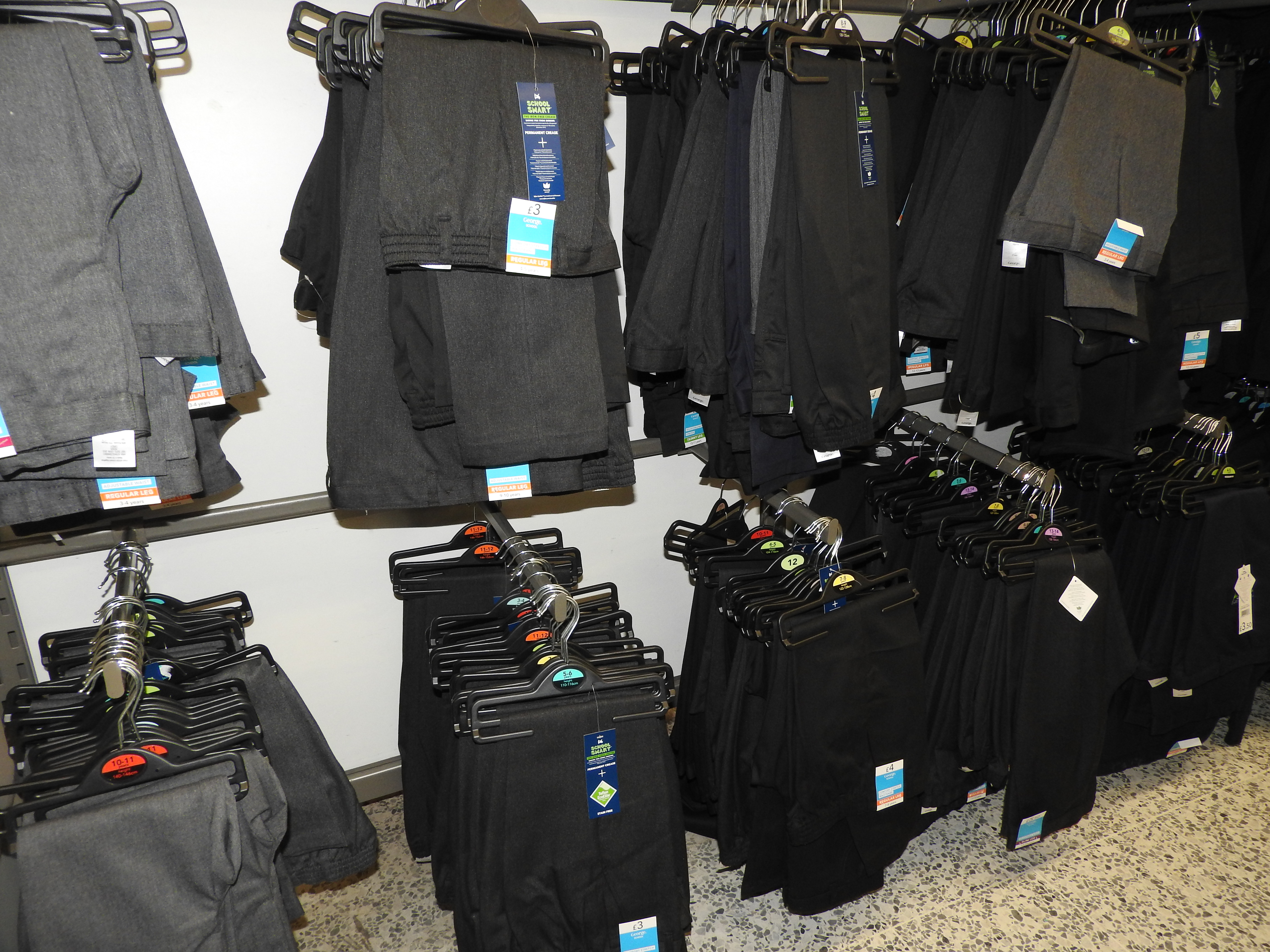
Unbranded school uniform on sale at an Asda supermarket

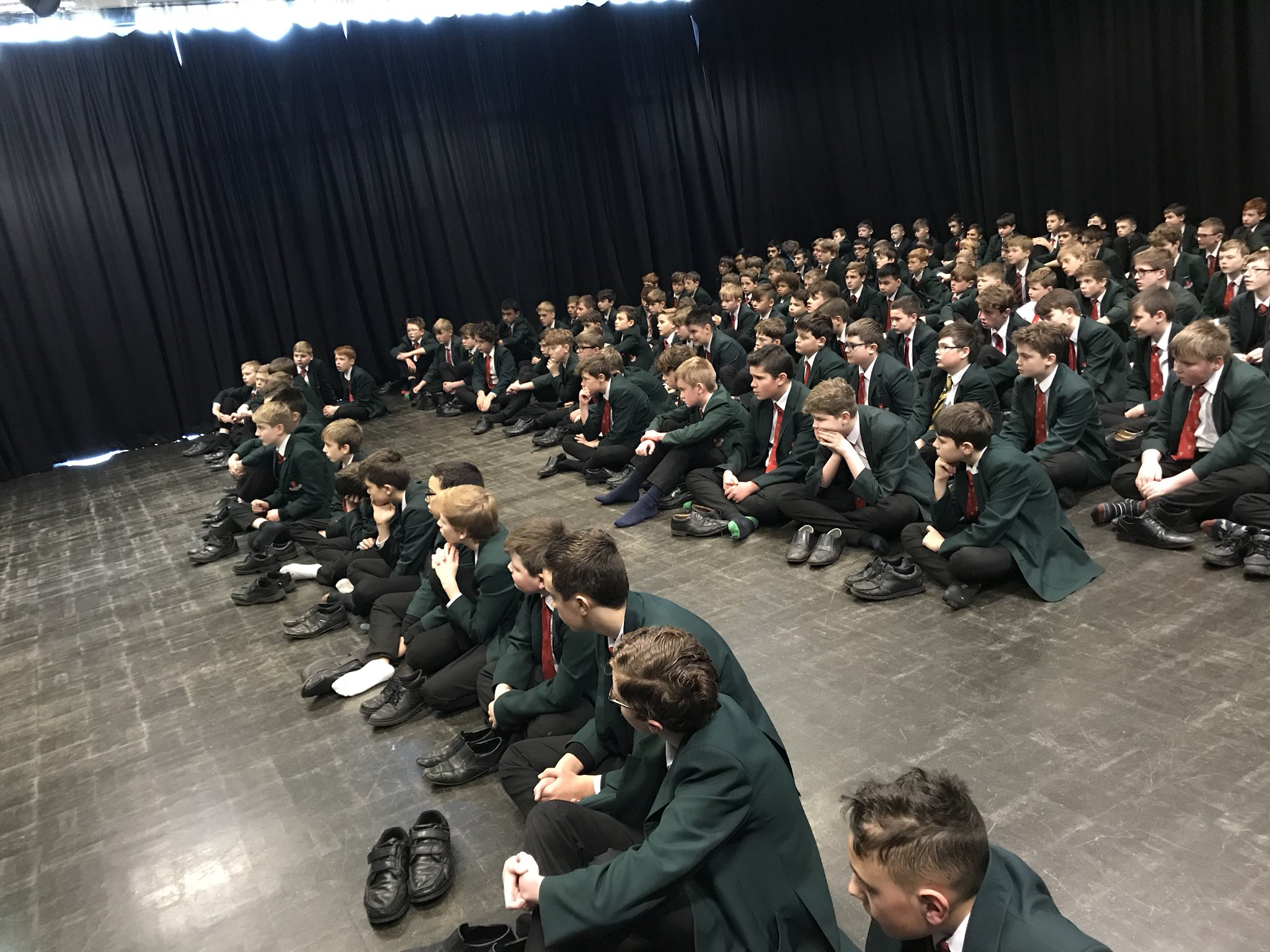
Boys attending Sandbach School in uniform with their school shoes removed

Some primary school uniform items are either optional or not considered part of the school uniform at all. The items which are compulsory in more than one third of primary schools are:

Primary
Garment	Percentage
sweatshirt / fleece	(53 per cent)
trousers	(44 per cent)
shirt/blouse	(39 per cent)
skirt/kilt	(36 per cent)

The number of compulsory uniform items and the proportion of schools requiring them are greater for secondary than for primary schools. Frequently compulsory items are:

Secondary
Garment	Percentage	
Garment	Boys	Girls
shirt / blouse	80	82
skirt / kilt	-	43
trousers	80	39
sweatshirt	36	39
blazer	38	36
specific type of shoes	37	39
tie	(63 per cent)	
school badge	(40 per cent).	

=== Annual costs of school uniform ===
By means of a survey of over 1100 participants, the average cost of each item of 'required' school clothing was calculated. It is displayed to show the effect on the child's age, and whether their school was a maintained school or a self-governing academy (English school).

Table	Average costs of uniform by item, phase and type in 2015			
	Primary		Secondary	
	Academy	Other type	Academy	Other type
Size of sample	(n=173)	(n=280)	(n=423)	(n=287)
Shirt/blouse (Girls only)	£3.84	£4.42	£7.39	£7.38
Shirt (Boys only)	£4.64	£4.92	£5.76	£6.73
Jumper/sweatshirt/cardigan	£10.11	£10.39	£16.67	£16.94
Shoes	£25.15	£26.34	£37.82	£35.34
Trousers	£7.45	£7.06	£13.59	£13.34
Schoolbag	£8.94	£8.96	£20.63	£21.02
Skirt/kilt (Girls only)	£6.92	£6.81	£18.41	£16.41
Shorts (Boys only)	£6.00	£5.22	£9.35	£7.91
Socks	£1.74	£1.54	£1.78	£1.53
Tie	£4.21	£3.61	£5.60	£5.97
Dress/pinafore	£7.47	£7.92	£20.50	£19.00
Blazer	£31.00	£30.00	£34.57	£33.92
Coat	£28.33	£26.94	£38.92	£43.38

All parents/carers where child's school requires uniform (1,183), Source: Survey of parents/carers

As not all these items will be required by each school, and a child will require more of certain items than others, and will grow throughout the year, an attempt has been made to factor in these cost to establish a table of 'total cost of ownership´.

Table	Average total expenditure on individual items of uniform 2015			
Sample (n=1,183)	% needing item	Average unit cost	Average items bought	Average total annual expenditure
Shirt/blouse (Girls only)	99%	£5.65	4.5	£23.66
Shirt (Boys only)	98%	£5.36	5.3	£24.62
Jumper/sweatshirt/cardigan	91%	£12.36	2.5	£28.66
Shoes	96%	£30.19	2.2	£59.13
Trousers	83%	£9.79	2.1	£30.65
Schoolbag	79%	£13.86	1.2	£18.61
Skirt/kilt (Girls only)	80%	£10.59	2.3	£20.83
Shorts (Boys only)	40%	£6.40	1.7	£15.83
Socks	76%	£1.63	9.3	£14.11
Tie	45%	£5.20	1.4	£7.14
Hat	9%	£5.03	1.1	£5.26
Dress/pinafore	19%	£8.44	2.2	£17.45
Blazer	35%	£34.05	1.2	£38.83
Coat	56%	£32.67	1.3	£42.05

All parents/carers where child's school requires uniform (1,183).

A single average figure has little statistical meaning, but taken as a whole this is a large sum of money for many families, and of course is cumulative. Several government departments are monitoring the situation, Social Services from the point of view of large families poverty and the Office for Fair Trading who sees the uniform suppliers and schools operating an unfair monopoly.

=== Prices ===
A comparative survey was done in 2015, and this reveals what it costs to kit up a primary child, and a secondary child with respect to items only available at a named supplier. Though generic items are available from major supermarket chains, the vast majority of schools insist that some items are branded with the schools logo.

Average total expenditure on all school uniform items in 2015 by where uniform is available
item		Total cost
All parents/carers	(n=1,183)	£212.88
All items have to be purchased from designated shop	(n=206)	£237.76
Some items have to be purchased from designated shop and some can be purchased anywhere	(n=734)	£211.73
Some items have to be purchased from designated shop and some have to be purchased from the school	(n=60)	£228.35
All items can be purchased from anywhere	(n=179)	£188.82

All parents/carers where child's school requires uniform (1,183).

=== Sports kit ===
However parents are also obliged to provide sports kit, and the same sorts of issues apply.

item (n=1,134)	students needing item	Average cost per item	Average items bought	Average total expenditure
T-shirts (all year round)	97%	£7.09	1.8	£11.97
Plimsolls/trainers	93%	£19.84	1.4	£28.28
Shorts	89%	£5.75	1.5	£8.82
PE bag	58%	£6.54	0.9	£6.49
Socks	50%	£3.61	3.4	£8.46
Tracksuit bottoms	41%	£10.52	1.2	£12.54
Football/rugby boots (Boys only)	35%	£34.88	1.2	£39.49
Jumper	32%	£12.96	1.2	£15.20
Football/rugby shirt (Boys only)	30%	£18.16	1.1	£17.83
Swimming costume (Girls only)	29%	£11.12	1.1	£11.75
Swimming trunks (Boys only)	26%	£7.52	1.1	£10.82
Tracksuit	25%	£18.52	1.0	£19.04
PE shirt (winter)	19%	£12.05	1.3	£13.63
PE shirt (summer)	18%	£8.45	1.5	£11.69
Skirts (Girls only)	12%	£11.80	1.1	£14.59
Hockey boots (Girls only)	5%	£31.50	0.9	£37.69

All parents/carers where child's school requires PE kit (1,134). Source: Survey of parents/carers

== 2013 Guidance ==
The Department strongly encourages schools to have a uniform as it can play a valuable role in contributing to the ethos of a school and setting an appropriate tone.

It is the governors' right to determine the uniform. The department recommends that governors have a formal uniform policy.

Subsequent to court rulings, governors are obliged to ensure the uniform is affordable. The School Admissions Code 2012, which is statutory guidance, states "Admission authorities must ensure that [...] policies around school uniform or school trips do not discourage parents from applying for a place for their child.” No school uniform should be so expensive as to leave pupils or their families feeling unable to apply to, or attend, a school of their choice, due to the cost of the uniform. School governing bodies should therefore give high priority to cost considerations. The governing body should be able to demonstrate how best value has been achieved and keep the cost of supplying the uniform under review."

"The school uniform should be easily available for parents to purchase and schools should seek to select items that can be purchased cheaply, for example in a supermarket or other good value shop. Schools should keep compulsory branded items to a minimum and avoid specifying expensive items of uniform eg expensive outdoor coats."

"Governing bodies should be able to demonstrate that they have obtained the best value for money from suppliers. Any savings negotiated with suppliers should be passed on to parents wherever possible. Schools should not enter into cash back arrangements. Exclusive single supplier contracts should be avoided unless regular tendering competitions are run where more than one supplier can compete for the contract and where best value for parents is secured."

== See also ==
- Education in England
