= B&S =

B&S may refer to:

- Bachelor and Spinster Balls, parties for rural singles in Australia
- Ball and socket, a type of joint in anatomy and engineering
- Ballybofey and Stranorlar, twin towns in Ireland
- Belle & Sebastian, a Scottish band
- Billings & Spencer, a former manufacturer founded by Charles E. Billings and Christopher Miner Spencer
- Blade and Sorcery, a 2018 virtual reality video game developed by WarpFrog
- Bloomsburg and Sullivan Railroad
- Briggs & Stratton, a large manufacturer of air-cooled gasoline engines
- Bronshtein and Semendyayev, a mathematics book
- Brothers & Sisters (2006 TV series), an American television series
- Brown & Sharpe, a brand of metrological tools and machine tools
- Buffalo and Susquehanna Railroad
- B&S (originally: Blechblas- & Signalinstrumentenfabrik), German musical instrument brand owned by Buffet Crampon
