= Billing (surname) =

Billing is a surname of English, German, and Scandinavian origin that usually derives from a personal name or habitation.

- Amanda Billing (born 1976), New Zealand actress
- Amar Singh Billing (born 1944), Indian cyclist
- Archibald Billing (1791–1881), English physician
- Clara Billing (1881–1963), English artist
- Einar Billing (1871–1939), Swedish theologian
- Eve Billing (1923–2019), UK plant pathologist
- Graham Billing (1936–2001), New Zealand novelist and poet
- Heinz Billing (1914–2017), German physicist and computer scientist
- Hermann Billing (1867–1946), German architect and designer
- Johanna Billing (born 1973), Swedish artist
- John Billing (1816–1863), British architect
- Kevin Billing (born 1944), Australian footballer
- McGregor Billing (1887–1965), South African cricketer
- Noel Pemberton Billing (1881–1948), English politician
- Norman Billing (1913–1989), Australian politician
- Peter Billing (born 1964), English footballer
- Philip Billing (born 1996), Danish footballer
- Robert Billing (died 1898), English Anglican suffragan bishop
- Roy Billing (born 1947), New Zealand television actor
- Thomas Billing (died 1481), Chief Justice of the King's Bench
- Victoria Billing (born 1975), British ambassador

== See also ==
- Billing (disambiguation)
- Billings (surname)
