= Senator Billings =

Senator Billings may refer to:

- Charles L. Billings (1856–1938), Illinois State Senate
- Henry M. Billings (1806–1862), Wisconsin State Senate
- Noyes Billings (1800–1865), Connecticut State Senate
