= Spencer 1882 =

Early American-made pump-action shotgun

- Type: Pump-action shotgun
- Place of origin: United States

Production history
- Designer: Christopher M. Spencer and Sylvester H. Roper
- Designed: Circa April 1882
- Manufacturer: Spencer Arms Company, Francis Bannerman & Sons
- Produced: 1882-1889/1892, 1890-1907; introduced to markets in 1883
- No. built: 20,000 (by Spencer Arms Company before 1892)

Specifications
- Cartridge: 10 gauge, 12 gauge
- Action: Pump-action
- Feed system: 5 or 8 rounds (depending on version) tubular magazine

Spencer 1882 is a pump-action shotgun designed by Christopher Miner Spencer and Sylvester Howard Roper, which was produced by the former's Spencer Arms Company from 1882 to 1889 or 1892, and subsequently by Francis Bannerman & Sons from 1890 to 1907. The design is credited as the first commercially successful pump-action shotgun to be the released to the markets, preceding John Browning's Winchester Model 1893 and Model 1897.

== Development and production history ==
Christopher Miner Spencer had made a name for himself with the Spencer repeating rifle, which would be equipped by Union Soldiers in late stages of the American Civil War. However, his original company - Spencer Repeating Rifle Company - went out of business following the war, mainly due to there being so many military surplus rifles around. In 1868, he declared bankruptcy and his assets were acquired by Oliver Winchester.

Afterwards, he went on to work for Roper Repeating Arms Company in Massachusetts, which too would collapse in 1869. While working at Roper's Arms Company, he would meet Charles E. Billings, who would be instrumental in reviving Spencer's businesses. Initially forming Billings & Spencer, their business produced machine tools, before in 1882, Spencer started his new company - Spencer Arms Company - in Windsor, Connecticut.

Spencer would seek out Roper, the latter who is noted to have discovered shotgun choke. This would lay foundation in the designing of the Spencer 1882. Patented in April 1882, the Spencer 1882 would be introduced to American firearms markets in 1883. Although the Spencer 1882 sold well, the weapon was expensive to manufacture and was not profitable enough to keep Spencer's company afloat.

Spencer's manufacturing would again be in financial trouble and debt, which forced him to sell the shotgun's patents to Francis Bannerman in 1885. According to Leroy Thompson, estimated 20,000 Spencer 1882 shotguns were made before Spencer Arms Company ended their production in 1892.

In 1890, Bannerman would buy out Spencer's company, and under his company - Francis Bannerman & Sons - would continue the manufacture of the Spencer 1882. The guns manufactured under his tenure having the Bannerman name in the side of the gun's action.

In 1893, Winchester would release the Model 1893 pump-action shotgun, designed by John Browning, which would prompt Bannerman to sue Winchester and everyone associated with the Model 1893's designs. However, Winchester cited that they had found pump-action design patents from England, dated prior to 1882, as well as another one from France, which caused the judge to toss out Bannerman's lawsuit.

Winchester's Model 1893 and 1897 began harming the sales of the Spencer 1882, which resulted in Bannerman to cease the production of the Spencer shotgun in 1907.

== Features ==
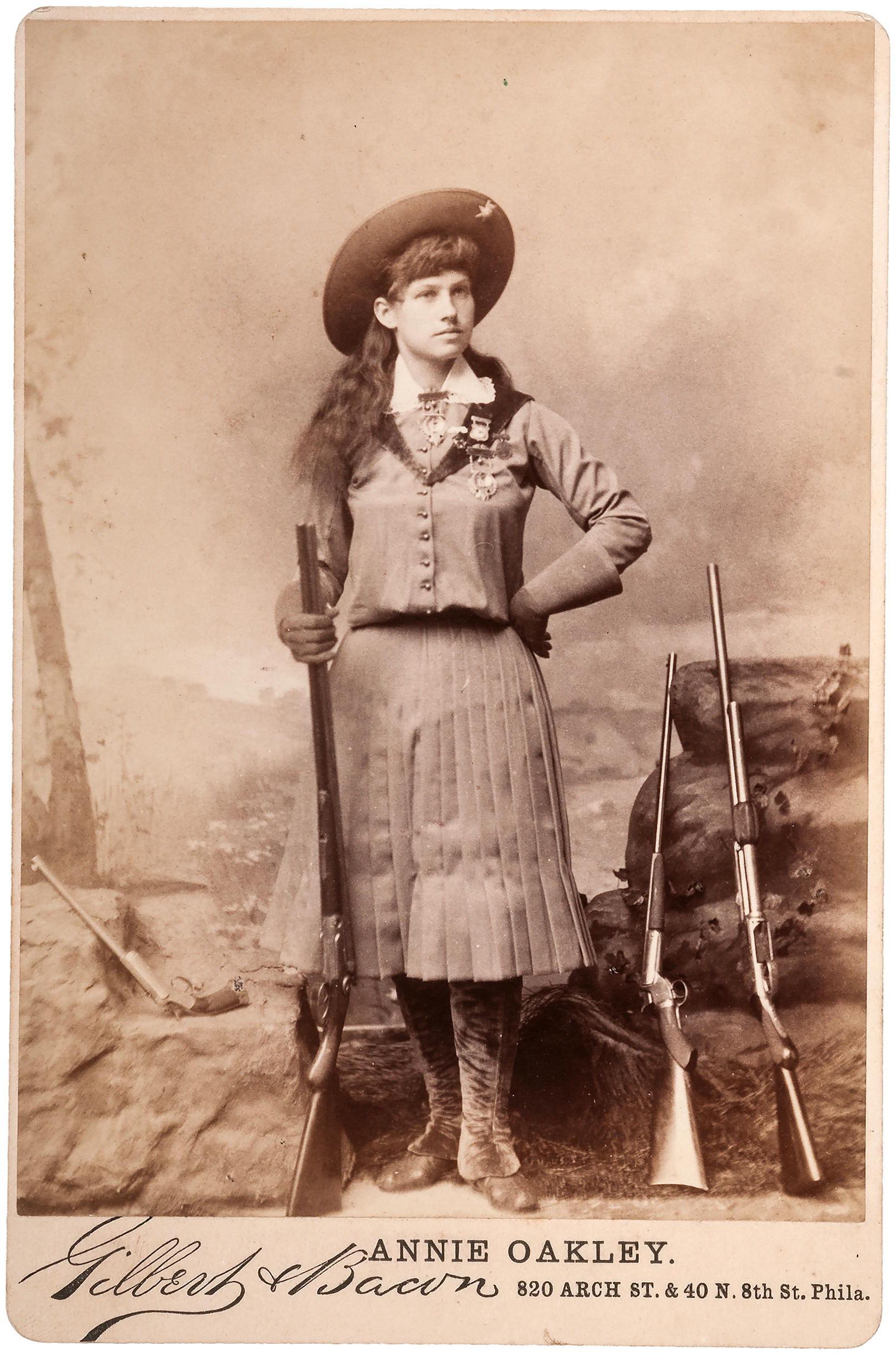
Annie Oakley posing with a single shot Stevens rifle in hand, with the Spencer shotgun being the right of the two guns leaning on the prop rock.

The Spencer 1882 is an early example of pump-action shotgun. It is a hammerless design and uses an unrefined and complex cycling design in which the toggle breech pivots up and down when cycling.

Unlike modern pump-action shotguns, the Spencer 1882 was designed with two triggers. The back trigger is meant for firing, with the second one mounted in front of the former, was meant to re-cock the weapon in case of a cartridge malfunction. The time when Spencer 1882 was manufactured, paper-cased shells and hand-loads were still used, which were inconsistent in terms of reliability.

The Spencer 1882 uses a spring-mounted ejector that's situated in front of the right-side action bar, that catches the dispensed shell and draws it out of the gun from the concave top of the pivoted bolt. In the process, a new shell springs from the magazine into the cutout in the bottom of the toggle. The final rearward pumping makes the breech flap to rotate rapidly again, loading the shell forward and out of the breech top.

Much like modern, conventional pump-action shotgun designs, the Spencer 1882 holds its shells in a tubular magazine beneath the barrel. It is also loaded by pulling the fore-grip back, which will clear the magazine-tube to be loaded. The fore-grip then needs to be cycled to send the shell into the chamber of the shotgun. Depending on the length of the Spencer 1882 variant sold, its magazine capacity is either five or eight 12 gauge shells.

== Reputation and legacy ==
Even though it is regarded as the first successful pump-action shotgun, how it was received by its users during contemporary time remains unclear. According to Leroy Thompson, it was popular enough to be used by unspecified prison services, as well as in very limited combat capacity. Annie Oakley owned a Spencer 1882 shotgun, which was one of her favorite firearms.

From a retrospective view, Spencer 1882 is regarded as a trailblazer for pump-action shotguns. However, modern commentators find the Spencer 1882 to be somewhat awkward to use and/or unpleasant to fire. This is further commented on by Michael McIntosh in his book "Shotguns and Shooting Three", in which he states that: "The Spencer, patented in April 1882 was the first successful [pump-action]; Winchester Model 1897 was the first truly great one."

== See also ==
- List of firearms before the 20th century
