= Billinge =

Billinge may refer to:

== England ==
- Billinge, Merseyside in the Metropolitan Borough of St Helens
- Billinge Higher End in the Metropolitan Borough of Wigan, Greater Manchester
- Billinge and Winstanley Urban District, a former parish and urban district
- Billinge Hill, the county top (highest point) of Merseyside
- Billinge Scar, now demolished 19th century country house near Blackburn, Lancashire.

== Sweden ==
- Billinge, Sweden in Eslöv Municipality, Skåne County

== See also ==
- Billing (disambiguation)
- Billings (disambiguation)
