= Winchester Model 1893 =

Early American-made pump-action shotgun

- Type: Pump-action shotgun
- Place of origin: United States

Production history
- Designer: John and Matthew Browning (prototype); William Mason and Winchester engineers (final production version)
- Designed: c.1890-1893
- Manufacturer: Winchester Repeating Arms Company
- Produced: May 1893-June 1897
- No. built: 34,050
- Variants: Standard, Riot Gun(s), Fancy, Elliot (Trap), Trap Gun, Pigeon

Specifications
- Barrel length: 30 inches (762 mm), 32 inches (813 mm)
- Cartridge: 12 gauge
- Action: Pump-action
- Feed system: 5-round tubular magazine

The Winchester Model 1893, commonly known as Model 93, is an American hammer-action pump-action shotgun designed by John Browning and his brother Matthew, and was produced by the Winchester Repeating Arms Company from May 1893 to June 1897.

It was designed to fire 12 gauge black-powder ammunition and found great success initially. However, its success was hampered by the increasing popularity of smokeless powder shotgun cartridges amongst the American shooters, that the Model 1893 was not designed for. This would lead to the Model 1893 to be redesigned and then supplanted by the Winchester Model 1897, the latter which would become one of the most important shotgun designs in history.

== Development and release ==
Inspired by the success of the Spencer-Bannerman pump-action shotguns, John Browning convinced Thomas Grey Bennett of the Winchester company that there was a market demand for pump-action shotguns. Prior to Model 1893, John Browning had developed the Winchester Model 1887, which was a lever-action shotgun. Indeed, Model 1893 would be Winchester's first non-revolver design to not be a lever-action weapon, being pump-action instead.

In 1890, Winchester purchased the prototype's patents (U.S. Patent No. 441,390) from John Browning and further improved it through the company's in-house engineers led by William Mason. The improved design gave birth to the "Winchester Model 1893" and production began in May 1893. The weapon was introduced to the commercial markets via Winchester's June 1893 trade catalog.

After Winchester Model 1893 had achieved market success, the Winchester company and John Browning were sued by Francis Bannerman over the Model 1893. Bannerman, who owned the rights to Spencer 1882 and had bought out the original Spencer Arms Company, saw the Winchester's shotgun as infringement of patent rights, believing Spencer design to be the earliest pump-action patent. However, when matter was taken to court, Winchester managed to provide various foreign patents pre-dating the Spencer patents, causing the judge to toss out the case.

== Features ==
The Model 1893 is a pump-action shotgun that fires shotgun shells using black powder with a 12 gauge/2 5/8 inch cartridge length. It was designed with an external hammer and an "open" ejector on the top of the receiver, that was relocated to the top on the right side in later models. It uses a 5-round built-in tubular magazine at the bottom of the barrel.

Much like modern pump-action shotguns, the weapon's internals operated with its fore-end. If the shooter pulled fore-grip, it would cause the bolt bolt go back, which in turn pulled the trigger back and cocking it. As the fore-end moved forward, the bolt pushed the cartridge from the tubular under-barrel magazine into the chamber.

When the bolt was pulled back, the gun was locked, and to unlock it, you had to press the firing pin. To unload the gun without firing a shot, you had to press the firing pin, which was not always safe. Model 1893's successor model, the Winchester Model 1897 rectified this design flaw for safe unloading.

The Model 1893 was offered in standard barrel lengths of 30 inches (762 mm) and 32 inches (813 mm). A small number of them are riot-proof versions, that were ordered by the military and police. As was customary at the time, the gun could be equipped with better equipment for extra price. Reportedly, there were a few units made to order with a straight "English-style" stock.

== Reputation and legacy ==
Upon its release, the Model 1893 was met with great commercial success. According to United States Army Ordnance Department, the Winchester Model 1893 had been evaluated by the United States Army prior to 1897, with it reportedly having been found performing "satisfactorily" in the test trials.

In mid-1890s, issues with the design began to emerge, when new smokeless powder ammunition started to become popular, with the Model 1893 having been designed for primarily black powder ammunition in mind. If loaded with smokeless powder ammunition, it would increase the risk of material fatigue and damage the gun itself, likely rendering it unusable in the process. As such, Winchester commissioned the improved version of the Model 1893, that would be able to fire smokeless powder ammunition without trouble, that would eventually become the Winchester Model 1897. Estimated 34,050 units of the Model 1893 were made before the production was discontinued in June 1897.

According to Nathan Gorestein's book, "The Guns of John Moses Browning", redesigning the Model 1893 into Model 1897 was an expensive process, which caused rift between John Browning and Winchester and which then led to the Winchester company rejecting Browning's proposed Auto-5 semi-automatic shotgun design.

According to Leroy Thompson, the Model 1893, along with Model 1897, found use early on "against train, stagecoach, and bank robbers in the American West."

Model 1893's main legacy is being the predecessor to the Model 1897, which would go on to become the first truly widely used pump-action shotgun design. From a retrospective point of view, the Model 1893 is often unfavorably compared with the Model 1897. According to Roy F. Dunlap's 1950 book "Gunsmithing", the Model 1893 was already a rare weapon in the turn of the 1950s, with there being few "in existence or at least in use". He also notes that original parts were extremely difficult to acquire anymore, and only limited few of the Model 1897's parts could be used as replacements.
