= Winchester Model 1897 =

Pump-action shotgun

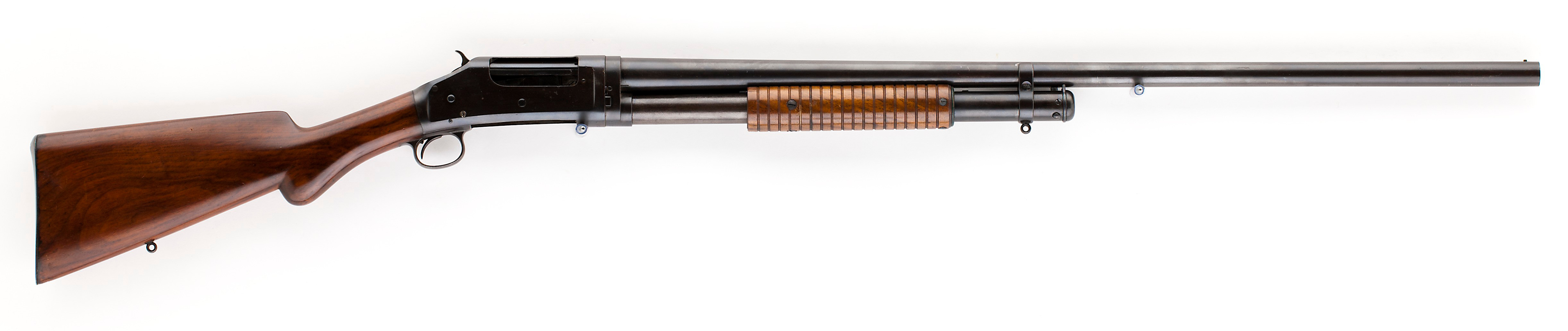
- Type: Pump-action combat shotgun
- Place of origin: United States

Service history
- In service: 1897–present
- Used by: See Users
- Wars: Spanish-American War; Philippine–American War; Banana Wars; Mexican–American Border War; World War I; Irish War of Independence; World War II; Intercommunal violence in Mandatory Palestine (limited); 1947-1949 Palestine war (limited); Korean War; Vietnam War

Production history
- Designer: John Browning, Matthew Browning (Note: In that they designed the original prototype, which was bought by Winchester. The final production version of Model 1897 and its predecessor were further redesigned by Winchester's in-house engineers.)
- Manufacturer: Winchester Repeating Arms Company; Norinco; Cimarron Firearms
- Produced: 1897–1957
- No. built: 1,024,700

Specifications
- Mass: 8 lb (3.6 kg)
- Length: 39.25 in (997 mm)
- Barrel length: 20 in (510 mm)
- Caliber: 12 gauge, 16 gauge
- Action: Pump-action
- Feed system: 5 rounds tubular magazine +1 in battery (total 6 rounds)

The Winchester Model 1897, also known as the Model 97, M97, Riot Gun, or Trench Gun, is a pump-action shotgun with an external hammer and tube magazine manufactured by the Winchester Repeating Arms Company. The Model 1897 was an evolution of the Winchester Model 1893 designed by John Browning. From 1897 until 1957, over one million of these shotguns were produced. The Model 1897 was offered in numerous barrel lengths and grades, chambered in 12 and 16 gauge, and as a solid frame or takedown. The 16-gauge guns had a standard barrel length of 28 in (71 cm), while 12-gauge guns were furnished with 30 in (76 cm) barrels. Special length barrels could be ordered in lengths as short as 20 in (51 cm) or as long as 36 in (91 cm). Since the time the Model 1897 was first manufactured, it has been used to great effect by American military personnel, law enforcement officers, and hunters.

== History ==
The Winchester Model 1897 was designed by American firearms inventor John Moses Browning. The Model 1897 was first listed for sale in the November 1897 Winchester catalog as a 12 gauge solid frame. The 12 gauge takedown model was added in October 1898, and the 16 gauge takedown model in February 1900. Originally produced as a tougher, stronger and more improved version of the Winchester Model 1893, itself an improvement on the early Spencer 1882 pump-action shotgun, the 1897 was identical to its forerunner, except that the receiver was thicker and allowed for use of smokeless powder shells, which were not common at the time. The 1897 introduced a "take down" design, where the barrel and magazine tube could easily be separated from the receiver for cleaning or transportation, the ease of removal of the barrel becoming a standard in pump shotguns made today, like the Remington 870 and Mossberg 500 series. Over time, "the model 97 became the most popular shotgun on the American market and established a standard of performance by which other kinds and makes of shotguns were judged, including the most expensive imported articles". The Winchester Model 1897 was in production from 1897 until 1957. It was in this time frame that the "modern" hammerless designs became common, like the Winchester Model 1912, the Ithaca Model 1937, and the Remington 870. The Model 1897 was superseded by the Winchester Model 1912. However, the gun can still be found today in regular use.

=== Improvements from the 1893 ===
While designing the new Model 1897, many of the weaknesses present in the earlier Model 1893 were taken into account and remedied. These improvements included:

- The frame was strengthened and made longer to handle the newer smokeless powder 12 gauge 2 3/4 inch shell, as well as the older and shorter black powder 2 5/8 inch shell.
- The top of the frame was covered so that the ejection of the fired shell was entirely from the side. This added a lot of strength to the frame of the gun and it allowed the use of a 2 3/4 inch shell without the danger of the gun constantly jamming.
- The action could not be opened until a slight forward movement of the slide handle released the action slide lock. In firing, the recoil of the shotgun gave a slight forward motion to the slide handle and released the action slide lock which enabled the immediate opening of the action. In the absence of any recoil, the slide handle had to be pushed forward manually in order to release the action slide lock.
- A movable cartridge guide was placed on the right side of the carrier block to prevent the escape of the shell when the shotgun was turned sideways in the act of loading.
- The stock was made longer and with less drop.

Of these improvements, the slide lock is the one that made the Model 1897 into a safe firearm. This improved slide lock kept the shotgun locked until actual firing occurred which prevented it from jamming in the case of a misfire. The slide lock "stands in such a relation to the body of the firing pin as will prevent the firing pin reaching the primer until the pin has moved forward a sufficient distance to insure locking of the breech bolt". This prevents the action sleeve "from being retracted by the hand of the gunner until after firing, and hence rendering the firearm more safe".

== Description ==
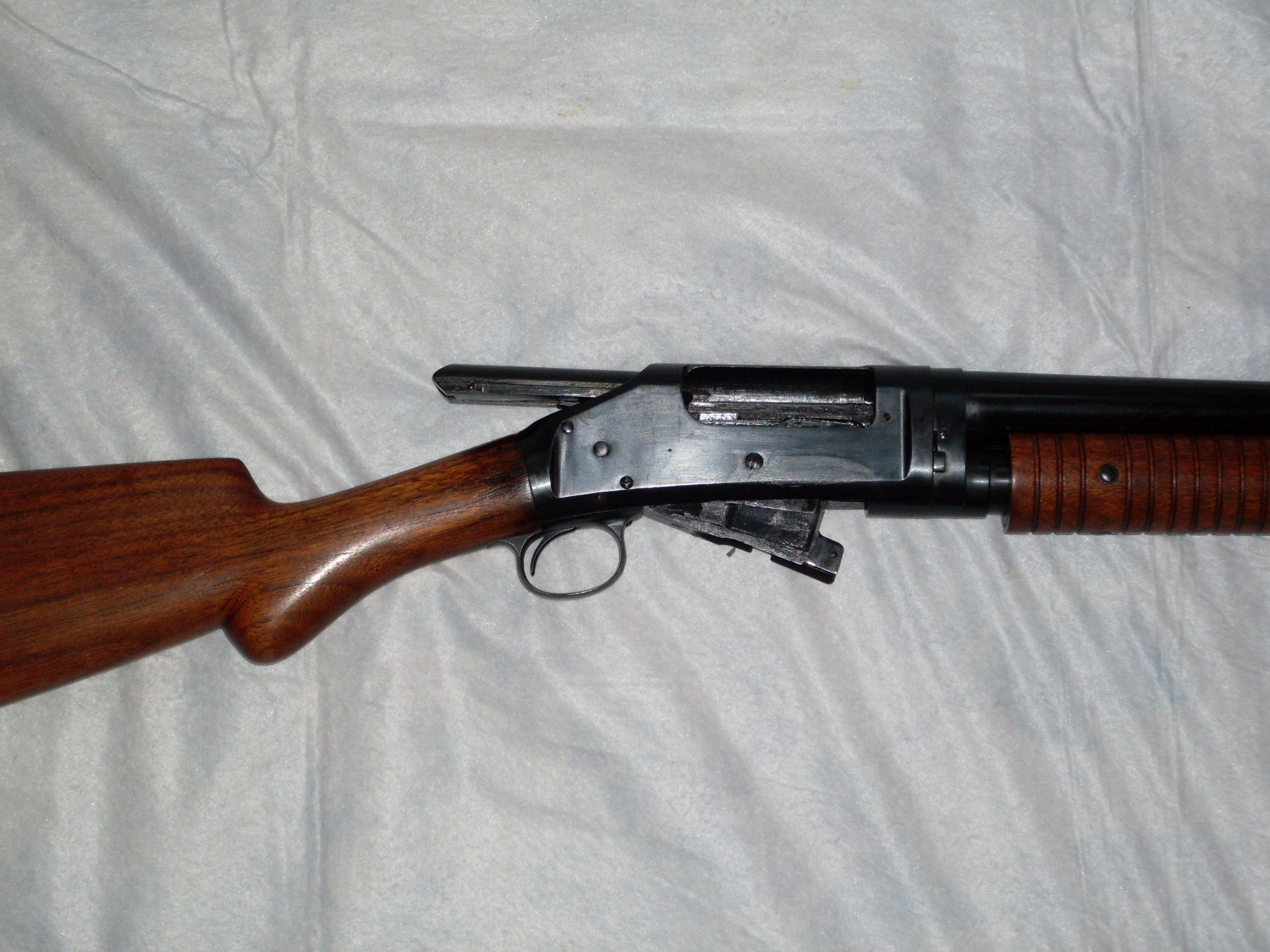
Open action on an 1897 portraying the long slide that projects from the receiver.

The Winchester Model 1897 and the Winchester Model 1893 were both designed by John Browning. The Model 1897 is an external hammer shotgun that is lacking a trigger disconnector. This means that the user can hold the trigger down while cycling the shotgun and once the action is returned to battery the shotgun fires. The firearm itself is classified as a slide action pump shotgun. It was the first truly successful pump-action shotgun produced. Throughout the time period the Model 1897 was in production, over a million of the type were produced in various grades and barrel lengths. 16-gauge guns had a standard barrel length of 28 in (71 cm), while 12-gauge guns were furnished with 30 in (76 cm) length barrels. Special length barrels could be ordered in lengths as short as 20 in (51 cm), and as long as 36 in (91 cm). Along with various grades and barrel lengths, the Model 1897 came in two different chamberings. One was the 12 gauge and the other was the 16 gauge. The shells should be of the 2 5/8 inch or 2 3/4 inch models. Any shells larger are not recommended. An average Model 1897 can hold 5 or 6 shotgun shells in the magazine tube. When working the action of the Model 1897 the forend (fore grip) is pulled back, forcing the breech bolt to the rear which extracts and then ejects the spent shell while simultaneously cocking the external hammer by pushing it to the rear. When the forend is slid forward again, the breech bolt pushes a fresh shell into the gun's chamber and locks into place.

The Chinese company Norinco has made an effort to reproduce this firearm. The Norinco 97 is an almost exact copy of the Winchester 1897, produced in both Trench and Riot grades, yet lacking in the fit and finish of the originals.

=== Grades of the Model 97 ===
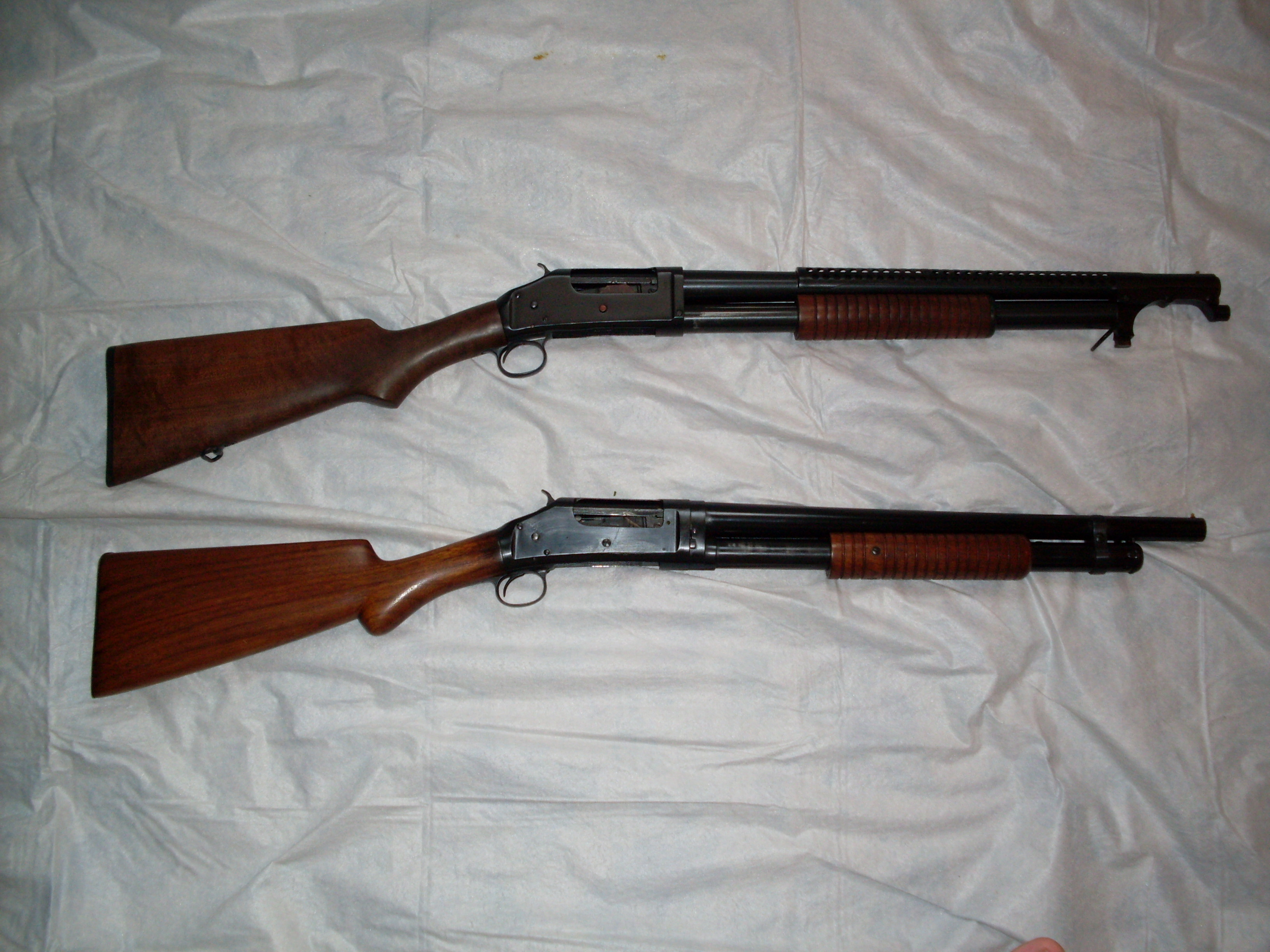
Model 1897 (trench grade) and the reproduced Norinco (riot grade)

Grades of the Model 1897
Grade	Gauge	Barrel (inches)	Production dates	Remarks
Standard	12,16	30 in (76 cm), 28 in (71 cm)	1897–1957	Plain walnut stock with steel buttplate
Trap	12,16	30 in (76 cm), 28 in (71 cm)	1897–1931	Fancy walnut with checkering
Pigeon	12,16	28 in (71 cm)	1897–1939	Same as Trap, but hand-engraved receiver
Tournament	12	30 in (76 cm)	1910–1931	Select walnut; receiver top matte to reduce glare
Brush	12,16	26 in (66 cm)	1897–1931	Shorter magazine, plain walnut without checkering, solid frame
Brush Takedown	12,16	26 in (66 cm)	1897–1931	Same as above, but with takedown frame
Riot	12	20 in (51 cm)	1898–1935	Plain walnut, solid or with takedown frame
Trench	12	20 in (51 cm)	1917–1945	Same as riot gun but with heat shield, bayonet lug, and sling swivels

=== Original prices ===
When the Model 1897 was first introduced, the price depended upon what grade was being purchased and what features were being added to that specific shotgun. To purchase a plain finished shotgun would cost the buyer $25 (equivalent to $968 in 2025), whereas an engraved receiver with checkered and finer wood included cost $100 (equivalent to $3,870 in 2025). The more expensive grades of the Model 1897 were the standard, trap, pigeon, and tournament grades. These were the grades that were normally equipped with an engraved receiver and with checkered, finer wood. The less expensive and plainer grades were the Brush, Brush Takedown, Riot, and Trench. These grades were not given the higher valued wood or special designs. This is because these guns were designed and built for hard abuse. These grades stood a higher chance of being badly damaged so there was no need to put extra money into them for appearance purposes. As the functions that were performed with these grades required them to be lightweight, it was not beneficial to use heavy and expensive wood when designing them. Most often, when these grades were purchased, they were purchased in high numbers. By designing these grades with standard wood and finish, it kept the prices at a lower level. They were also sold in German catalogues for prices comparable to luxury double-barreled shotguns.

== Military use ==
Winchester Model 1897 trench gun

The Model 1897 was issued to American soldiers during the Philippine–American War of 1899. This first major use of issued shotguns by the United States military involved 200 weapons procured and sent to the Philippines in 1900. They were employed in countering Moro tribesmen who engaged the Americans in close-quarter combat using knives and swords. (See: juramentado)

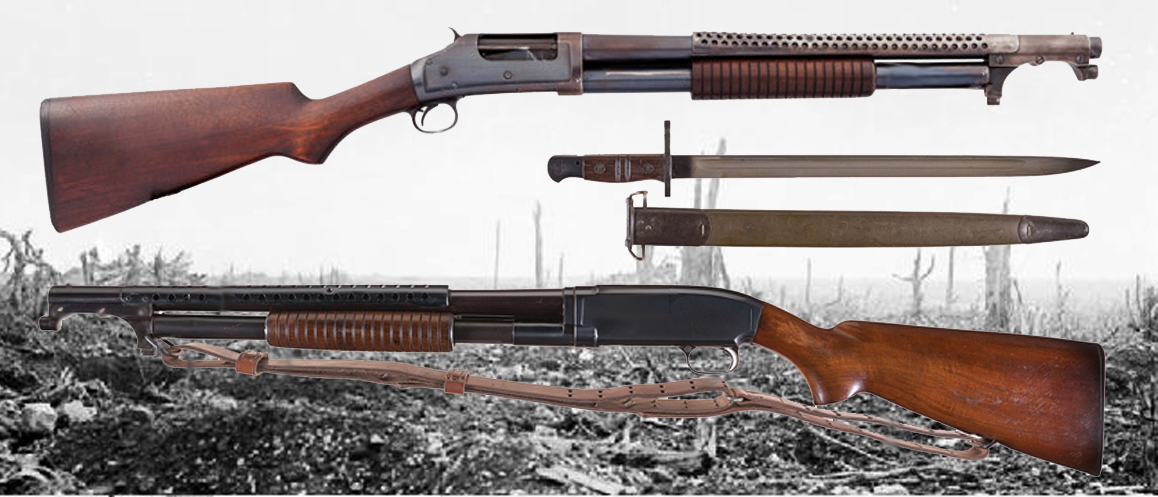
Winchester M97 and M12 trench guns

During the punitive expedition in Mexico, some US soldiers were also equipped with M97s. When the United States entered World War I, there was a need for more service weapons to be issued to the troops. It became clear to the United States just how brutal trench warfare was, and how great the need was for a large amount of close-range firepower while fighting in a trench, after they had observed the war for the first three years. The Model 1897 Trench grade was an evolution of this idea. The pre-existing Winchester Model 1897 was modified by adding a perforated steel heat shield over the barrel which kept the soldier's hands off a hot barrel, and an adapter with bayonet lug for affixing an M1917 bayonet.

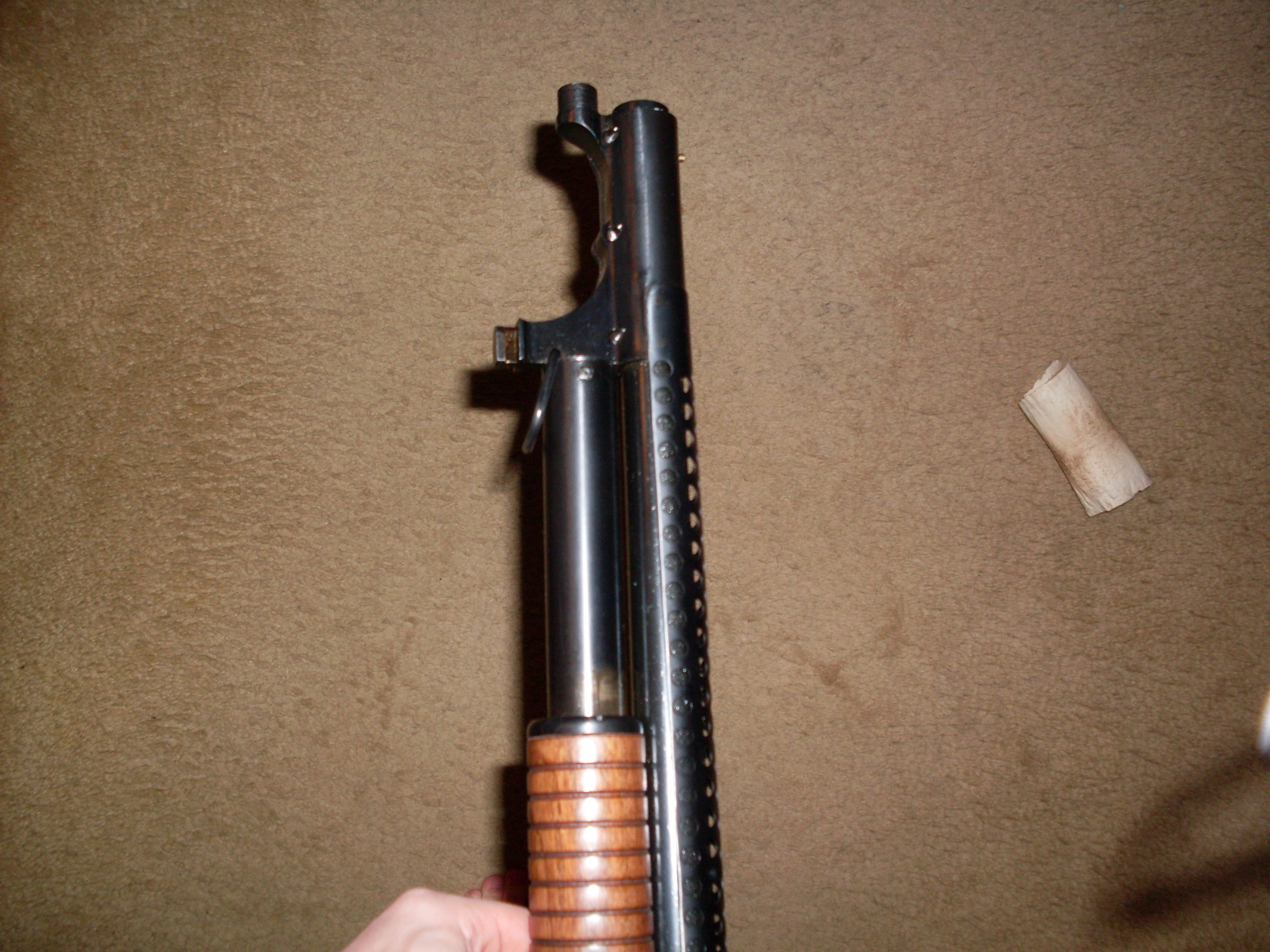
Model 1897 adapter that allowed the attachment of the M1917 bayonet

This model was ideal for close combat and was efficient in trench warfare due to its 20-inch cylinder bore barrel. Buckshot ammunition was issued with the trench grade during the war. Each round of this ammunition contained nine 00 (.33-caliber) buckshot pellets. This gave considerable firepower to the individual soldier by each round that was fired.

It has been said that American soldiers who were skilled at trap shooting were armed with these guns and stationed where they could fire at enemy hand grenades in midair.

Unlike most modern pump-action shotguns, the Winchester Model 1897 (versions of which were type classified as the Model 97 or M97 for short) fired each time the action closed with the trigger depressed (that is, it lacks a trigger disconnector). Coupled with its five-shot capacity, this characteristic allowed troops to fire the whole magazine with great speed by simply keeping the trigger held and running the action as quickly as possible, known as "slam-firing". This made it extremely effective in close combat, such that troops referred to it as the "trench-sweeper" or "trench broom". Shortly before the end of the war, the German government protested the use of shotguns in combat, claiming it to cause unnecessary suffering. The Model 1897 was used again in World War II by the United States Army and Marine Corps, where it was used alongside the similarly militarized version of the hammerless Model 1912. Some were still in service during the Korean War and the Vietnam War.

As combat use of the Model 1897 Shotgun continued during the United States' involvement near the end of World War I, along with the updated Model 1912 and various Remington Models, such as the Remington Model 10, soldiers commonly reported that the paper shells issued to them would break or swell up in the harsh, damp conditions of the trenches. Soldiers demanded brass casings which were impervious to the issues that paper shells frequently ran into. But the government answered to not provide them, as they were substantially more expensive to produce. Even though brass cases would be allegedly issued in small numbers near the end of the war, it would be World War II that would see them mass-produced, before being largely phased out by plastic shells near the end of the 20th century, which filled the same reliability purpose for a fraction of the cost.

=== World War I protests ===
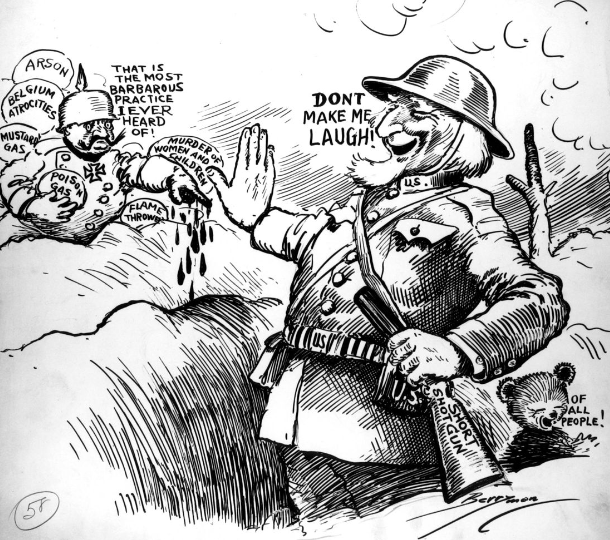
American caricature showing Paul von Hindenburg criticising the short-barrelled shotgun, which Uncle Sam and Teddy mock him for considering German war crimes.

The Winchester Model 1897 shotgun was widely used by American forces during World War I, particularly in trench warfare. Its effectiveness in close-quarters combat led to a formal protest by the German government on 19 September 1918. Germany claimed that the use of shotguns violated the laws of war, specifically citing Article 23(e) of the 1907 Hague Convention, which prohibits weapons causing unnecessary suffering. The protest threatened that any U.S. soldier captured with a shotgun or its ammunition would be subject to execution. In response, the U.S. government, through Secretary of State Robert Lansing and Acting Judge Advocate General Brigadier General Samuel T. Ansell, rejected the German protest. They argued that the shotgun was a lawful weapon of war, comparable to other accepted weapons like shrapnel shells and machine guns. The U.S. warned that any execution of American prisoners would result in reprisals.

Despite the controversy, there are no known instances of German forces executing American soldiers for possessing shotguns. However, the U.S. military reportedly censored photographs of trench guns in combat to avoid further diplomatic issues and to prevent negative perceptions among Allied nations.

During the First World War, both the French and British high commands evaluated shotguns for trench warfare but declined to adopt them, chiefly because ammunition performance was unreliable in damp conditions and reload rates were slower than those of rifles.

== Other uses ==
After the war, a shorter-barrelled version of the Model 1897 was marketed by Winchester as a riot gun. Messengers of The American Express Company were armed with this weapon as were various police departments throughout the US. The differences between this riot version and the trench version were that the riot version lacked the heat shield and bayonet lug, and all trench guns were equipped with sling swivels, whereas most riot guns were not.

== Users ==
- Canada: Used by Royal Canadian Navy Beach Commandos, and other RCN boarding parties in WWII.
- Iran
- Ireland: 698 reported in service in late 1940.
- Philippines
- South Korea: Used by UDT/SEAL.
- United States:
  - US Armed Forces
  - Texas Rangers
  - Detroit Police Department
  - Illinois State Police
  - U.S. Border Patrol
- United Kingdom: Used by the Royal Irish Constabulary.

== See also ==
- List of individual weapons of the U.S. Armed Forces
- List of shotguns

== General and cited references ==
- Boorman, Dean K. (2001). History of Winchester Firearms. The Lyons Press. ISBN 978-1-58574-307-0.
- Carmichel, Jim (1986). Guns and Shooting, 1986. Times Mirror Magazines, Incorporated, Book Division. pp. 78–79. ISBN 978-0-943822-58-7.
- Lewis, Jack; Campbell, Robert K.; Steele, David (2007). The Gun Digest Book of Assault Weapons (7th ed.). Krause Publications. p. 162. ISBN 9780896894983.
- Hager, Michael C (25 January 2005a), "A Timeline History of Winchester", The Winchester Collector, Winchester Arms Collectors Association, archived from the original on 30 January 2009
- Hager, Michael C (9 January 2005b), "Model 1897 Shotguns", The Winchester Collector, Winchester Arms Collectors Association, archived from the original on 4 February 2009
- Miller, David (2006). The History of Browning Firearms. First Lyons Press Edition. pp. 98–99. ISBN 9781592289103.
- Miller, David (2005). The Illustrated Directory of Guns. Collin Gower Enterprises Ltd. p. 694. ISBN 0-681-06685-7.
- Davis, Phil (7 August 2006). "Sangamon County Rifle Association Winchester Model 1897". Archived from the original on 4 February 2009.
- Farrow, Edward S. (1904). American Small Arms. New York: The Bradford Company. pp. 335–337.
- Henshaw, Thomas (1993). The History of Winchester Firearms (6th ed.). Winchester Press. pp. 48–50.
- Parks, W. Hays (1997). "October 1997 The Army Lawyer". Archived from the original on 2 July 2004.
- Smith, Morris F. (14 December 1911). "United States Patent Office". PIBEABM Patent Search. pp. 4–5.
- Thompson, Leroy (2013). US Combat Shotguns. Weapon 29. Osprey Publishing. ISBN 978-1-78096-014-2.
- Williamson, Harold F. (1952). Winchester (1st ed.). Washington DC: Combat Forces. pp. 158–159.
- Wilson, R. L. (2008). Winchester: An American Legend. New York: Book Sales, Inc. pp. 214–220. ISBN 978-0-7858-1893-9.
