= Billing =

Billing may refer to:

== Invoicing ==
- The process of sending an invoice (a bill) to customers for goods or services
  - Electronic billing
  - Medical billing, a payment practice within the United States health system
  - Telecommunications billing, systems and methods that collect information about calls and other services to be billed to the subscriber

== Places ==
- Billing, Northamptonshire
  - Billing Aquadrome, a leisure park in Great Billing, Northamptonshire
  - Billing Hall, Northamptonshire
- Mount Billing, a mountain in the Antarctic named for Graham Billing
- Rawdon Billing, a hill in West Yorkshire

== Other uses ==
- Billing (surname)
- Billing (birds), a behavior in some birds involving touching and clasping each other's bills
- Billing (performing arts), the display of credits for a creative work
- Billings ovulation method
- Heinz Billing Prize, for the advancement of scientific computation
- Billing, hymn tune by R R Terry.

== See also ==
- Billinge (disambiguation)
- Billingr, in Norse mythology the father of a maiden desired by Odin
- Billings (disambiguation)
- Bill (disambiguation)
- Bil (disambiguation)
