= Bruce Billings =

Bruce Billings may refer to:

- Bruce Billings (baseball) (born 1985), American baseball player
- Bruce Billings (cartoonist), American cartoonist
- Bruce H. Billings (1915–1992), American physicist
