= Judge Billings =

Judge Billings may refer to:

- Edward Coke Billings (1829–1893), judge of the United States District Court for the District of Louisiana and the Eastern District of Louisiana
- Franklin S. Billings Jr. (1922–2014), judge of the United States District Court for the District of Vermont
- Judith Billings (born 1943), judge of the Utah Court of Appeals

== See also ==
- Justice Billings (disambiguation)
