= Bruce H. Billings =

American physicist (1915–1992)

- Born: July 6, 1915
- Died: October 21, 1992 (aged 77); Long Beach, California
- Education: Harvard University; Johns Hopkins University
- Awards: American Academy of Arts and Sciences (1952)
- Scientific career
- Fields: Physics

Bruce Hadley Billings (July 6, 1915 – October 21, 1992) was an American physicist. He was president of the Optical Society of America in 1971. and the Polaroid Corporation's chief physicist between 1941 and 1947.

Billings was educated at Phillips Exeter Academy. He received his bachelor's degree in 1936 and his master's degree in 1937, both from Harvard University. Billings obtained his Ph.D. in 1941 from Johns Hopkins University. He was elected a Fellow of the American Academy of Arts and Sciences in 1952.

In the 1950s and 1960s Billings was senior vice president for research at Baird-Atomic, Inc. in Cambridge, Massachusetts, where he contributed to the development of analytical instrumentation for emission spectroscopy, dual-beam, recording infra-red absorption spectrometry, flame photometry, and investigated the potential of circular dichroism as the basis for instrumentation, a technology that Baird-Atomic, Inc. never commercialized.

Billings died in Long Beach, California, aged 77 from pancreatic cancer.

== See also ==
- Optical Society of America#Past Presidents of the OSA
