= 2023 United Kingdom pupil protests =

Protests held in secondary schools

The 2023 United Kingdom pupil protests were a series of protests, demonstrations and riots which occurred across secondary schools in the United Kingdom in February and March 2023. The protests were held in opposition to some school rules, especially concerning the use of school toilets during lesson times and rules relating to school uniforms. Videos of the protests were widely circulated on TikTok, with the platform also being used to organise and spread the protests.

== Background ==
=== Rules regarding toilet use ===
Prior to the protests, many schools had implemented rules restricting students from using school toilets during lesson time. Penrice Academy in St Austell, Cornwall, had also implemented a "red card scheme", allowing female students during menstrual periods to use school toilets. This policy was heavily criticised by parents, and was accused of being "controlling and archaic", while Cullompton Community College in Devon had removed doors from toilet blocks in a bid to reduce anti-social behaviour. The Discovery Academy in Stoke-on-Trent had installed metal gates at the toilets which were locked during lesson times.

=== School uniforms ===
Other rules which provoked anger from students were regarding school uniform policies, partially rules around skirt length for female students. At Rainford High School in Merseyside, female students had their skirt length checked by male members of staff, provoking anger from students and parents.

== Protests ==
Protests were held across the United Kingdom, with videos of protests being widely shared on TikTok. The platform, along with other social media platforms such as Snapchat, were also used to organise the protests.

On 24 February, during a protest at Penrice Academy, students wrecked goalposts and flipped tables, with one student being injured after attempting to scale a fence. Riot police attended Richmond School in North Yorkshire with reports stating teachers were pushed over and a tree was set on fire. A report by The Independent claimed that students let off fire extinguishers.

On 27 February the police were called to help control protests at Homewood School in Tenterden, Kent. Another protest on the same day in Neale-Wade Academy, Fenland, led to bins and urine being thrown.

== Response ==
Headteachers condemned the protests, and told parents not to encourage protesting by their children.

Conservative backbench MP and former teacher Jonathan Gullis blamed the protests on strike action being taken by teachers.
