= Billings Computer =

Defunct American computer company

Billings Computer Corporation
- Type: Public
- Industry: Computers
- Founded: 1977; 49 years ago in Provo, Utah
- Founder: Roger Billings
- Fate: Dissolution
- Divisions: Caldisk

Billings Computer Corporation was a publicly traded computer company and fully owned subsidiary of Billings Energy Corporation, a defunct American energy company based in Provo, Utah, that specialized in hydrogen fuel. Billings Computer was active between 1977 and 1985 and released several minicomputers and microcomputer systems.

== History ==
=== Foundation (1973–1979) ===
Roger Billings of Provo, Utah, founded Billings Computer in early 1977, four years after incorporating parent company Billings Energy Corporation. Billings Energy was a hydrogen fuel company that served as a springboard for Roger Billings and his associates' research; in the 1960s, the former earned a scholarship to Brigham Young University after winning an international high school science fair in 1965, with his project—a conversion of his father's Ford Model A into running on hydrogen. The company's computer subsidiary grew to be larger than its energy-focused parent company and made Billings a millionaire within three years of Billings Computer's incorporation. In March 1980, Billings designed a hydrogen-fuel-cell-powered forklift for the USDOS before moving the parent company to Independence, Missouri. Billings Computer remained in Provo, where its over 150 employees worked. This was six times the amount of employees in September 1977 but down from the subsidiary's peak headcount of 250 in September 1979.

The company's first computer system, the Data-Byte System 1, was announced in September 1977. It is a minicomputer based on the company's own design and was sold with the company's own dumb terminal, the B-100. The base system was sold with the central processing unit and front panel, the terminal, dual 8-inch floppy disk drives, and a bidirectional line printer. The system came shipped with its primary operating system and Fortran IV compiler. Optional was a memory module housing up to 1 MB of RAM, 50- and 300-MB hard disk drives, acoustic couplers, higher-speed printers, plotters, and ADC/DAC modules. Billings followed up their Data-Byte with the Billings Microsystem in February 1979. The Microsystem was an all-in-one microcomputer based on a 4 MHz Zilog Z80 microprocessor with 64 KB of RAM (8 KB definable as random-access or read-only), dual 5.25-inch floppy drives, and a 94-key keyboard. The Microsystem took US$1 million and four months to develop, over the final quarter of 1978. The company sold 100 units of the Microsystem into August 1979.

=== Growth (1979–1984) ===
In the beginning of 1979, Billings Computer announced their pending acquisition of the disk drive division of Calcomp (California Computer Products Inc.) for $1.8 million. Billings were joined in their acquisition of Calcomp by Xerox and Sanders Associates, the former buying the vast majority of Calcomp's solid-state memory assets and the latter buying all other assets of Calcomp outright, including the trademark. The acquisition was finalized in May 1979. While Billings initially suggested that they would move Calcomp's disk drive operations in Anaheim, California, to Provo, they retracted their plans move immediately and kept the factory in Anaheim until 1981. The division was later renamed to Caldisk; Berne D. Broadbent was named its president.

While its parent company reported losses for fiscal year 1978, Billings Computer had raked in $466,000 in net profit on $2,495,000 sales in the second fiscal quarter of 1979 alone. In preparation of growing demand, Billings Computer in August 1979 announced the raising of a 50,000-square-foot factory in Trenton, Utah in which to house new assembly lines for their products. Even with their success, the larger Billings Energy Corporation had yet to turn a profit by mid-1980, and in October 1980, Billings laid off a large percent of Caldisk amid constricting cash flow in the company, as well as failure to receive necessary parts for disk drives from other companies in the sluggish early 1980s economy.

In 1981 the company released the BC-12 and BC-12FD, all-in-one microcomputers like its predecessor the Microsystem based on the Z80A; they ran OASIS, a single-user operating system. In May 1982, Billings Computer introduced the 6000 series of modular minicomputers. The 6000 series comprised a stack of cabinets, each one serving a different purpose, and a CRT monitor intended to go on top. The main cabinet of the minicomputer was the 6000 CPU, housing the computer's main Z80A microprocessor and nine expansion slots (none populated by default); the 6000 CPU-1, with a second Z80A processor seven expansion slots and a floppy disk drive; and the 6000 CPU-2, which has two such disk drives and a third Z80A processor. Each cabinet houses 64 KB of RAM with parity. Optional was a video board, additional disk controllers, a mass-storage controller board for hard disks and tape drives (the latter making use of the board's integrated parallel interface), a dual-channel RS-232 serial interface board, and a serial communication interface board with support for asynchronous, synchronous, and bit-oriented communications protocols. The first customer of the 6000 series was Winnebago Industries of Forest City, Iowa. Chairman of Winnebago, John K. Hanson, paid for 100 units from the 6000 system family out of pocket, as his investment in both Winnebago and Billings posed a conflict of interest. Hanson later relinquished all his shares of Billings stock in August 1982.

Billings simultaneously released the 500 series, an upgraded version of the BC-12 line with an improved, non-glare CRT display, an internal power supply, and a detachable keyboard. The 500 series was available in three variants, each with 56 KB of RAM, which could hold up to 4 MB in mass storage. Multiple 500 machines could be hooked up to the 6000, the latter acting as a file server.

=== Demise (1984 – c. late 1980s) ===
In October 1982, Billings Energy—now based in Missouri—sold off $5 million worth of acreage dedicated to the Billings Computer both to relieve debts and buy up minority interests in the company. The next year in March, they opened a training center for the company's customers in Salt Lake City, Utah. In October 1984, after acquisitions of an unpaid loan to the order of $500,000 were launched against Billings' management, a group of gas and oil shareholders successfully ousted the company's board members, including Roger Billings. Discussions to sell off the computer division to the highest bidder were in talks among the new board members. The company instead moved the division's operations to Denver, Colorado, to be closer to its main client there.
