= Marland P. Billings =

American structural geologist

Marland Pratt Billings (March 11, 1902 – October 9, 1996) was an American structural geologist who was considered one of the greatest authorities on North American geology. Billings was Professor of Geology at Harvard University for almost his entire career, having joined the faculty in 1930 and retired to emeritus status in 1972. He also taught for a brief time at Bryn Mawr College.

== Biography ==
Billings was educated at Roxbury Latin School. He received his A.B. (1923), his A.M. (1925), and his Ph.D. (1927) from Harvard University.

In the 1950s, Billings studied the geology exposed by some of the bedrock tunnels being constructed in the Boston area by the Metropolitan District Commission for water supply and drainage disposal. He also investigated the geology of many parts of the world, including Iceland, Japan, and Australia.

Marland was married to Katharine Fowler-Billings an accomplished naturalist and geologist.

Marland Billings died Wednesday, October 9, 1996, in Peterborough, New Hampshire. He was 94.

== Involvement in the closing of the Harvard geography department in 1948 ==
In the 1940s, geography at Harvard was expanding, and part of the Department of Geology. During a dispute over a faculty promotion and worried that geography was taking resources from geology at Harvard, Billings wrote a series of letters questioning the importance of human geography and argued that resources would be better spent on geology than in geography. These letters led to administrative debates on the future of geography at Harvard.

As a result of events set in motion by these letters, in 1948, the Harvard geography department was dissolved, and its faculty members were reassigned to other departments or retired. The teaching of geography was integrated into other departments, such as the Department of Geology.

The closure of the geography department at Harvard was not solely due to Marland P. Billings' personal views or actions; however, his letters are seen as the initiation of the discussion around geography. The closure of geography at Harvard had cascading effects on the discipline across the country and is viewed as a major event in the history of the discipline from which it has never fully recovered.

== Awards and honors ==
- Fellow of the American Academy of Arts and Sciences (1938)
- Penrose Medal (1987)
- Member of the United States National Academy of Sciences

== Associations ==
- Geological Society of America, President 1959
- American Geophysical Union
- Mineralogical Society of America
- Seismological Society of America

== Bibliography ==
A partial list of books:

- Origin of the Appalachian Highlands (1932)
- Geology of the Littleton and Moosilauke quadrangles (1935)
- Geology of the Franconia quadrangle (1935)
- Structural Geology (1942) ISBN 0-87692-059-8
- The Geology of the Mt. Washington Quadrangle (1946)
- A Geological Map of New Hampshire (1955)
- Geology of New Hampshire (1956)
- Chemical analyses of rocks and rock-minerals from New Hampshire (1965)
- Geology of the Gorham Quadrangle: New Hampshire-Maine (1965)
- Geology of the Malden tunnel, Massachusetts (1966)
- Geology of the North Metropolitan Relief Tunnel, great Boston, Massachusetts (1975)
- Bedrock geology (The Geology of New Hampshire) (1980)
