= Robert Billings =

Canadian poet and editor

Robert Billings (1949 – 1986) was a Canadian poet and editor.

== Biography ==
Robert Billings was born in Niagara Falls, Ontario and raised in Fort Erie. He held two master's degrees in English from Queen's University and the University of Windsor. Billings became well known in Canadian literary circles as a poet, critic, teacher, and editor of Poetry Canada Review and Poetry Toronto. His poems and reviews of Canadian poetry have appeared widely in Canada, Britain, and the United States.

Suffering from depression after the breakdown of his marriage, Billings committed suicide at Niagara Falls in November 1986. Efforts to find the body were halted once Horseshoe Falls froze over, and the ice melted before his body was recovered six months later in June.

== Literary activities ==
During the 1980s Robert Billings was editor for literary magazines such as Quarry, Poetry Windsor, Poesie, Poetry Canada Review and Waves. He was also very active as a poet.

== Published works ==
- blue negatives Fiddlehead Poetry Books #212 Fred Cogswell ISBN 0-920110-20-7
- The Elizabeth Trinities Penumbra Press, 1980
- The Revels, Porcupine's Quil Inc., 1987
