= Katharine Fowler-Billings =

American naturalist and geologist

- Born: Katharine Fowler; 1902; Little Boar's Head, New Hampshire
- Died: December 17, 1997 (aged 94–95)
- Education: Bryn Mawr College, B.A., 1925; University of Wisconsin, M.A., 1926; Columbia University, Ph.D., 1930
- Known for: Naturalist, geologist, and environmental activist
- Spouses: James W. Lunn; Marland Pratt Billings
- Children: 2

Katharine (Kay) Fowler-Billings (1902 – December 17, 1997) was an American naturalist and geologist. She is commonly known for being one of the earliest female geologists. Katharine was raised in Boston, Massachusetts, she attend Bryn Mawr College for her B.A., University of Wisconsin for her M.A., and Columbia University for her PhD.

She was an environmental activist in New England.

Katharine Fowler Billings died December 17, 1997, in Peterborough, New Hampshire. She was 95.

== Personal life ==
Katharine was born in Little Boar's Head, New Hampshire in 1902 to William Plumer Fowler and Susan Farnham Smith. As a child, for most of the year she and her family would live in Boston, but during the summer they would travel to their coastal home in Little Boar's Head. However, she suffered from hay fever while in the coastal village, so her doctor recommended trips to the White Mountains instead, which were known to help those suffering from hay fever alleviate their symptoms. From the age of seven up, until she left for college, Katharine would spend every August in Randolph, New Hampshire with a widow, where she developed an appreciation for the mountainous region. These trips would influence Katharine to take up the study of geology.

Both of her parents died before she obtained all her education credentials.

She was married twice. The first was to fellow geologist James W. Lunn, who she met when attending the International Geological Congress in 1929; she would later take on his last name. In 1938, she married Marland Pratt Billings, whom she met at Harvard while he was junior faculty, pursuing an attempt to establish his career as a professor. She then changed her surname to Fowler-Billings, and had two children with him.

== Education ==
She was raised in Boston, where she went to a select girls school, and then went on to earn her B.A. at Bryn Mawr College which she completed in 1925. In 1926 she finished her M.A. at the University of Wisconsin. She then went on to receive further geological training in the Rocky Mountains. A few years later she received a PhD from Columbia University in 1930. Her "publication record ... includes fundamental geological descriptions of large areas in Wyoming, Sierra Leone, and New Hampshire."

== Research ==
Fowler-Billings made many geological expeditions around the world during her career, where she would take pictures of archaeological sites, landscapes, and other geological phenomenon that she investigated in locations like Russia, Sierra Leone and Japan. While she spent the majority of her career doing geological research, she also held a teaching position at three different colleges: at Wellesley College and Tufts College in Massachusetts, and at Erskine Junior College in South Carolina.

When Fowler-Billings began her career, the field of geology predominantly consisted of men, and the sexism she faced often prevented her from conducting her research. Due to this, she would occasionally disguise herself as a man to access geological sites and continue her research.

The geologists who worked at the White Mountains found that the dense vegetation made it almost impossible for their work to be conducted. The Billings investigated all the streams studying the outcropping and exposed rocks. They mapped out Mount Washington which yielded a greater understanding of the complex structural geology of the White Mountains.

During the summer of 1928, Fowler-Billings began studying a portion of Laramie Mountains in Wyoming. At this time there were no topographic maps and only two reports on oxide deposits. Fowler-Billings started doing pace-and-compass traverses to develop a map of the area. During these traverses she developed an accurate representation of the history of Laramie Mountains. She is commonly known for identifying three periods of uplift, Precambrian, Ancestral Rocks, and Laramide Events. By the end of the summer she had produced a geological map that identified all of what we now refer to as Laramie anorthosite complex (LAC).

== Publications ==
- The Gold Missus: A woman prospector in Sierra Leone (1938)
- Geology of the Cardigan and Rumney quadrangles, New Hampshire (1942)
- Igneous and metasedimentary dikes of the Mt. Washington area, New Hampshire (1944)
- Sillimanite deposits in the Monadnock Quadrangle, (New Hampshire. State Planning and Development Commission. Mineral resource survey) (1944)
- The geology of the Monadnock quadrangle, New Hampshire (1949)
- The geological story of Wellesley (1961)
- Geology of the Isles of Shoals (1977)
- Fowler-Billings, Katharine (1996). Stepping stones : the reminiscences of a woman geologist in the twentieth century. New Haven, Conn.: Connecticut Academy of Arts and Sciences. ISBN 978-1878508119.

== Honors and legacy ==
The Billings Fund was established in 1996 just a year before Katharine's death to honor the diligent work and accomplishments of the Billings. This fund was established to encourage fieldwork and research through grant programs, which were typically around the US$1000 range. In 2013, the principal of the Billings Fund was transferred to the Geological Society of America Foundation (GSAF), which will provide stewardship to the fund. While the fund was previously administering grants to undergraduate students, the GSAF will also administer funds to graduate students. Applications are forwarded each year for the grants and are reviewed accordingly, typically only a few grants are awarded each year.

She was an Honorary Fellow of the New Hampshire Geological Society.

The Marland Pratt Billings and Katharine Fowler-Billings Fund for Research in New England Geology was established to honor the contributions to "the study of the geology of New England" by Fowler-Billings and her husband.
