= Christopher Miner Spencer =

American inventor

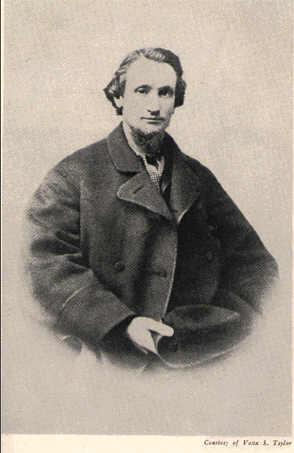
- Born: Christopher Miner Spencer; June 20, 1833; Manchester, Connecticut
- Died: January 14, 1922 (aged 88); Windsor, Connecticut
- Occupation: Weapons designer
- Children: Percival H. Spencer

Christopher Miner Spencer (June 20, 1833 – January 14, 1922) was an American inventor, from Manchester, Connecticut, who invented the Spencer repeating rifle, one of the earliest models of lever-action rifle, a steam powered "horseless carriage", and several other inventions. He developed the first fully automatic turret lathe, which in its small- to medium-sized form is also known as a screw machine.

== Early years ==
Spencer worked for Samuel Colt’s factory, where he learned the arms-making trade.

== Civil War ==
Although the Spencer rifle had been developed as early as 1859, it was not initially used by the Union. On August 18, 1863, Christopher Spencer walked into the White House carrying one of his rifles and a supply of cartridges. He walked past the sentries, and into Abraham Lincoln's office. After some discussion, he returned the following afternoon, when Spencer and Lincoln were joined by Edwin Stanton, Secretary of War and other officials, and the group then proceeded to walk out on the Mall. Near the site of the Washington Monument, they engaged in target shooting.

Subsequent to that meeting, the US ordered some 13,171 rifles and carbines, along with some 58 million rounds of ammunition. General Ulysses S. Grant declared Spencer rifles "the best breech-loading arms available". Total wartime production approached 100,000 rifles. Many veterans took these rifles home with them after the war and their rifles saw widespread use on the western frontier. With so many military surplus rifles available, there was little post-war demand for new rifles; and Spencer was unable to recover investments made in manufacturing machinery. Spencer Repeating Rifle Company declaring bankruptcy in 1868; and assets were acquired by Oliver Winchester for $200,000 in 1869.

== Post-Civil War ==
In 1868, while at the Roper Repeating Arms Company in Amherst, Massachusetts, he worked with Charles E. Billings, and Sylvester H. Roper. After Roper's firearms company failed, and the following year, 1869, Billings and Spencer founded a partnership in Hartford, Connecticut called Billings & Spencer, which would manufacture sewing machines, drop-forged hand tools, and machine tools.

Around 1882, Spencer started a new company, the Spencer Arms Company, in Windsor, Connecticut. Its most remarkable product was likely the Spencer Pump-Action Shotgun. Produced between 1882 and 1889, this was the first commercially successful slide-action (or pump-action) shotgun, the Spencer 1882. Most were manufactured in 12-gauge with 10-gauge being an uncommon variant. Once again faced with financial hardships, Spencer's company and his patents were purchased circa 1890 by Francis Bannerman & Sons of New York who continued to manufacture his shotgun until around 1907.

== In popular culture ==
The Civil War TV mini-series, The Blue and the Gray, features a reenactment of Abraham Lincoln's test of the Spencer rifle, with Gregory Peck as Lincoln and David Rounds as Christopher Spencer.

== Bibliography ==
- Bainbridge, Jr., John (2022). Gun Barons: the weapons that transformed America and the men who invented them. New York: St. Martin's Press. ISBN 978-1-250-26686-6.
- Roe, Joseph Wickham (1916), English and American Tool Builders, New Haven, Connecticut: Yale University Press, LCCN 16011753. Reprinted by McGraw-Hill, New York and London, 1926 (LCCN 27-24075); and by Lindsay Publications, Inc., Bradley, Illinois (ISBN 978-0-917914-73-7).
- Rolt, L.T.C. (1965), A Short History of Machine Tools, Cambridge, Massachusetts, USA: MIT Press, LCCN 65012439.
- Flayderman, Norm (1990), Flayderman's Guide to Antique American Firearms...and their values, 5th Edition, Northbrook, Illinois, USA: DBI Books, Inc., 1990.
