= McGregor Billing =

South African cricketer

Personal information
- Full name: McGregor Edward Billing
- Born: 12 January 1887; Johannesburg, South African Republic
- Died: 3 November 1965 (aged 78); Durban, South Africa
- Batting: Right-handed
- Bowling: Right-arm fast

Domestic team information
- Years: Team
- 1920-21 to 1925-26: Natal

Career statistics
Competition	First-class
Matches	16
Runs scored	192
Batting average	12.00
100s/50s	0/0
Top score	32
Balls bowled	2639
Wickets	59
Bowling average	19.13
5 wickets in innings	4
10 wickets in match	0
Best bowling	7/95
Catches/stumpings	11/–
- Source: Cricinfo, 29 October 2017

McGregor Edward Billing (12 January 1887 – 3 November 1965) was a South African cricketer who played first-class cricket from 1920 to 1926.

A fast bowler, McGregor Billing made his first-class debut in 1920–21 at the age of 33. In the final match of that Currie Cup season, when Natal needed to beat Western Province to win the title, Billing took 6 for 42 (five bowled) to dismiss Western Province in their second innings for 134 and leave a target of 227 for Natal to win, but they were dismissed for 199. In 1921-22 the same teams again met in the final match of the Currie Cup; this time Billing took 2 for 52 and 5 for 37 to help Natal to victory and a shared title with Western Province and Transvaal.

He played only one first-class match in 1922–23, when Natal played the touring MCC. He took 7 for 95 in MCC's first innings, his victims including Frank Woolley and Phil Mead, and again dismissed Woolley in the second innings, but Natal lost heavily.

Billing took five wickets for Natal against S. B. Joel's English team in 1924–25, and was later selected for South Africa in the first of the five unofficial Tests. He took the wicket of the opener Jack MacBryan cheaply in each innings, and made his highest first-class score of 32, and South Africa won, but he did not play any further matches in the series. He played his last first-class match in 1925–26, when he took 5 for 22 and 2 for 61 in a victory over Transvaal in the Currie Cup, just before his 39th birthday.
