= Billings Refinery =

Billings Refinery may refer to one of two oil refineries located in Billings, Montana:

- Billings Refinery (Par Pacific), refinery operated by Par Pacific and formerly by ExxonMobil
- Billings Refinery (Phillips 66), Phillips 66 oil refinery
