= Justice Billings =

Justice Billings may refer to:

- Franklin S. Billings Jr. (1922–2014), chief justice of the Vermont Supreme Court
- Rhoda Billings (1937–2025), chief justice of the North Carolina Supreme Court
- William Howard Billings (1921–1991), associate justice of the Supreme Court of Missouri

== See also ==
- Judge Billings (disambiguation)
