= Charles Billings (politician) =

Charles Billings (1825 – November 1906) was a municipal official, educator, farmer and politician in Gloucester Township, Ontario. He served as reeve for the township in 1852.

The son of Braddish Billings and Lamira Dow, he studied law and articled for a law office in Buffalo, but never entered the practice of law. Billings helped establish the General Protestant Hospital in Bytown. He was elected reeve for Gloucester in 1852 and served on the education committee for Carleton County. Billings served as the township clerk from 1854 to 1906. He also taught school at Billings Bridge from 1856 to 1863 and looked after the family farm. In 1858, he married Maria Murray.
