= Billings and Edmonds =

British school uniform supplier

Coordinates: 51.4925°N 0.2632°W

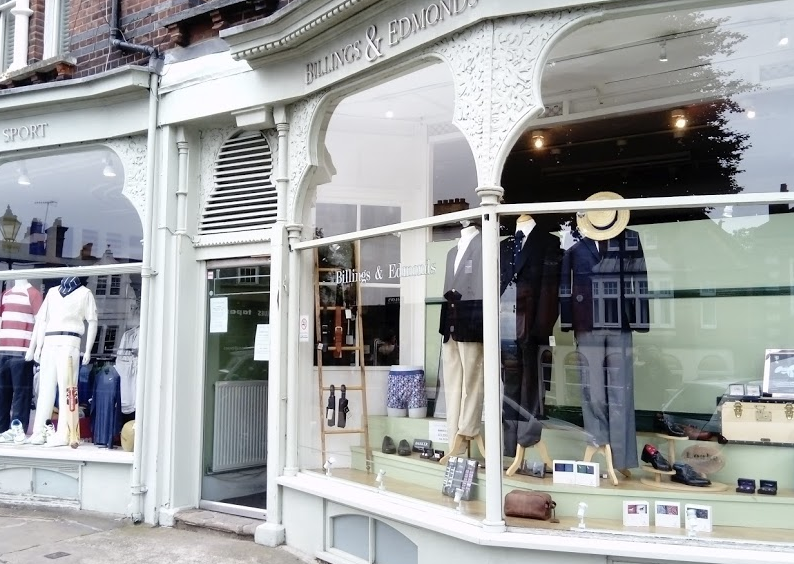
Billings & Edmonds, Harrow School Branch

Billings and Edmonds is a British school uniform supplier. It was originally a gentlemen's tailor, and later changed its tailoring business towards the school uniform market. They operate an online business but also have High Street shops in Eton, Harrow on the Hill and Chiswick. The Harrow Branch, which serves Harrow School boys, until the 1980s was called Stevens, Billings & Edmonds when Billings & Edmonds incorporated the local Harrow tailor and other Harrow School outfitters, F.W.Stevens. Currently their Harrow branch has been renamed back to simply, 'Billings & Edmonds'. The first shop was in Princes Street, off Hanover Square, midway between the tailoring district of Savile Row and Regent Street. It claims to be founded in 1896, and accounts are extant from 1898- the current director Colin Edmonds is the fourth generation in the firm.

School catalogues are available from the 1920s that show they were supplying to Eton College, Harrow School, Stowe, Oundle, Rugby, Lancing, Heathfield School and Godolphin & Latymer. The supplier is used by forty independent schools in England.
