= Charles L. Billings =

American politician and businessman

Charles Lewis Billings (October 27, 1856 – November 17, 1938) was an American politician and businessman.

== Biography ==
Billings was born in Highland, Iowa County, Wisconsin. He went to the University of Wisconsin–Platteville and the University of Wisconsin–Madison. Billings was admitted to the Wisconsin bar in 1883. He was also admitted to the Illinois and Missouri bars in 1884 and in 1888. Billings practiced law in Chicago, Illinois. He served in the Illinois Senate from 1907 to 1911 and was a Republican. Billings introduced a women's suffrage bill while still in the Illinois Senate. Billings died in Chicago, Illinois from a heart ailment.
