= Charles E. Billings =

American mechanical engineer (1834–1920)

Charles Ethan Billings
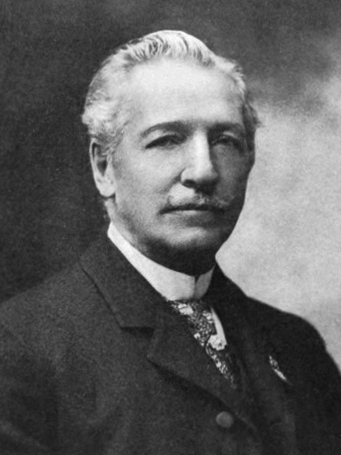
- Born: December 5, 1834; Weathersfield, Vermont
- Died: June 5, 1920 (aged 85); Hartford, Connecticut
- Resting place: Cedar Hill Cemetery

Charles Ethan Billings (1834–1920) was an American mechanical engineer, inventor, superintendent, and businessman. He held various U.S. patents on hand tools, either assigned or licensed to the firm that he and Christopher M. Spencer cofounded, the Billings & Spencer Company. His name as patent holder is stamped (as C.E. Billings) on countless forged hand tools, many of which survive. Billings was an expert in drop forging and was an influential leader in the American system of manufacturing and its successor systems of mass production for firearms, sewing machines, hand tools, bicycles, and other goods. He served as president of the American Society of Mechanical Engineers in 1895 and 1896. The Billings & Spencer Company was both a machine tool builder and a manufacturer of hand tools made with its machine tools.

== Biography ==
He was born in Weathersfield, Vermont, the son of Ethan F. and Clarissa M. (née Marsh) Billings. He served his apprenticeship at Robbins & Lawrence in Windsor, Vermont. Robbins & Lawrence was a factory and armory that was an important early node in the social network of the 19th century machine tool industry.

In 1856, at the age of 21, he worked at the Colt armory in Hartford, Connecticut, as a die sinker and tool maker and became their expert on the drop forging process. In 1862, he went to E. Remington & Sons, where he built up their forging plant, increasing its efficiency and saving $50,000 by one improvement in frame forging alone. At the end of the American Civil War, he returned to Hartford as the superintendent of the Weed Sewing Machine Company, which had taken over the old Sharps Rifle Works, built by Robbins & Lawrence.

In 1868, while at the Roper Repeating Arms Company in Amherst, Massachusetts, he worked with Christopher M. Spencer. The Roper company failed and in 1869, the two founded a partnership in Hartford, Connecticut, called Billings & Spencer, which would manufacture sewing machines, drop-forged hand tools, and machine tools. Billings perfected a drop hammer for metal forging in the 1870s and designed the copper commutator which was central to the operation of electrical generators and motors.

In 1895, Billings was president of the American Society of Mechanical Engineers.

He died on June 5, 1920, in Hartford, Connecticut, and was interred at Cedar Hill Cemetery.

== List of patents held ==
This list may not be exhaustive; if you like, you can verify its exhaustiveness with a US patent search.

- U.S. patent 212,298
- U.S. patent 470,777
- U.S. patent 532,634

== Bibliography ==
- Roe, Joseph Wickham (1916), English and American Tool Builders, New Haven, Connecticut: Yale University Press, LCCN 16011753. Reprinted by McGraw-Hill, New York and London, 1926 (LCCN 27-24075); and by Lindsay Publications, Inc., Bradley, Illinois (ISBN 978-0-917914-73-7).
