= Boar Spear with Double Barrel Wheellock Pistol (Metropolitan Museum of Art) =

Combination weapon in the collection Metropolitan Museum of Art

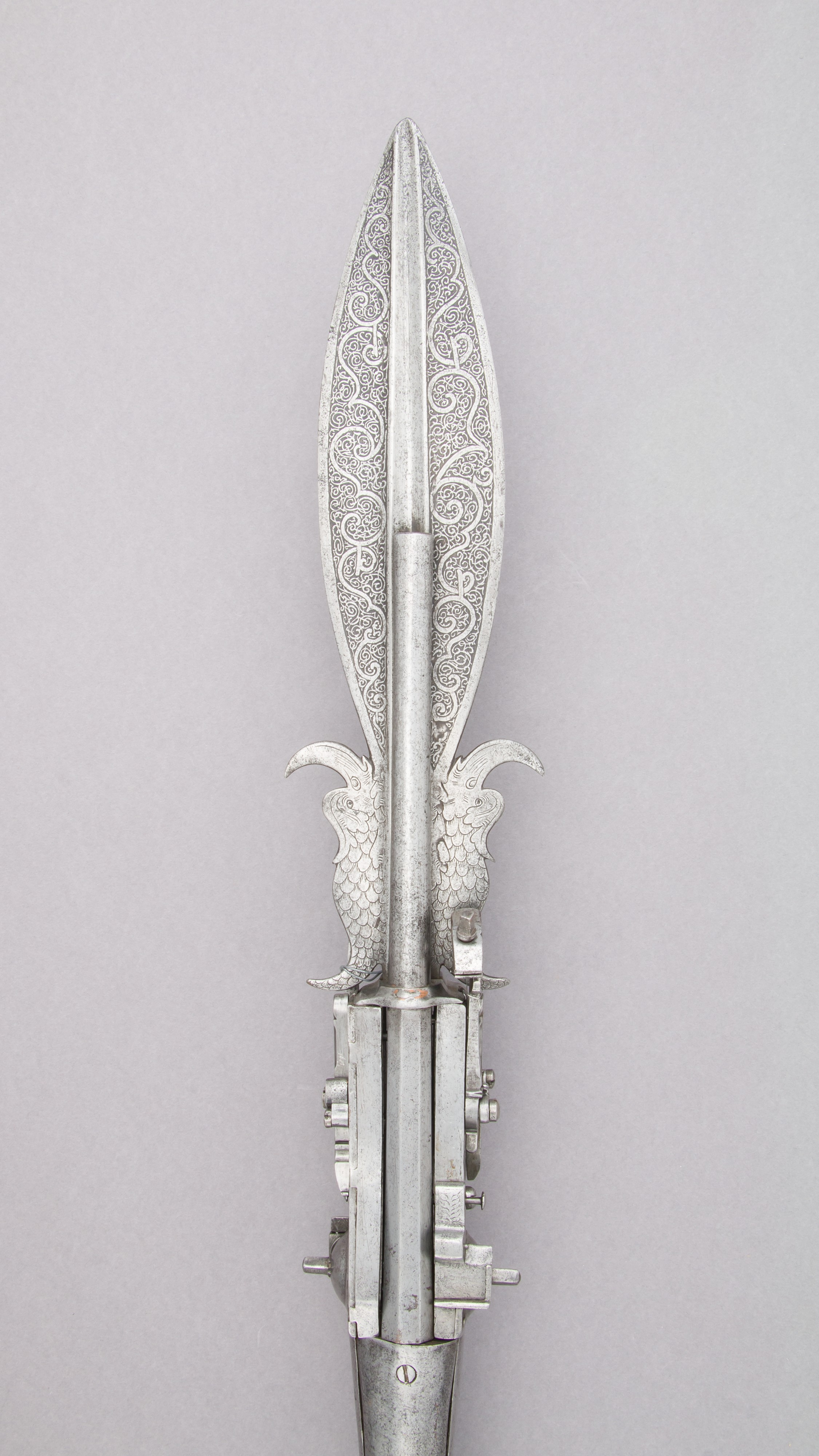
- Year: c. 1575
- Medium: Steel, wood
- Dimensions: 227.96 cm (89.75 in)
- Location: Metropolitan Museum of Art; New York

The Metropolitan Museum of Art holds a 16th-century combination weapon in its armaments collection. The weapon is an 89 3/4 inch boar spear with two wheellock pistol barrels fused to both flat sides of the spear's head; the intent of this design was to provide the wielder with the extra stopping power of two .41 caliber musket balls that could be fired at targets out of the reach of the spear. Some sources posit that such weapons were instead experimental pieces or curiosities. The 9 lb, German-made weapon was donated to the Met's collection by the Roger's fund in 1904.

== Gallery ==
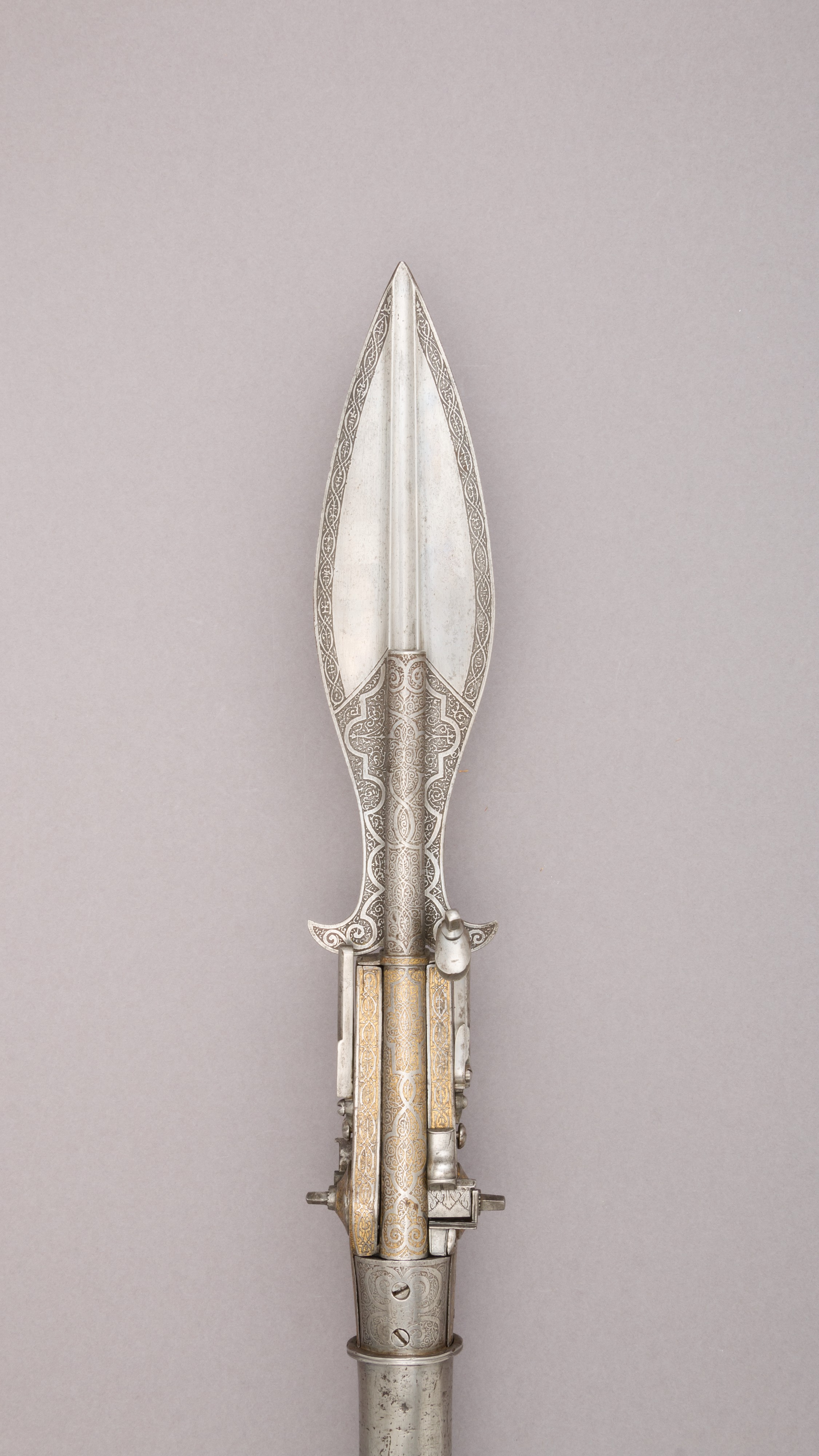

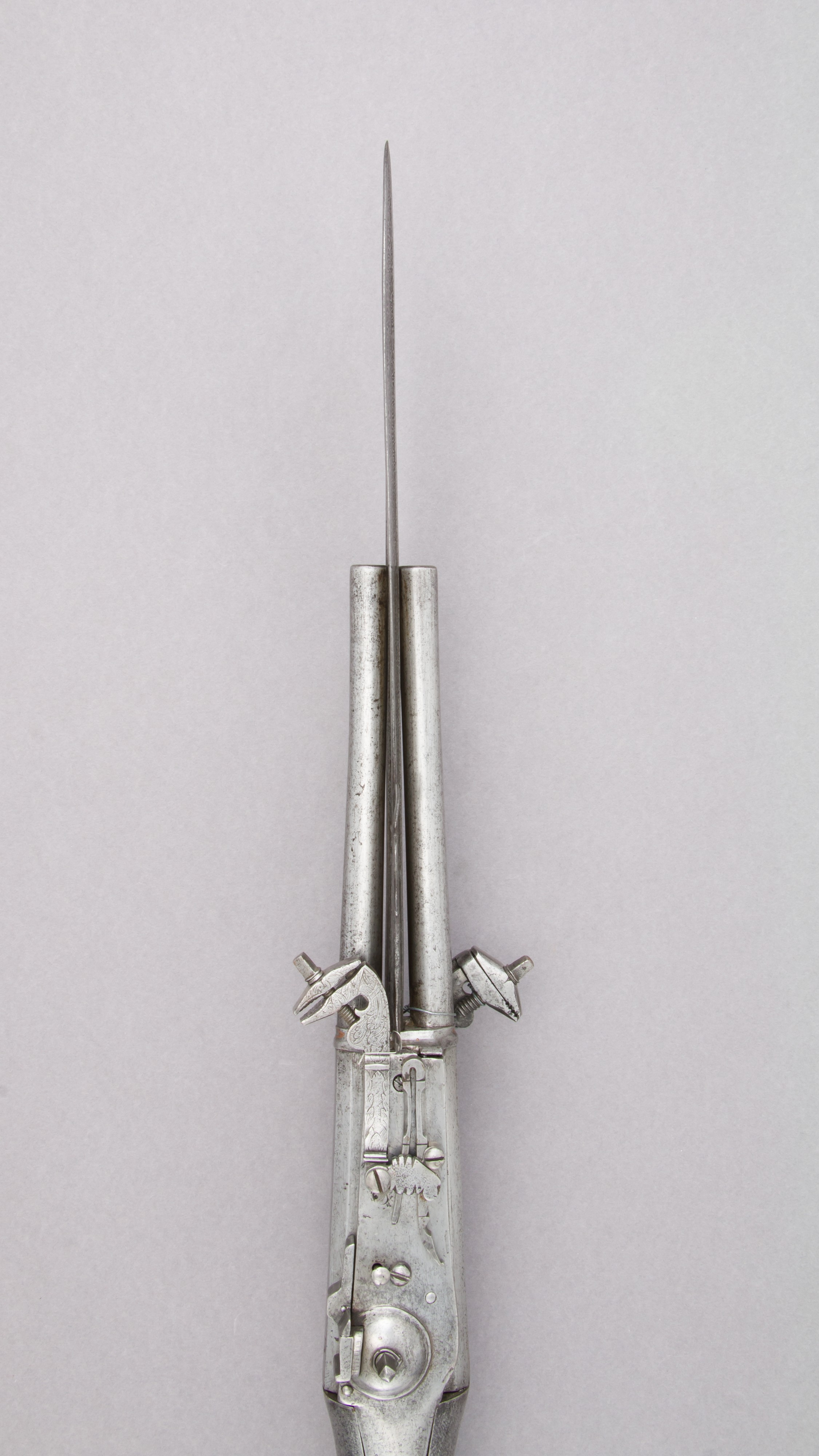

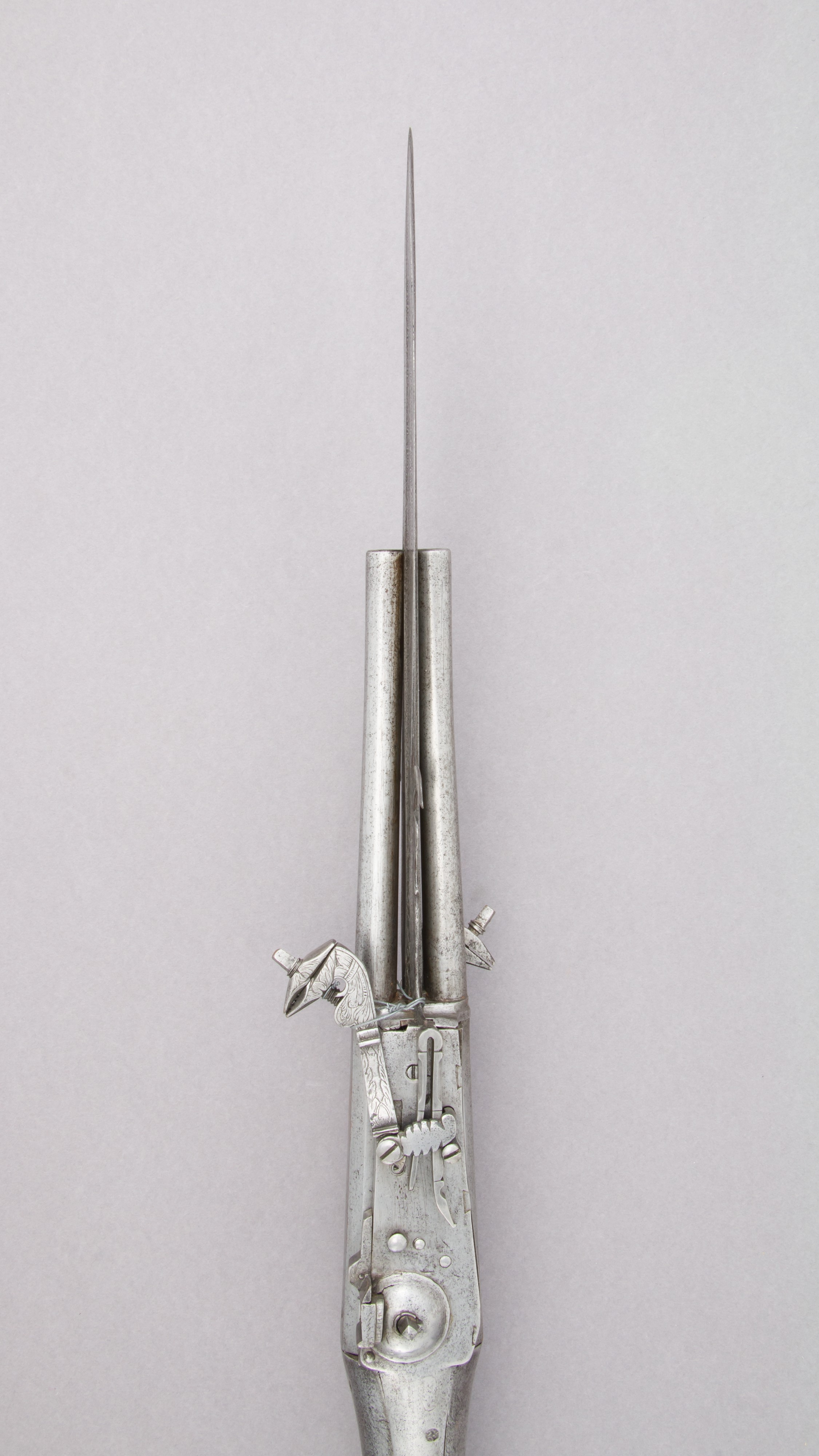
