= ECoC =

ECoC or eCoC may refer to:

- European Capital of Culture.
- electronic certificate of conformity.
- European Conference on Optical Communication.
- Encyclopaedia of Chess Openings.
