= Ballistic knife =

Knife with ejectable blade

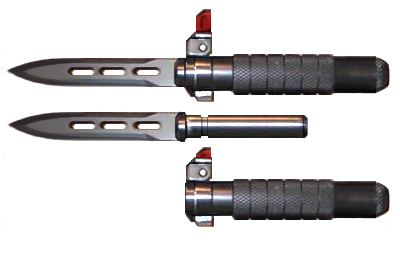
U.S. made spring-powered ballistic knife

A ballistic knife is a knife with a detachable blade that can be ejected to a distance of several meters by pressing a trigger or operating a lever or switch on the handle. Spring-powered ballistic knives first appeared in books and press reports on Soviet and Eastern Bloc armed forces in the late 1970s. Commercially-produced ballistic knives gained notoriety in the United States in the mid-1980s after being marketed and sold in the United States and other Western countries. Since then, the marketing and sale of ballistic knives to civilians has been restricted or prohibited by law in several nations.

== Usage ==
In its spring-propelled form, the blade of a ballistic knife is theoretically capable of being fired to an effective range of around 5 meters (about 16 feet) at a speed of 63 km/h (39 mph). Ballistic knives using compressed air or gas propulsion to fire the blade can be made somewhat more powerful, and do not suffer from spring fatigue over time.

In addition to spring, air, or gas propulsion, the blade of a ballistic knife may also be propelled by an explosive charge, such as a blank pistol cartridge.

== Development, usage, and laws ==
=== Soviet Union ===
The first press reports of what became known as the ballistic knife appeared in the late 1970s in connection with the Soviet Union's special operations forces. In his book Inside The Aquarium, Viktor Suvorov described a ballistic knife as part of a Soviet spetsnaz trooper's equipment. Due to this being the only and biased source of this claim, Russian sources claim this to be a myth.

An NRS-2 combination knife/gun was designed and developed during the 1970s at the order of the Russian Ministry of Defence and KGB of the USSR. However, the NRS-2 was not a ballistic knife, but a gun hybrid (instead of launching the blade, a small barrel aligned with the blade fires a non-standard 7.62mm bullet).

=== United States ===
Commercial versions of the ballistic knife first appeared in the US market in the mid-1980s. After hearing uncorroborated testimony from a congressional witness that ballistic knives could be used to defeat body armor typically worn by police officers, and witnessing a staged demonstration against a wood-backed target, Senator Alphonse D'Amato of New York introduced the Ballistic Knife Prohibition Act, a bill to ban sale or possession of ballistic knives. The bill eventually failed. However, after gaining the support of Senators Strom Thurmond of South Carolina, and Dennis DeConcini of Arizona, congressional support for a ban on import or possession of ballistic knives quickly gained traction. In September 1986, senators supporting the ballistic knife ban attached their bill to popular legislation designed to eradicate drug crops in foreign countries and halt international drug trafficking operations. The bill was subsequently enacted into law. The new federal statute prohibited future importation or possession of such knives in interstate commerce. Some individual states have followed the example set by the federal law and passed even tighter restrictions, sometimes banning the ownership of the knives outright within their state.

Similar to conventional automatic knives, federal law makes ballistic knives with a spring-operated blade illegal to possess, manufacture, sell, or import "in or affecting interstate commerce." This means they are illegal to import from outside the United States, as well as buy or sell over state lines, including possessing or making them with intent to sell over state lines. The federal law also makes it a separate crime to use or possess a ballistic knife during the commission of a federal crime of violence, with a minimum sentence of five years in a federal prison. Federal law does not prohibit the possession, manufacture, or sale of a ballistic knife within a state's boundaries. The individual laws of each state or territory must be consulted to determine whether possession, manufacture, or sale within a given state is legal (many states have statutes that regulate or prohibit the acquisition or possession of ballistic knives, and penalties vary from state to state). Like the federal switchblade law, an exception is made for sale to the United States Armed Forces within the confines of a contract, as well as possession by duly-authorized members of the Armed Forces in performance of their duty.

A ballistic knife with a blade propelled by an explosive charge falls outside the Federal law about these devices. Still, it may be restricted as this makes it a firearm subject to the Any Other Weapons (AOW) category of the National Firearms Act.

=== United Kingdom ===
Ballistic and pilum knives are prohibited under current legislation in the United Kingdom. and this has resulted in a tendency to interpret any bladed object of questionable status as falling within the definition of a prohibited knife.

Whilst "ballistic knives" are not specifically mentioned in any legislation, the marketing, sale, transfer, or possession in a public place of a ballistic knife could be construed to be illegal under the Restriction of Offensive Weapons Act 1959, the Knives Act 1997, the Criminal Justice Act 1988, and the Prevention of Crime Act 1953. The Restriction of Offensive Weapons Act 1959 imposes criminal penalties for anyone who manufactures, sells or hires, or offers for sale or hire, or lends or gives to any other person "any knife which has a blade which opens automatically by hand pressure applied to a button, spring or other device in or attached to the handle of the knife." The Knives Act 1997 prohibits the marketing of knives as offensive weapons, while the Criminal Justice Act 1988 prohibits the carrying of blades or sharply pointed objects in a public place without "good reason or lawful authority". Finally, the Prevention of Crime Act 1953 prohibits the possession in any public place of an offensive weapon without "lawful authority or reasonable excuse." The term "offensive weapon" is defined under the Prevention of Crime Act 1953 as: "any article made or adapted for use to causing injury to the person, or intended by the person having it with him for such use". Under the Prevention of Crime Act, knives otherwise 'exempt' from penalty under the Criminal Justice Act 1988 when carried for "good reason or lawful authority" may still be deemed illegal if authorities conclude the knife is being carried as an "offensive weapon" without "lawful authority or reasonable excuse". 'Lawful authority' means those occasions where people from time to time are required to carry weapons as a matter of governmental duty, such as police officers or members of the armed forces, not private persons, hence the 'lawful authority' language cannot be relied upon to establish an exemption from prosecution of private individuals. Furthermore, as the ballistic knife was originally designed as an offensive weapon and given current prosecutorial directives, it may be difficult to establish "reasonable excuse" for carrying such a knife before a UK prosecutor or court, especially as the carrying of a knife in public for self-defence is not acceptable as a "reasonable excuse". In the eyes of the law, claims of self-protection are presently viewed as an admission that the defendant intends to use the knife in violation of the law as an "offensive weapon" - albeit in a defensive manner, and otherwise justifiable circumstances.

== See also ==
- Combination weapons
- Knife legislation
- Pistol sword
- Switchblade
- Throwing knife
