= Ecodesign Directive =

European Union directive

The Ecodesign Directive (Directive 2009/125/EC) of the European Union establishes a framework to set mandatory ecological requirements for energy-using and energy-related products sold in all 27 member states. Its scope currently covers more than 40 product groups (such as boilers, lightbulbs, TVs and fridges), which are responsible for around 40% of all EU greenhouse gas emissions.

The 2009 revision of the Directive extended its scope to energy-related products such as windows, insulation materials and certain water-using products.

The ultimate aim of the Ecodesign Directive is that manufacturers of energy-using products (EuP) will, at the design stage, be obliged to reduce the energy consumption and other negative environmental impacts of products. While the Directive's primary aim is to reduce energy use, it is also aimed at enforcing other environmental considerations including: materials use; water use; polluting emissions; waste issues and recyclability.

The Ecodesign Directive is a framework directive, meaning that it does not directly set minimum ecological requirements. These are adopted through specific implementing measures for each group of products in the scope of the Directive. The implementing measures are adopted through the so-called comitology procedure. Implementing measures are based on EU internal market rules governing which products may be placed on the market. Manufacturers who begin marketing an energy-using product covered by an implementing measure in the EU area have to ensure that it conforms to the energy and environmental standards set out by the measure.

In practice, the introduction of a new minimum requirement results in effectively banning all non-compliant products from being sold in the 28 Member States. This was for example the case of incandescent lamps, for which a gradual phaseout started in the EU in 2009 under this Directive. This measure alone – which received some criticism in parts of the media but welcomed by environmentalists – is expected to reduce annual CO_{2} emissions by 16 million tons in 2020.

== Scope of the Directive ==
The 2005 Ecodesign directive covered energy-using products (EuP), which use, generate, transfer or measure energy, including consumer goods such as boilers, water heaters, computers, televisions, and industrial products such as transformers. The implementing measures focus on those products which have a high potential for reducing greenhouse gas emissions at low cost, through reduced energy demand.

The first Working Plan of the Ecodesign Directive was adopted on 21 October 2008.

It establishes a list of 10 product groups to be considered in priority for implementing measures in 2009–2011:

- Air conditioning and ventilation systems, including air conditioning system pumps
- Electric and fossil-fuelled heating equipment
- Food-preparing equipment
- Industrial and laboratory furnaces and ovens
- Machine tools
- Network, data processing and data storing equipment
- Refrigerating and freezing equipment
- Sound and imaging equipment
- Transformers
- Water-using equipment

Nine implementing measures have already been adopted – for a total energy saving of 341 TWh, or 12% of the electricity consumption of the EU. Several preparatory studies by DG Energy are completed or ongoing.

The European Commission will be tabling a Circular Economy proposal towards the end of 2015. Eco-design is likely to be discussed within this framework.

== Smartphones, mobile phones, cordless phones and tablets ==
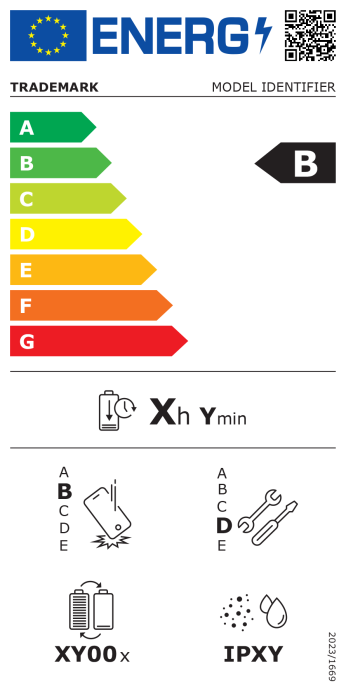
EU smartphone label.

The 16 June 2023 regulation introduces from 20 June 2025 onward mandatory labeling with a minimum of 5 years of operating system upgrades, and minimum requirements and rating for resistance to 1 meter height free fall (except for tablets), battery durability, repairability, and dust and water resistance. The battery endurance per cycle is also rated. The repairability rating includes points awarded for software updates above the minimum requirements. The devices have to include a user-selectable option to limit battery charging to 80 % of the capacity to increase battery lifespan. The devices have to either have a user-replaceable battery or both higher battery durability and resistance to immersion in water.

== See also ==
- Energy Star
