= Basque Cybersecurity Centre =

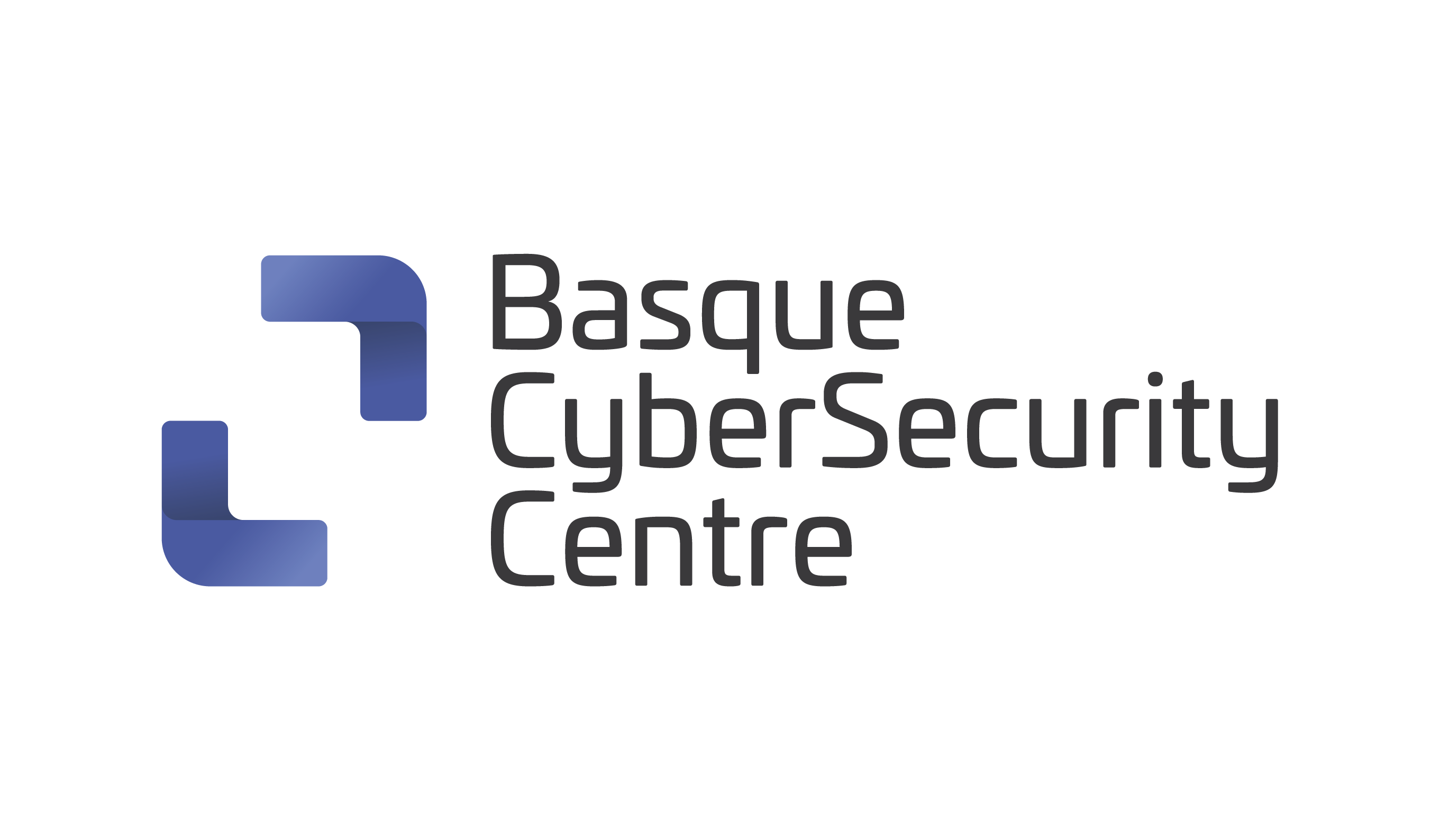

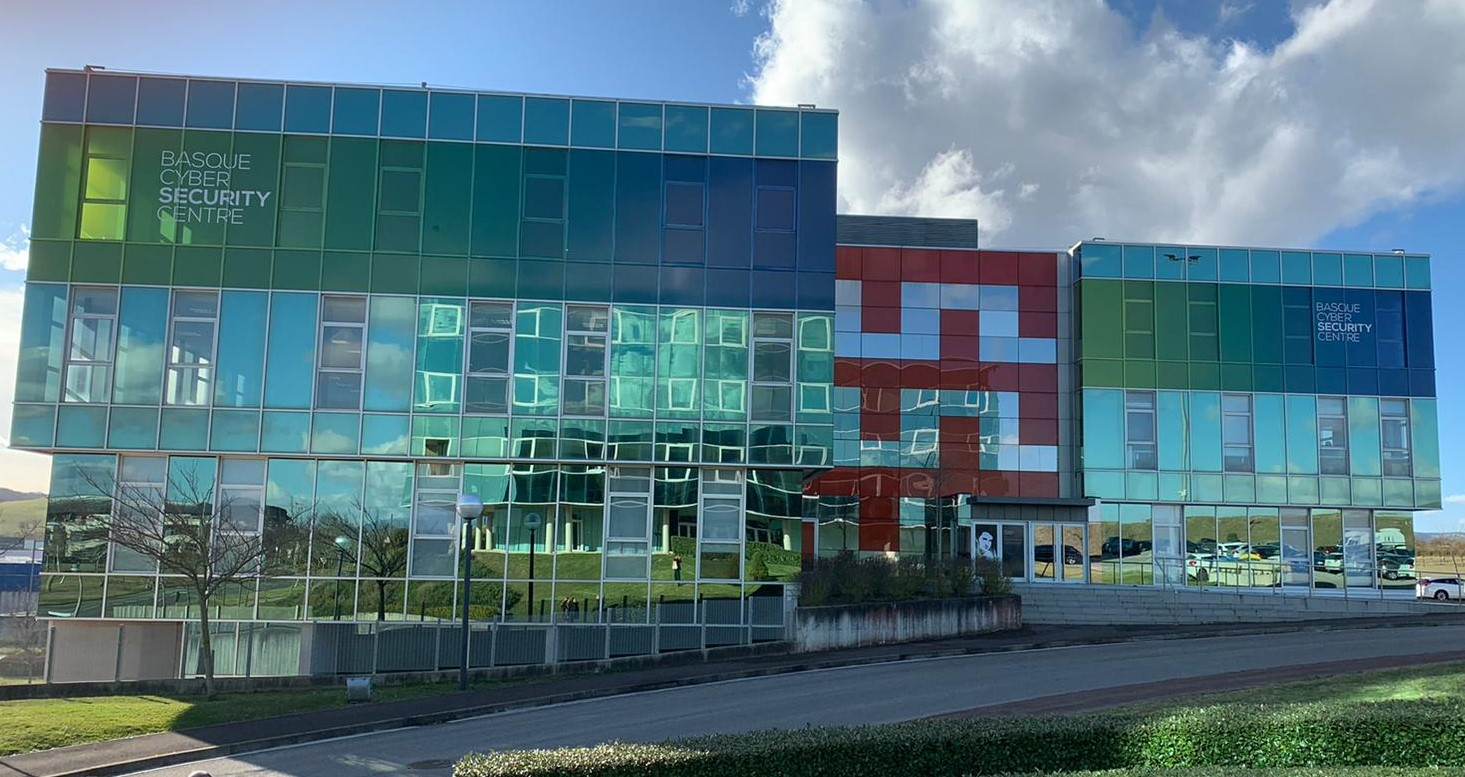

Public agency overview
- Formed: 2017
- Headquarters: Álava Technology Park - Albert Einstein, 46-3rd – Building E7, 01510 Vitoria-Gasteiz, Spain
- Parent Public agency: Department of Economic Development and Infrastructure

The Basque Cybersecurity Centre (BCSC) is the organization appointed by the Basque Government to promote cybersecurity in the Basque Country. It is made up of departments of the Basque Government (Economic Development and Infrastructures, Safety, Public Governance, and Education) and technology centres (Tecnalia, Vicomtech, Ik4-Ikerlan, and Basque Center for Applied Mathematics).

BCSC is currently a member of FIRST, a global association devoted to offering coordinated responses in the event of computer attacks, and it has achieved CERT homologation.

== Collaborations ==
BCSC takes part in collaborations with other analogous centres on an international scale:

- Member of the international cybersecurity consortium Global EPIC.
- Member of the European Cyber Security Organisation (ECSO).
- In partnership with The National Cybersecurity Institute (INCIBE) and INCIBE-CERT.
- Entity acknowledged by the European Union Agency for Cybersecurity (ENISA).

== Scope and services ==
As CSIRT team, BCSC offers the following services:

- Cybersecurity event management, offering advice on the phone and via email, both in Spanish and Basque.
- Vulnerability handling, ensuring communication among the people or firms which discover them, and software or device developers.
- Malware analysis, developing strategies for detection, protection and elimination.
- Releasing warnings about safety vulnerabilities in IT systems, to lower their risk.
- Early alert in case a risk becomes an actual threat.
- Spreading information by publishing good practice guides in the scope of cybersecurity. Also, publishing situation reports.
- Collaborating with other fast response teams, internet service providers, devices manufacturers and other entities, sharing information.
- Training for professionals, through workshops and seminars to promote learning in the field of cybersecurity.
- Awareness building for young people and companies and associations working in the industrial field, through seminars focusing on the need to implement the necessary cybersecurity measures.

Among other services, BCSC cooperates with the Basque police, monitoring public networks to mitigate cyber threats which put citizens and/or companies at risk. It also coordinates R&D&I initiatives, or the support to startups through initiative BIND 4.0.
