= Switchblade =

Type of knife

A folding switchblade

A switchblade (also known as switch knife, automatic knife, pushbutton knife, ejector knife, flick knife, gravity knife, flick blade, or spring knife) is a pocketknife with a sliding or pivoting blade contained in the handle which is extended automatically by a spring when a button, lever, or switch on the handle or bolster is activated. Virtually all switchblades incorporate a locking blade, a means of preventing the blade from being accidentally closed while in the open position. An unlocking mechanism must be activated in order to close the blade for storage.

During the 1950s, American newspapers as well as the tabloid press promoted the image of a new violent crime wave caused by young male delinquents with a switchblade or flick knife, based mostly on anecdotal evidence. In 1954, Democratic Rep. James J. Delaney of New York authored the first bill submitted to the U.S. Congress banning the manufacture and sale of switchblades, beginning a wave of legal restrictions worldwide and a subsequent decline in their popularity.

== Method of operation ==
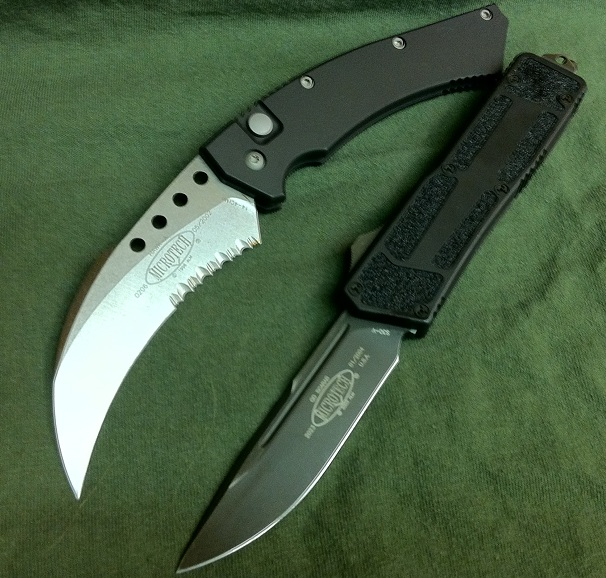
A side opening (left) and out the front (OTF) knife

=== Side-opening ===
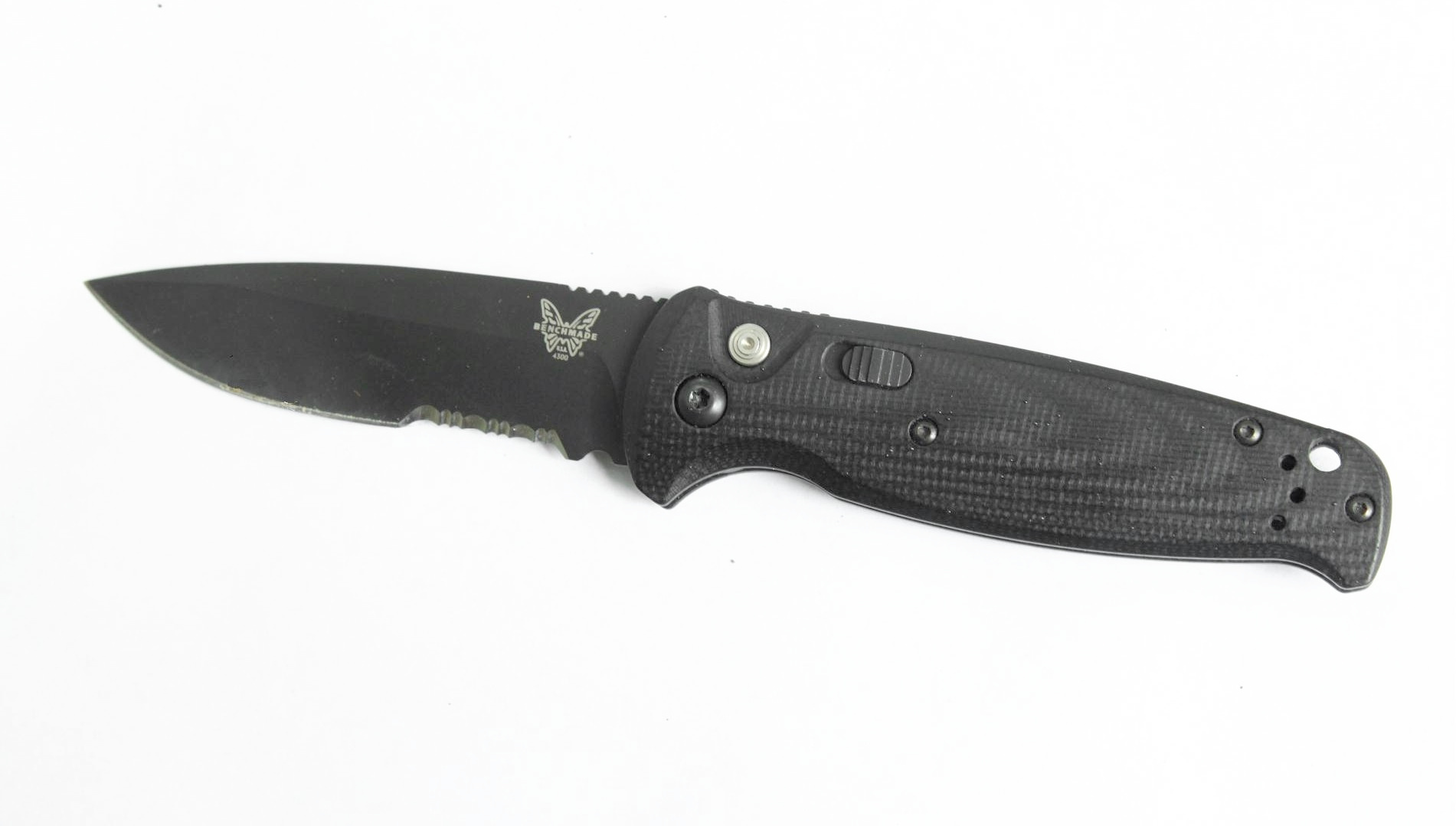
Benchmade 4300 CLA Composite Lite Auto. Auto knife push button operation with side mounted safety, reversible clip. Length 7.85 in (19.9 cm) Blade length 3.4 in (8.6 cm). Blade Material CM154.

The most common type of switchblade is the side-opening or out-the-side (OTS) knife. These resemble traditional manually operated folding knives, but feature a coil or leaf spring which powers a blade that is released when the activation button is pressed. Side-opening knives may feature a safety mechanism that prevents the accidental actuation of the blade release mechanism. Manipulation of a lever, slide button, bolster, or picklock releases the blade for closure.

=== Out the front (OTF) knives ===
==== Double action OTF knives ====
Schematic of double action out the front automatic knife

A double action out the front knife is so-called because the blade emerges from the front of the handle and the thumb stud can be moved forwards or backwards to extend or retract the knife respectively.

The knife blade (dark grey) is locked in position by a spring-loaded restraining pin (yellow and red) fitting into a notch in the blade at position 1. The two spring carriers (green) fit into the spaces on the slide (blue) and this assembly rests to the side of the blade. The right spring carrier is restrained by a tab at position 2 that fits over the end of the blade. Tension on the main spring (red zig-zag) holds the other spring carrier, slide and thumb stud (light grey) to the right.

When the thumb stud is pushed forward the slide and left spring carrier are free to travel. This increases tension on the main spring as the blade and right spring carrier are locked. A ramp on the slide impinges on the lower pin. When the pin evacuates the notch, the blade and right spring carrier are free to move. The right spring carrier moves only a short distance before it comes to rest in the slide. Momentum carries the blade further before flanges (not shown) retard its motion.

Another restraining pin at position 3 fits into a notch and locks the blade in the extended position. A tab on the left spring carrier fits into a hole in the blade at position 4 which restrains the left spring carrier. This allows reverse force on the thumb stud to increase tension in the main spring before the upper restraining pin releases and the blade and carrier can return to the closed position.

The small restraining pin at 3 is the only thing holding the blade open and is prone to failure if abused. The whole slide assembly moves only a short distance, exactly as far as the thumb stud moves. The force that causes the blade to extend or retract is equal to the force applied by the user on the thumb stud to stretch the main spring before it releases. For this reason the tip of the blade is unlikely to even break skin and is entirely incapable of causing significant injury when released though the edge of the blade may still cut as it moves as with any knife. Any object in the path of the extending blade may cause the blade to stop before it can lock in position. This is easily remedied by either pulling the blade out so that it locks or pushing it in till it locks and then redeploying.

Double-action knives have the advantages of being able to automatically retract the blade, as well as allowing the main spring to be in the "at rest" position whenever the knife is fully open or closed. However, because they have more complicated mechanisms, double-action OTFs will tend to be more expensive, have a weaker firing action, and a less-solid lockup than comparable single-action OTFs.

==== Single action OTF knives ====
Schematic of single action out the front automatic knife

A single action out the front knife operates under similar principles but will only automatically extend the blade which must then be manually retracted.

One spring post (green, left) is rigidly fixed to the handle (orange), the other spring post (green, right) is fastened to the base of the blade. The main spring (red) is under tension, but the blade cannot eject because the spring mounted button (light grey, its spring not shown) is resting in a notch in the blade. The cocking arm (blue) emerges through the base of the handle; friction with the handle holds it in place.

When the button is depressed (sideways into the handle or, as illustrated, into the page) a slot in it aligns with the blade and allows the blade to move forward. When the blade is fully extended flanges on the blade engage pins on the cocking arm retarding the blade's motion. The blade is locked in position when the rear notch of the blade allows the button to return to its rest position. Even if the button is pressed spring tension holds the knife open.

To retract the blade the button is again pressed so that its slot aligns with the blade. The cocking arm is pulled backwards which itself pulls the blade backward. When the blade is fully retracted the spring mounted button rests in the forward notch and again pops up and locks the blade in the cocked position. The cocking arm is then manually pushed forward to again sit flush with the handle.

Because the main spring is constantly acting on the blade and is extended by a far greater amount and is cocked by the whole hand and arm rather than by thumb the force it can exert on the blade is greater than with a double action knife. This allows the tip of the blade to break skin when deployed and possibly penetrate a few millimeters (or hundredths of an inch) past it or to pass through light clothing. While still not a strong design, because it is more firmly attached a quality single action out, the front blade displays less wobble and play than its comparable quality double action counterpart.

== Spring-assist knife vis-à-vis switchblade ==
While operationally identical (in terms of one-handed opening), the "spring-assist" or "assisted opening" knife is not a switchblade or automatic knife. A switchblade opens its blade from the handle automatically to the fully locked and open position with the single press of a button, lever, or switch that is remotely mounted in the knife handle or bolster. In contrast, a spring-assist design uses either 1) manual pressure upon a protrusion on the blade itself or 2) movement of a lever or switch directly linked to the blade to initiate partial opening of the blade, at which point an internal spring propels the blade into the fully open, locked position. By this definition, some out-the-front automatics could be considered spring-assisted knives rather than switchblades, and some merchants in the United States sold them as such during periods of switchblade illegality.

Despite this difference in function, the criminal codes of many nations treat the assisted opening knife, like the switchblade, as a prohibited weapon. In the US, persons have occasionally been arrested or prosecuted by state law enforcement authorities for carrying assisted-opening knives defined as an illegal switchblade. An attempt to criminalize the sale of spring-assisted knives by federal law enforcement was forestalled by a US 2009 amendment (Amendment 1447) to 15 U.S.C. §1244. This amendment provides that the Switchblade Knife Act shall not apply to spring-assist or assisted-opening knives (i.e. knives with closure-biased springs that require physical force applied to the blade to assist in opening the knife).

== Legislation ==
=== Austria ===
Beginning with the Austrian Arms Act of 1996 switchblades, like all other knives, are generally legal to buy, import, possess or carry, regardless of blade length or opening or locking mechanism. The only exception are minors (defined as persons under the age of 18) and people who have been expressly banned from owning and carrying any weapon (Waffenverbot): both groups may only possess knives which are not considered "weapons" under the Arms Act, defined as "objects that by their very nature are intended to reduce or eliminate the defensive ability of a person through direct impact". Switchblades usually fall under that definition.

In Austria the regulatory laws of individual states and the Assembly Act prohibit switchblades and other knives from being carried into a public building, school, public assembly, or public event.

=== Australia ===
In Australia, switchblades are banned by the Customs (Prohibited Imports) Regulations as a Prohibited Import. Australian customs refer to the automatic knife or switchblade as a flick knife. Australian law defines a flick knife as a knife that has a blade which opens automatically by gravity, by centrifugal force, or by any pressure applied to a button, spring or device in or attached to the handle of the knife, a definition that would cover not only switchblades and automatic-opening knives, but also gravity knives and balisongs.

At a state and local level, most jurisdictions declare flick knives to be prohibited weapons in their respective acts, codes and regulations. Persons residing in states that do not have specific weapons legislation covering switchblades (such as Tasmania) are still covered by Federal Customs legislation, but in conditions where the state has no legislation against such items, an exemption may be applied for and received if approved by the chief supervisory officer of the police service in that state.

Some states which have specific legislation against switchblades allow individuals to apply for an exemption from this legislation if they have a legitimate reason. For example, in the state of Victoria, a member of a bona fide knife-collectors' association, who is not a prohibited person (per the Firearms Act 1996), and meets other guidelines and conditions may apply to the Chief Commissioner of Police for a Prohibited Weapons Exemption to possess, carry, or otherwise own such a knife. This exemption may then, in turn, be used to apply to the Australian Customs Service for an import permit.

=== Belgium ===
Article 3, §1 of the 2006 Weapons Act lists the switchblade or automatic knife (couteaux à cran d'arrêt et à lame jaillissante) as a prohibited weapon. In Belgium, the police and local jurisdictions are also allowed to prohibit the carrying or possession of a wide variety of knives, which are not explicitly banned by law, if the owner cannot establish a legitimate reason (motif légitime) for having that knife, particularly in urban areas or at public events.

=== Canada ===
Under Part III of the Criminal Code a knife that has a blade that opens automatically by gravity or centrifugal force or by hand pressure applied to a button, spring or other device in or attached to the handle of the knife, is illegal to possess, import, sell, buy, trade, or carry on one's person. These are prohibited weapons (armes défendues). While certain businesses can be granted a licence to acquire and possess prohibited weapons such as switchblades for use as props in movie productions, these exemptions do not apply to individuals.

=== Czech Republic ===
It is legal to carry and possess switchblades or automatic knives in the Czech Republic.

=== Denmark ===
Any type of automatic-opening knife or bladed tool that can be opened using just one hand (this includes any one-handed knife that has been deactivated by removing its opening mechanism) is illegal to own or possess. Multi-tools featuring one-hand opening blades are also illegal to own or possess. Manually opened one-handed knives are legal.

=== Finland ===
In Finland switchblade or automatic knives are legal to purchase or possess. All knives are considered as dangerous weapons and it is forbidden to carry any knife without a proper cause. The law forbids carrying or importing any automatic knife that has the blade completely hidden like OTF switchblades. The restriction does not apply to importing historically significant knives or those with significant artistic value. The law requires that switchblades be cased and secured while being transported.

=== France ===
French law defines switchblades as dangerous weapons, which may not be carried on one's person. If carried in a vehicle, such knives must be placed in a secure, locked compartment not accessible to the vehicle occupants. In addition, French law provides that authorities may classify any knife as a prohibited item depending upon circumstances and the discretion of the police or judicial authorities.

=== Germany ===
The switchblade is known in Germany as the Springmesser (also called a Sprenger or Springer). All large side-opening switchblade knives (blade longer than 8.5 cm (3.3 in)), OTF switchblades, balisongs or butterfly knives (blade longer than 4 cm (1.6 in)), and gravity knives are illegal to own, import or export under German law. Side-opening switchblade knives with single-edged blades not longer than 8.5 cm (3.3 in) and incorporating a continuous spine are legal to own. Legal switchblades may be carried both open and concealed on one's person if there is a justified need for it ("berechtigtes Bedürfnis") or if the weapon cannot be accessed with less than 3 moves ("Transport in verschlossenem Behältnis"). Other laws or regulations may still prohibit the carrying of otherwise legal automatic or switchblade knives, particularly in certain situations or places (gatherings on public ground, check-in areas of airports).

=== Hungary ===
According to decree 175/2003. (X. 28.) of the Hungarian government a közbiztonságra különösen veszélyes eszközökről (about the instruments particularly hazardous to public safety), it is prohibited to possess a switchblade in public places or private places open to the public – that includes the inside of vehicles present there – and on public transport vehicles, except for filmmaking and theatrical performances. Members of the Hungarian Army, law enforcement, national security agencies and armed forces stationed in Hungary are exempt from this limitation together with those who are authorised to carry such instruments by legislation. Sale of a switchblade is authorised only to the persons and organizations above. Customs clearance of switchblades may not be performed for private individuals such as tourists.

=== Hong Kong ===
According to the Weapons Ordinance (Cap. 217), any person who has possession of any prohibited items (including Gravity Knife and Flick Knife) commits an offence.

=== Ireland ===
Section 9 of the Firearms and Offensive Weapons Act 1990 makes it an offence to carry a "flick knife" in any public space without lawful authority or reasonable excuse. A summary conviction is punishable with either a €1000 fine, up to 12 months imprisonment or both but if indictable the penalty can be up to five years in prison. The Act, which classifies a flick knife as an offensive weapon, also prohibits the manufacture, importation, sale, hire or loan of these knives. Conviction for any of these offences carries a sentence of up to seven years imprisonment.

=== Italy ===
In Italy, the switchblade or automatic opening knife (coltello a scatto) is defined by law as an offensive weapon (arma bianca) rather than a tool. A firearms license (porto d'armi) or a police clearance (nulla osta) are required to legally purchase one. Such knives may not be transported outside of one's property without a valid reason (self-defense is not) and it is always illegal to carry one in a ready to use condition, neither concealed nor unconcealed. The Italian Ministry of Interior has warned that switchblade knives will be considered offensive weapons in their own right.

=== Japan ===
In Japan any switchblade over 5.6 centimetres (2.2 in) in blade length requires permission from the prefectural public safety commission in order to possess at home. However, switchblades and assisted open knives are prohibited from carry under any circumstances.

=== Lithuania ===
According to Lithuanian law it is illegal to carry or possess a switchblade if it meets one of the following criteria: the blade is longer than 8.5 cm (3.3 in); the width in the middle of the blade is less than 14% of its total length; the blade is double sided.

=== Mexico ===
It is legal to carry and possess switchblades in Mexico.

=== Netherlands ===
As of 2012, it is prohibited to own or possess, whether kept at home or not, any stilettos, switchblades, folding knives with more than one cutting edge, and throwing knives.

=== New Zealand ===
The Customs Import Prohibition Order 2008 prohibits the importation of "any knife having a blade that opens automatically by hand pressure applied to a button, spring or other device in or attached to the handle of the knife (sometimes known as a 'flick-knife' or 'flick gun')". The Summary Offences Act 1981 and the Crimes Act 1961 section 202A(4)(a) make it an offence to possess any weapon in a public place without reasonable excuse.

=== Norway ===
Switchblades or automatic knives (springkniver) may not be acquired, possessed, or carried in Norway "without justifiable purpose" and also assuming they "appear as products of violence".

=== Poland ===
Knives, including switchblades, although regarded as dangerous tools, are not considered weapons under Polish law, except for blades hidden in umbrellas, canes, etc. It is legal to sell, buy, trade and possess a switchblade, and Polish law does not prohibit carrying a knife in a public place. However, certain prohibitions may apply during mass events.

=== Russia ===
In Russia, switchblades (rus. автоматический нож, выкидной нож, пружинный нож) are illegal only if their blade's length is more than 9 cm (3.5 in) – this is an illegal weapon, and there is a fine 500–2000 Russian rubles (about $8–30) and withdrawing of the knife only for carrying it (article 20.8 of Offences Code of Russia), but not for illegal purchasing and possession (keeping at home or somewhere else). Only self-making and selling white arms (rus. холодное оружие) is a crime in Russia (these two crimes are punished by: part 4 article 222 and part 4 article 223 of Russian Criminal Code). If the blade is shorter than 9 centimetres, anyone (even if people younger than 18 years old, having a criminal history or mental illness) can buy, own and concealed carry (open carry of any weapon or things that look like weapon at human settlements is forbidden in Russia; with the exception for policemen) such a switchblade without any license. But even in this case, it is recommended that people carry on their person an official certificate (type approval) (which is usually in a box with a purchased knife), which proves that it is not a melee weapon and not restricted to carry, in which case even knives longer than 9 cm are sometimes approved.

=== Singapore ===
The importation and possession of switchblades are illegal in Singapore. It may not be also listed or sold in auctions in Singapore.

=== Slovenia ===
Switchblades are specifically prohibited under Slovenian law.

=== Slovakia ===
It is legal to carry and possess switchblade or automatic knives with no restriction to the length of the blade.

=== South Africa ===
In South Africa, little to no laws exist on the possession, sale, manufacture, and carrying of weapons, other than firearms. Switchblades are legal for possession, sale, manufacture, and carrying.

=== South Korea ===
In South Korea, any knife that automatically opens wider than 45 degrees with the push of a button and has a blade that is longer than 5.5 cm (2.2 in) is subject to registration. In order to register the knife and legally possess it, one must be older than 20, have no previous criminal offences and be healthy both physically and psychologically. The registration process is carried out at nearby police stations. However, unless the owner of the knife has a hunting license, carrying the knife in public is generally prohibited.

=== Spain ===
Manufacture, importation, trade, use and possession of switchblade knives are prohibited in Spain.

=== Sweden ===
In Sweden, the possession of any knife in a public place, at school, or public roads is prohibited. Exceptions are made for those who carry knives for professional or otherwise justified reasons. Switchblades may not be possessed by individuals under 21 years of age.

=== Switzerland ===
Knives whose blade can be opened with an automatic mechanism that can be operated with one hand are illegal to acquire (except with a special permit) in Switzerland under the Federal Weapons Act. Butterfly knives, throwing knives and daggers with a symmetrical blade are banned likewise. Violations are punishable with imprisonment of up to three years or a fiscal penalty, as provided for by article 33 of the same act.

=== Turkey ===
Switchblades are illegal to buy, sell and carry in Turkey per the corresponding law 6136 (4) which includes an incarceration sentence of up to 1 year. However, due to the widespread use of switchblades and butterfly knives in the country, imprisoning is very rare and sentences are often converted to a fine when it is the only violation.

=== Ukraine ===
Under Article 263 of the Criminal Code, switchblades are not specifically prohibited; however, any knife definable as a 'dagger' may not be manufactured, sold, repaired for sale, nor carried on one's person without a valid permit.

=== United Kingdom ===
On 12 May 1958, Parliament passed the Restriction of Offensive Weapons Act 1959, which banned the manufacture, sale or offer to sell or hire any type of automatic-opening or switchblade knife. The law came in response to their perceived use by juvenile delinquents and gangs and associated media coverage, as well as by the 1958 passage of the Switchblade Knife Act in the United States. Indeed, much of the language in the Restriction of Offensive Weapons Act 1959 appears to be taken directly from the American law.

In 2019, parliamentary amendments to Section 43, 44, and 46 of The Restriction of Offensive Weapons Act 1959 make it illegal to own, possess, sell or transfer a switchblade or flick knife within the United Kingdom, including possession at home. According to UK government websites, assisted-opening knives are included in the amended and expanded definition of a prohibited 'flick knife'.

=== United States ===
==== Federal law ====
The Switchblade Knife Act (Pub. L. 85–623, 72 Stat. 562, aka SWA, enacted on August 12, 1958, and codified in 15 U.S.C. §§ 1241–1245) prohibits the manufacture, importation, distribution, transportation, and sale of switchblade knives in commercial transactions substantially affecting interstate commerce between any state, territory, possession of the United States, or the District of Columbia, and any place outside that state, territory, U.S. possession, or the District of Columbia. The Act also prohibits possession of such knives on federal or Indian lands or on lands subject to federal jurisdiction. The federal SWA does not prohibit the ownership or carrying of automatic knives or switchblades inside state lines while not on federal property, nor does it prohibit the acquisition or disposition of such knives in an intrastate (in-state) transaction. Finally, the law does not prohibit interstate knife sales or transactions that are either noncommercial in nature, or which do not substantially affect interstate commerce (as defined by recent decisions of the U.S. Supreme Court).

U.S. Code Title 15, Sect. 1241 defines switchblade knives as any knives which open "1) by hand pressure applied to a button or other device in the handle of the knife, or any knife having a blade which opens automatically; (2) by operation of inertia, gravity, or both". The Act also prohibits the manufacture, sale, or possession of switchblade knives on any Federal lands, Native American reservations, military bases, and Federal maritime or territorial jurisdictions including the District of Columbia, Puerto Rico, and other territories. The act was amended in 1986 to also prohibit the importation, sale, manufacture, or possession of ballistic knives in interstate commerce.

U.S.C. 1716 prohibits the mailing or transport of switchblades or automatic knives through the U.S. mails (U.S. Postal Service), with a few designated exceptions. The act provides for a fine and/or imprisonment of not more than one year. 18 U.S.C. § 1716(g)(2) provides:

7. All knives having a blade which opens automatically (1) by hand pressure applied to a button or other device in the handle of the knife, or (2) by operation of inertia, gravity, or both, are nonmailable and shall not be deposited in or carried by the mails or delivered by any officer or employee of the Postal Service. Such knives may be conveyed in the mails, under such regulations as the Postal Service shall prescribe —
  1. to civilian or Armed Forces supply or procurement officers and employees of the Federal Government ordering, procuring, or purchasing such knives in connection with the activities of the Federal Government;
  2. to supply or procurement officers of the National Guard, the Air National guard, or militia of a state, territory or the District of Columbia ordering, procuring, or purchasing such knives in the connection with the activities of such organization;
  3. to supply or procurement officers or employees of the municipal government of the District of Columbia or the government of any State or Territory, or any county, city or other political subdivision of a State or Territory; procuring or purchasing such knives in connection with the activities of such government.
  4. to manufacturers of such knives or bona fide dealers therein in connection with any shipment made pursuant of an order from any person designated in paragraphs (1), (2), and (3).

15 U.S.C. § 1244 provides that the federal Switchblade Knife Act does not apply to: 1) any common carrier or contract carrier, with respect to any switchblade knife shipped, transported, or delivered for shipment in interstate commerce in the ordinary course of business; 2) the manufacture, sale, transportation, distribution, possession, or introduction into interstate commerce of switchblade knives pursuant to contract with the Armed Forces; 3) to the Armed Forces or any member or employee thereof acting in the performance of his duty; 4) the possession and transportation upon his person of any switchblade knife with a blade 3 in (7.6 cm) or less in length by any individual who has only one arm, and 5) a knife "that contains a spring, detent, or other mechanism designed to create a bias toward closure of the blade and that requires exertion applied to the blade by hand, wrist, or arm to overcome the bias toward closure to assist in opening the knife".

In October, 2026, the Fifth Circuit Court of Appeals ruled that the Federal Switchblade Act (FSA)'s restrictions on switchblade knives is unconstitutional under the Second Amendment, citing New York State Rifle & Pistol Association, Inc. v. Bruen as precedent.

==== State laws ====
In addition to federal law, some U.S. states have laws restricting or prohibiting automatic knives or switchblades, sometimes as part of a catchall category of deadly weapons or prohibited weapons. A few states, among them Delaware, Hawaii, New Jersey, New Mexico, and New York, prohibit sale, transfer, ownership or possession of automatic knives or switchblades as deadly or prohibited weapons, while others such as New Hampshire and Arizona have no restrictions on sale, ownership, possession, or carry (with some location-specific exceptions). Other states allow purchase, possession, and carrying on one's person to a limited degree, sometimes with restrictions on blade length or location.

The negative public reputation of the switchblade as the tool of the juvenile delinquent, derived from sensational media coverage of the 1950s, was enshrined in many states' criminal codes, and some of these laws persist to this day. Thus in some states, the possession or carrying of an automatic-opening knife or switchblade may become illegal based solely on its design or aesthetic appearance, or simply its use as a weapon in a given circumstance. For example, switchblade knives with blade shapes originally designed for the purpose of stabbing or thrusting, such as the dirk, dagger, poignard, or stiletto are automatically considered to be 'deadly weapons' (i.e. knives designed or specially adapted for use as a weapon to inflict death or serious bodily injury).

Over the years, state judicial decisions have expanded the original reach of switchblade laws, either by reclassifying single-edged automatic pocket knives with short, general-purpose blades as illegal 'dirks or daggers', or by re-defining otherwise legal manually operated lock-blade pocket knives as a prohibited gravity knife, flick knife, or switchblade. Persons who used knives deemed prohibited as in their work or for self-defense, or who could not afford adequate legal representation, particularly racial minorities, have been disproportionately affected by the capricious enforcement of such laws.

In response to complaints raised about the constitutionality and inconsistent application of existing statutes to modern knife designs, several states such as Alaska, Arkansas, Indiana, Kansas, Michigan, Missouri, Montana, Tennessee, Texas, Virginia, West Virginia, and Wisconsin have repealed older laws against possession or purchase of switchblade or automatic knives. Five states still prohibit anyone from selling, purchasing, owning or carrying a switchblade.

In August 2024, the Massachusetts Supreme Judicial Court relied on the 2022 U.S. Supreme Court decision New York State Rifle & Pistol Association, Inc. v. Bruen when it struck down a 1957 ban on switchblade knives in the state, on the grounds there were no similar bans at the time of the writing of the Second and Fourteenth Amendments. This may mean other switchblade laws at the federal and state level will be ruled unconstitutional.

U.S. state laws regarding possession, concealed and non-concealed carry by adult age 21 or older
State	Possession/Display/Purchase/Sale	Carry in Public (on Person)
Alabama	Legal – State Code: Section 13A-11	Legal – Only Bowie knives or knives of "like kind or description" are restricted from carry in a vehicle or concealed about the person. or outside of one's own property without good reason.
Alaska	Legal – became legal on September 16, 2013 –	Legal – became legal on September 16, 2013 -
Arizona	Legal – S.B. 1108 Changes to Arizona Code: 13-3102, 13-3105, and 13-3112	Legal – S.B. 1108 Changes to Arizona Code: 13-3102, 13-3105, and 13-3112. Knives prohibited in certain locations (schools, airports, hydroelectric facilities, nuclear facilities, polling places, and on the grounds of organized public events and gatherings. Persons under 21 may not carry a switchblade definable as a deadly weapon concealed on their person
Arkansas	Legal – State Code: 5-73-120	Legal – Legal to carry concealed on one's person or in a vehicle in most circumstances unless with intent to harm.
California	Limited – Illegal to sell, transfer or manufacture, may possess at home only. State Code: California Penal Code 17235 and Penal Code 21510	Limited – Illegal to carry openly or concealed on one's person, or in a motor vehicle stationed in a public place or in a place open to public unless blade is under 2 in (5.1 cm) Note: some city criminal codes, such as Oakland, are more restrictive and prohibit all switchblades regardless of blade length. See OMC 9-36.040
Colorado	Legal* – Changed by SB17-008 (effective in August 2017); *However, the cities of Denver, Aurora, Boulder, Colorado Springs and Lakewood still ban the sale, display, possession or carrying of switchblades and gravity knives.	Limited – Open carry legal, except in Denver, Aurora, Boulder, Colorado Springs and Lakewood. Illegal to carry any knife concealed (including switchblade) having a blade length over 3.5 in (8.9 cm).
Connecticut	Legal – State Code: Sec. 53-206	Limited – Possession in vehicle prohibited; Illegal unless carried by person with a valid hunting, fishing, or trapping license while actively hunting, fishing or trapping; when moving one's possessions; when being transported for repair; when being used in an authorized historic reenactment; or if the blade of the switchblade is under 1.5 in (3.8 cm) – Knives Defined As Dangerous Weapons
Delaware	Illegal – State Code: Crimes & Criminal Procedure – Chapter 11 Section 1446	Illegal – State Code: Chapter 11 Section 1446
District of Columbia	Illegal – § 22–4514	Illegal – § 22-4504
Florida	Legal – State Code: 790.001	Legal – State Code: 790.001
Georgia	Legal – O.C.G.A. § 16-11-126	Limited – legal if carried openly and legal if carried concealed when blade is less than 5 in (13 cm). Concealed carry of a blade greater than 5 in (13 cm) requires a "Weapons Carry License" O.C.G.A. § 16-11-126
Hawaii	legal – State Code: §134-52	legal – State Code: §134-51
Idaho	Legal – State Code: 18-3302	Limited – Concealed carry allowed if not otherwise prohibited by local ordinance, but prohibited if possessor is intoxicated, exhibits an 'intent to assault another', or exhibits any deadly or dangerous weapon in a rude, angry or threatening manner – State Code: 18-3302
Illinois	Limited – Allowed with valid Firearm Owner's Identification Card. -State Code:720 ILCS 5/24-1	Limited – Allowed with valid Firearm Owner's Identification Card. -State Code:720 ILCS 5/24-1
Indiana	Legal (except on school property) – State Code: IC 35-47-5	Legal (except on school property) –
Iowa	Legal – State Code: Crime Control and Criminal Acts – Definitions. 702.7	Limited – illegal if carried concealed without "Iowa Permit to Carry Weapons", legal to carry openly – Iowa Department of Public Safety SF2379 Frequently Asked Questions – State Code: 724.4
Kansas	Legal – Session of 2013 amending K.S.A. 2012 Supp. 21-6301	Legal – Session of 2013 amending K.S.A. 2012 Supp. 21-6302
Kentucky	Legal – State Code: 500.080 Definitions for Kentucky Penal Code State Code: 527.020	Limited – concealed carry, even on one's own property, allowed only with "concealed deadly weapons permit" – State Code: 527.020
Louisiana	Legal – Became Legal on August 1, 2018	Illegal- illegal to intentionally conceal a switchblade on one's person. R.S. 14:95
Maine	Legal – No restrictions	
Maryland	Legal – State Code:§ 4-105	Limited – legal to carry openly; illegal if carried concealed unless holder has a license to carry a handgun State Code: § 4-101 (a).(5).(ii) – definition § 4-101 (c).(1-2)
Massachusetts	Legal – Mass. Gen. Law Ch. 269 § 10	Legal under 2024 MSJC ruling; before that, legal if length of blade does not exceed 1.5", illegal otherwise – Mass. Gen. Law Ch. 269 § 10
Michigan	Legal – State Code: 750.226a.	Legal – State Code: 750.226a. repealed under Michigan Switchblade Ban Repeal bill, SB 245 went into effect 90 days after signing on October 10, 2017
Minnesota	Limited – Illegal unless allowed under exceptions made for collectors and/or possession as curios or antiques – State Code: Section 609.66 Subdivision 1 State Code: Section 609.02 Subdivision 6	Illegal – State Code: Section 609.66 Subdivision 1 State Code: Section 609.02 Subdivision 6
Mississippi	Legal – State Code: Crimes Section § 97-37-1	Limited – Illegal if carried concealed or when intoxicated – State Code: Crimes Section § 97-37-1
Missouri	Legal – Senate Bill 489 (2012), signed by Governor on 10 July 2012 with emergency clause.	Legal – as long as possession is not against federal law – Senate Bill 489 (2012), signed by Governor on 10 July 2012 with emergency clause.
Montana	Legal – State Code: HB 155 repeal of Section 45-8-331	Legal –State Code HB 251 amendment of Section 45-8-315
Nebraska	Legal – State Code: Crimes and Punishments. 28-1201	Limited – Illegal if carried concealed – State Code: Crimes and Punishments. 28-1201
Nevada	Legal – State Code: NRS 202.355	Legal – Nevada Knife Law Reform Bill, SB 176 (effective July 1, 2015) – State Code: NRS 202.350 paragraph 8(h), State Code: NRS 202.355
New Hampshire	Legal – HB 1665-FN (2010)	Legal – HB 1665-FN (2010)
New Jersey	Limited – Ownership, display, or possession unlawful unless possessor has an "explainable lawful purpose" for possession and then only if possessor used knife for lawful purpose, and not under circumstances "not manifestly appropriate for such lawful use[s]".	Illegal – Carrying openly or concealed illegal except for members of armed forces, National Guard, or law enforcement officials authorized to carry such weapons
New Mexico	Illegal – State Code: Criminal Offenses – 30-1-12	Illegal – State Code: Criminal Offenses – 30-1-12
New York	Limited – Possession illegal except for holders of valid hunting, fishing, or fur-trapping licenses – State Code: Penal Law Section 265.01, 265.20(6)	Limited – Carrying open or concealed illegal except for holders of valid hunting, fishing, or fur-trapping license actually engaging in said activity – State Code: Penal Law Section 265.01, 265.20(6) Note: several NY cities and the New York Transit Authority have additional criminal codes restricting or prohibiting the carrying of automatic knives.
North Carolina	Legal – Ownership or possession legal except "on campus or other educational property", as defined in NC General Statutes Chap. 14, Article 35, §14-269.2	Limited – Concealed carry illegal except when on one's own property; open carry legal unless with the intent "to terrify or alarm the public", or if on a school campus, state property, or into a Courthouse or at a parade, funeral procession, picket line, or demonstration upon any private health care facility. – NC General Statutes Chapter 14, Article 35, §14-269;
North Dakota	Legal – State Code: Criminal Code – Weapons – 62.1-04-02	Legal – Concealed carry permitted only with dangerous weapons permit – State Code: Criminal Code – Weapons – 62.1-04-02
Ohio	Legal – State Code: § 2923.12	Legal – SB 140 (effective April 12, 2021) changes the definition of "deadly weapon" to explicitly exclude knives not actually used as weapons, thereby legalizing the open or concealed carry of any knife. SB 156 (effective September 13, 2022) protects knives under the state arms preemption law, prohibiting municipalities from enacting or enforcing regulations on knives. State Code: § 9.68 State Code: § 2923.12
Oklahoma	Legal – State Code: §21-1272.	Legal – HB 1911 (effective November 1, 2015) amends Title 21 O.S. § 1272 (unlawful carry).
Oregon	Legal – State Code: 166.240	Limited – Illegal if carried concealed State Code: 166.240
Pennsylvania	Legal – Legal as of January 2, 2023 [House Bill 1929 amendment to State Code: Pa. C.S.A. 18.908]	Limited – Carry legal except "concealed carry of an automatic knife "…with the intent therewith unlawfully and maliciously to do injury to any other person…" remains illegal in Pennsylvania."State Code: Pa. C.S.A. 18.907]
Puerto Rico	Illegal – Title 15, Ch. 29, Sec. 1243 United States Code	Illegal – Title 15, Ch. 29, Sec. 1243 United States Code
Rhode Island	Legal – State Code: 11-47-42	Limited – legal to carry concealed unless blade is a dagger, dirk, or stiletto or concealed while containing a blade length of over 3 in (7.6 cm) State Code: 11-47-42
South Carolina	Legal – State Code: 16-23-460	Legal – State Code: 16-23-460
South Dakota	Legal – State Code: 22-14-19	Legal – State Code: 22-14-19 Note: The City of Sioux Falls prohibits concealed carry of switchblades definable as a dirk, dagger, or other dangerous or deadly weapon or any instrument or device which when used is likely to produce death or great bodily harm, a definition which in practice appears to cover all switchblade knives.
Tennessee	Legal – State Code: 39-17-1302 (c) (1)	Legal – Effective July 1, 2014 – State Code: 39-17-1302
Texas	Legal – Effective 9/1/13 – HB 1862	Limited – Effective September 1, 2013 – Legal for adults and minors to carry a switchblade (or any knife) with a blade length of less than 5.5 in (14 cm) (measuring the non-handle portion) HB 1862. Switchblades with blades 5.5 in (14 cm) or more are prohibited in certain locations listed in the Texas Penal Code.
U.S. Virgin Islands	Illegal – Title 14 Chapter 119 § 2251 V.I.C.	Illegal – Title 14 Chapter 119 § 2251 V.I.C.
Utah	Legal – State Code: Offenses Against Public Health and Safety – 76-10-504	Limited – Allowed if not concealed; concealed carry allowed with permit or license – State Code: Offenses Against Public Health and Safety – 76-10-504
Vermont	Legal – State Code: Ch. 85 Weapons – T.13-4003	Legal – As long as blade is less than 3 in (7.6 cm) – State Code: Ch. 85 Weapons – T.13-4003
Virginia	Legal – possession and sale legal as of 1 July 2022 per recent legislation.	Legal as of 1 July 2023, except for those with double-edged blades.
Washington	Illegal – Only legal for possession by on/off-duty police officers and paramedics State Code: RCW 9.41.250 HB 2346	Illegal – State Code: RCW 9.41.250 HB 2346
West Virginia	Legal – State Code: §61-7-2	Limited – Legal to carry concealed if 21 years of age or older. Illegal if carried concealed by a person under 21 years of age without a state license. – State Code: §61-7-2 W. Va. Code § 61-7-7 (2016)
Wisconsin	Legal – For adults not convicted of a felony. – State Code: 941.24	Legal – Legal unless possessed or carried by a felon or on government property and other weapon-free zones. – State Code: 941.24
Wyoming	Legal – State Code: Statutes 6-8-104	Limited – Illegal to carry switchblade definable as dangerous weapon concealed unless carrier meets eligibility requirements for a WY concealed carry permit. – State Code: Statutes 6-8-104

==== City and county ordinances ====
Unless preempted by state law, various county, city, or other local jurisdictions may also have their own codes or ordinances further restricting or prohibiting switchblade possession or use, for example Sioux Falls, South Dakota, or Oakland, California.

== History ==
Switchblades date from the mid-18th century. The development of the first automatic knife was made possible by the invention of small tempered springs by the clockmaker Benjamin Huntsman in 1742.

The first spring-fired switchblade that can be authenticated appeared in the late 1700s, probably constructed by a craftsman in Italy. After 1816, no automatic knives were produced in Italy for 50 years due to laws passed by the Austro-Hungarian Empire. By 1900, Italy had resumed production of automatic knives of the stiletto pattern, all hand-crafted by individual cutlers or small knife forges. Most of these knifemakers were concentrated in the towns of Maniago, Frosolone, Campobasso, and Scarperia.

Unknown artisans developed an automatic folding spike bayonet for use on flintlock pistols and coach guns. Examples of steel automatic folding knives from Sheffield in England have crown markings that date to 1840. Cutlery makers such as Tillotson, A. Davey, Beever, Hobson, Ibbotson and others produced automatic-opening knives. Some have simple iron bolsters and wooden handles, while others feature ornate, embossed silver alloy bolsters and stag handles. English-made knives often incorporate a "pen release" instead of a central handle button, whereby the main spring activated larger blade is released by pressing down on the closed smaller pen blade.

In France, 19th-century folding knives marked Châtellerault were available in both automatic and manually opened versions in several sizes and lengths. Châtellerault switchblades have recognizable features such as S-shaped cross guards, picklock type mechanisms and engraved decorative pearl and ivory handles. In Spain, Admiral D'Estaing is attributed with a type of folding naval dirk that doubled as an eating utensil. In closed (folded) position, the blade tip would extend beyond the handle to be used at the dining table. It could be spring activated to full length if needed as a side arm, by pressing a lever instead of a handle button. By 1850, at least one American company offered a .22 rimfire single-shot pistol equipped with a spring-operated knife. After the American Civil War (1865), knife production became industrialized. The oldest American made mass-production automatic knife is the Korn Patent Knife, which used a rocking bolster release.

The advent of mass production methods enabled folding knives with multiple components to be produced in large numbers at lower cost. By 1890, US knife sales of all types were on the increase, buoyed by catalog mail order sales as well as mass marketing campaigns utilizing advertisements in periodicals and newspapers. In consequence, knife manufacturers began marketing new and much more affordable automatic knives to the general public. In Europe as well as the United States, automatic knife sales were never more than a fraction of sales generated by conventional folding knives, yet the type enjoyed consistent if modest sales from year to year.

In 1892, George Schrade, a toolmaker and machinist from New York City developed and patented the first of several practical automatic knife designs. The following year, Schrade founded the New York Press Button Knife Company to manufacture his switchblade knife pattern, which had a unique release button mounted in the knife bolster. Schrade's company operated out of a small workshop in New York City and employed about a dozen workmen.

=== 1900–1945 ===
Swordmakers in Toledo, Spain, developed a market in the 1920s for gold plated automatic leverlock knives with pearl handles and enamel inlaid blades. Italian knifemakers had their own style of knives including both pushbutton and leverlock styles, some bearing design characteristics similar to the early French Châtellerault knife. Prior to World War II, hand crafted automatic knives marked Campobasso or Frosolone were often called Flat Guards because of the two-piece top bolster design. Some Italian switchblades incorporated a bayonet-type blade equipped with a blade lock release activated by prying up a locking flange at the hinge end, and were known as picklock models. These knives were later supplanted by newer designs which incorporated the blade lock release into a tilting bolster.

In Italy, increased production of automatic knives resulted from the actions of German businessman Albert Marx, who owned two cutlery manufacturing concerns in Solingen, Germany. After a trip to Maniago in 1907, Marx was convinced of the appeal of Italian style automatic knives, and duly took note of attempts by Maniago knifemakers to increase productivity using powered cutting tools. Marx promptly introduced the Solingen methods of semi-mass production to the Maniago knife industry, increasing output and lowering individual costs. While Italian automatic knives would remain hand-assembled and to some extent hand-crafted products, Marx's innovations did increase production, enabling exports to other parts of Italy and eventually throughout Europe and abroad. Over time, Maniago became the central hub of automatic knife production in Italy.

In the United States, commercial development of the switchblade knife was primarily dominated by the inventions of George Schrade and his New York Press Button Knife Company, though W.R. Case, Union Cutlery, Camillus Cutlery, and other U.S. knife manufacturers also marketed automatic knives of their own design. Most of Schrade's switchblade patterns were automatic versions of utilitarian jackknives and pocket knives, as well as smaller penknife models designed to appeal to women buyers. In 1903, Schrade sold his interest in the New York Press Button Knife Co. to the Walden Knife Co., and moved to Walden, New York, where he opened a new factory. There Schrade became the company's production superintendent, establishing a production line to manufacture several patterns of Schrade-designed switchblade knives, ranging from a large folding hunter to a small pocket knife. Walden Knife Co. would go on to sell thousands of copies of Schrade's original bolster button design.

The advertising campaigns of the day by Schrade and other automatic knife manufacturers focused on marketing to farmers, ranchers, hunters, or outdoors men who needed a compact pocket knife that could be quickly brought into action when needed. In rural areas of America, these campaigns were partially successful, particularly with younger buyers, who aspired to own the most modern tools at a time when new labor-saving inventions were constantly appearing on the market. Most American-made switchblades made after 1900 were patterned after standard utilitarian pocketknives, though a few larger Bowie or Folding Hunter patterns were produced with blade shapes and lengths that could be considered useful as fighting knives. Most had flat or sabre-ground clip or spear-point blade profiles and single-sharpened edges. Blade lengths rarely exceeded 5 in (13 cm). A few manufacturers introduced the double switchblade, featuring two blades that could be automatically opened and locked with the push of a button.

At the low end of the market, Shapleigh Hardware Company of St. Louis, Missouri contracted thousands of switchblades under the trademark Diamond Edge for distribution to dealers across the United States and Canada. Most of these knives were novelty items, assembled at the lowest possible cost. Sold off display cards in countless hardware and general stores, many low-end Diamond Edge switchblades failed to last more than a few months in actual use. Other companies such as Imperial Knife and Remington Arms paid royalties to Schrade in order to produce automatic "contract knives" for rebranding and sale by large mail-order catalog retailers such as Sears, Roebuck & Co.

In 1904, in combination with his brothers Louis and William, George Schrade formed the Schrade Cutlery Co. in Walden, and began developing a new series of switchblades, which he patented in 1906–07. Schrade's new Safety Pushbutton Knives incorporated several design improvements over his earlier work, and featured a handle-mounted operating button with a sliding safety switch. A multi-blade operating button allowed the knife to operate with up to four automatic blades. In successive patents from 1906 through 1916 Schrade would steadily improve this design, which would later become known as the Presto series. With the Presto line, Schrade would largely dominate the automatic knife market in the United States for the next forty years. Schrade would go on to manufacture thousands of contract switchblade knives under several trademarks and brands, including E. Weck, Wade & Butcher, and Case XX, while other companies used Schrade's patent as the basis for their own switchblade patterns. Among these were pocket and folding hunter pattern switchblades bearing the name Keen Kutter, a trademark owned by E.C. Simmons Hardware Co. (later purchased by the Shapleigh Hardware Co.).

Having earned a handsome return from his work, Schrade traveled to Europe in 1911, first to Sheffield, England, where he assisted Thomas Turner & Company in expediting a wartime order from the British Navy. He next moved to the knifemaking center of Solingen, Germany. Schrade was aware of Solingen's reputation for having the best cutlery steel in Europe, and he opened a factory to produce his safety pushbutton switchblade knife there. In 1915 or 1916 Schrade sold his Solingen holdings (some sources state they were seized by the German government) and returned to the United States.

In 1918, Captain Rupert Hughes of the U.S. Army submitted a patent application for a specialized automatic-opening trench knife of his own design, the Hughes Trench Knife. This was a curious device consisting of a folding spring-loaded knife blade attached to a handle which fastened to the back of the hand and was secured by a leather strap, leaving the palm and fingers free for grasping other objects. Pressing a button on the handle automatically extended a knife blade into an open position and locked position, allowing the knife to be used as a stabbing weapon. The Hughes Trench Knife was evaluated as a potential military arm by a panel of U.S. Army officers from the American Expeditionary Force (AEF) in June 1918. After testing the board found the Hughes design to be of no value, and it was never adopted. Hughes went on to patent his automatic trench knife in 1919, though Hughes appears to have been unsuccessful in persuading a knife manufacturing company to produce his design.

From 1923 to 1951, the Union Cutlery Co. of Olean, New York produced a series of lever-operated switchblades designed for the mid and upper end of the market, featuring celluloid, stag, or jigged bone handles, a bolster-mounted push-button, all featuring the company's KA-BAR trademark on the blade tang. The line included the KA-BAR Grizzly, KA-BAR Baby Grizzly, and KA-BAR Model 6110 Lever Release knives. The largest model was KA-BAR Grizzly, a folding hunter pattern with a broad bowie-type clip point blade.

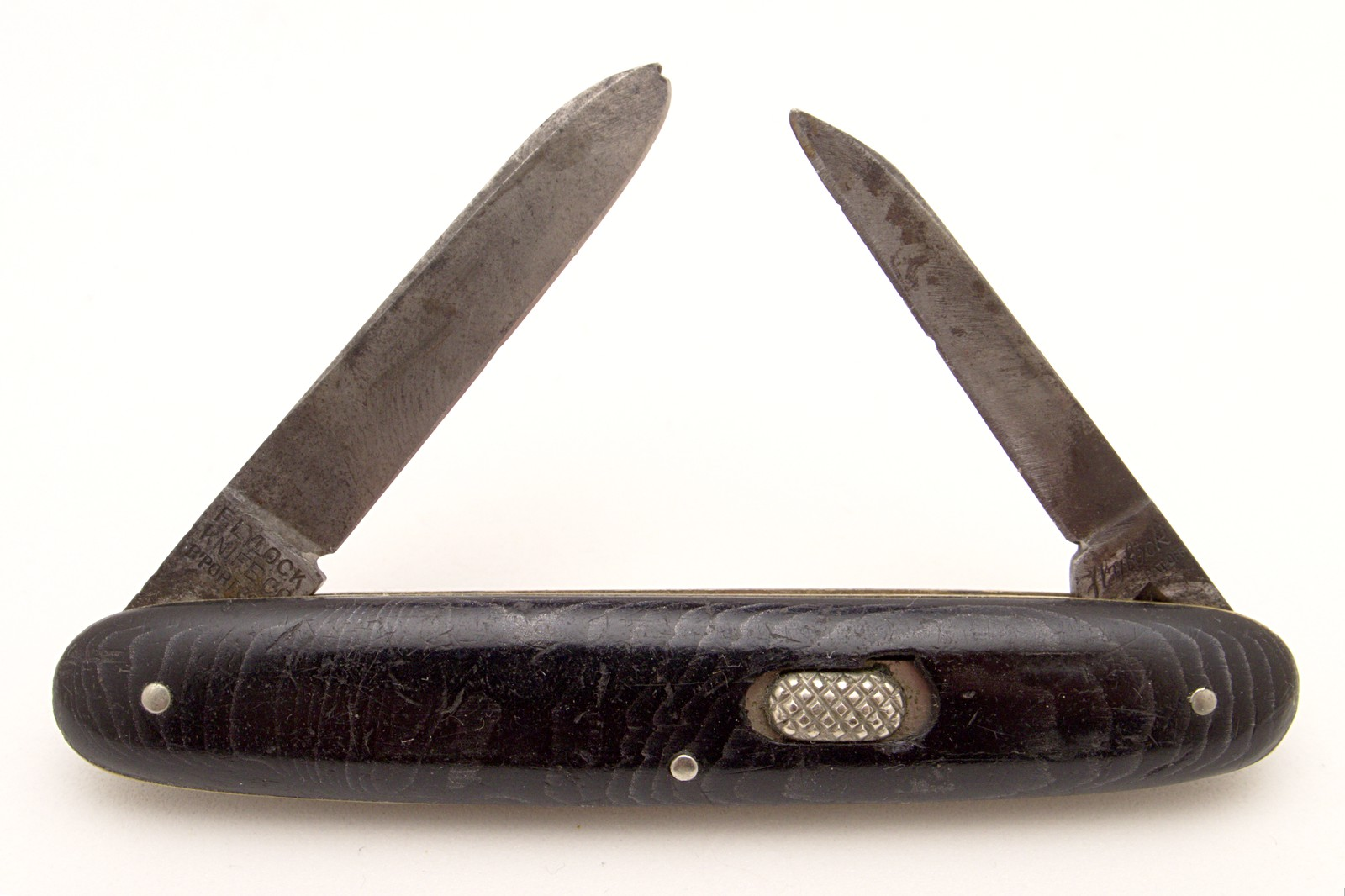
Pocket knife made by Flylock Knife Company of Bridgeport, Connecticut with two spring-loaded, button activated blades. Scales are made of horn. Measures 3 3/8" (86 mm) closed. These were manufactured from 1918 to 1929.

Upon returning to the United States, Schrade made a final improvement to his Presto series of switchblades, filing his patent application on June 6, 1916. The next year, Schrade licensed a new flylock switchblade design to the Challenge Cutlery Company, which he then joined. Under the trademark of Flylock Knife Co., Challenge made several patterns of the flylock switchblade, including a large 5 in (13 cm) folding hunter model with hinged floating guard and a small pen knife model designed to appeal to women buyers. A Challenge Cutlery advertisement of the day depicted a female hand operating a fly-lock automatic pen knife, accompanied by a caption urging women to buy one for their sewing kit so as not to break a nail while attempting to open a normal pen knife. Schrade pursued his knifemaking interests at both Challenge and at Schrade, where his brother George now managed one of the company's factories.

With a few ex-Challenge employees Schrade formed a second company, the Geo. Schrade Knife Company, primarily to manufacture his Presto series of switchblade knives. In 1937, Schrade came out with two more low-cost switchblade knives designed to appeal to youth, the Flying Jack and the Pull-Ball Knife. The Flying Jack had a sliding operating latch and could be produced with one or more automatically opening blades. The Pull-Ball opened by pulling a ball located on the butt end of the handle. Schrade would later manufacture alternative configurations to the ball operating handle, including dice, rings, eight balls, or different colors. The Pull-Ball required two hands to open, removing much of the switchblade's utility as a one-handed knife. As the blade catch mechanism required a good deal of space within the handle, the knife's blade length was short relative to its handle length. Schrade manufactured many pull-ball knives for sale under other brands, including Remington, Case, and the "J.C.N. Co." (Jewelry Cutlery Novelty Company of North Attleboro, Massachusetts) Always looking for a new way to appeal to customers, Schrade continued to experiment with new forms of switchblade designs up to the time of his death in 1940.

In the late 1930s the German Luftwaffe began training a Fallschirmjäger or paratroop force, and as part of this effort developed specialized equipment for the airborne soldier, including the Fallschirmjäger-Messer (paratrooper's knife), which used a gravity-operated mechanism to deploy its sliding spearpoint blade from the handle. The German paratrooper knife, which featured a marlinspike in addition to the cutting blade, was used to cut rigging and unknot lines, though it could be employed as a weapon in an emergency. The U.S. Army in 1940 tasked the Geo. Schrade Knife Co. to produce a small single-edge switchblade for U.S. airborne troops, to be used similarly to the Fallschirmjäger-Messer. The knife was not intended primarily as a fighting knife, but rather as a utility tool, to enable a paratrooper to rapidly cut himself out of his lines and harness in the event he could not escape them after landing.

The company's submission was approved by the U.S. Army Materiel Command in December 1940 as the Knife, Pocket, M2. The M2 had a 3.125 in (7.94 cm) clip-point blade and featured a carrying bail. Except for the bail, the M2 was for all intents and purposes a copy of George Schrade's popular Presto safety-button civilian model. The M2 was issued primarily to U.S. Army paratroopers during the war, though some knives appear to have been distributed to crews and members of the Office of Strategic Services. When issued to paratroopers, the M2 was normally carried in the dual-zippered knife pocket on the upper chest of the M42 jump uniform jacket. After the war, the M2 was manufactured by Schrade (now Schrade-Walden, Inc.) as the Parachutist's Snap Blade Knife (MIL-K-10043) under a postwar military contract. In addition, other companies such as the Colonial Knife Co. made civilian versions of the M2 after the war.

=== Postwar usage and the Italian stiletto ===
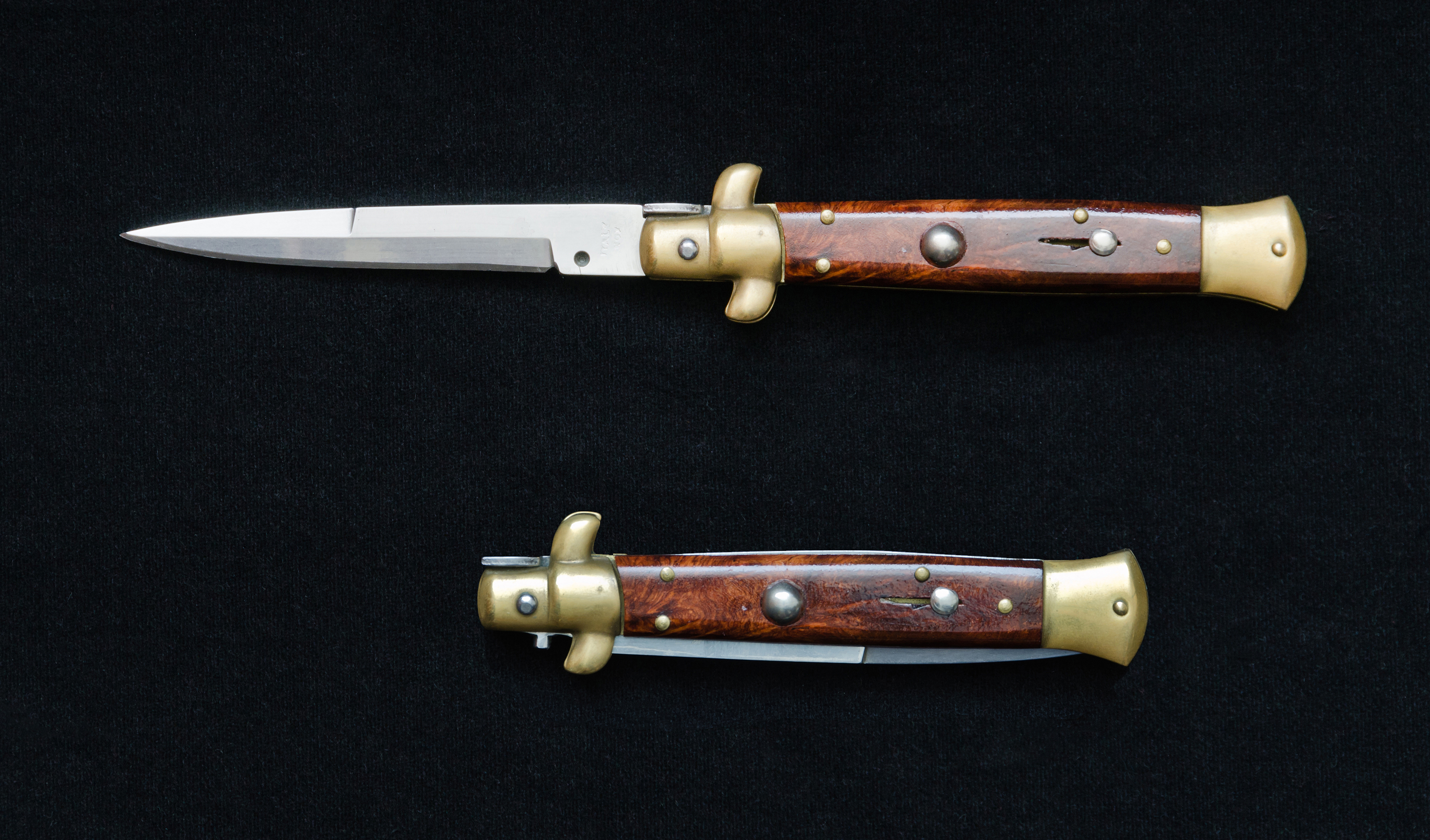
Italian stiletto

From the end of World War II until 1958, most U.S.-manufactured switchblades were manufactured by Schrade (now Schrade-Walden, Inc., a division of Imperial Knife Co.), and the Colonial Knife Co.

Schrade-Walden Inc. made knives under the Schrade-Walden trademark, while Colonial made a number of mass-produced switchblade patterns during the 1950s under the trademark Shur Snap. Designed to a price point, Shur Snap switchblades feature stamped plated sheet-metal bolsters and plastic scales.

In 1956, the U.S. Air Force requested development for a new aircrew knife with several requirements, including the ability to be opened with one hand. The final result was the MC-1 Aircrew Survival Knife. A development of the WW2-era M2 Parachutist Snap Blade knife, the MC-1 featured twin blades, The main blade was a blunt line-cutting blade with a protected sharpened inside edge for severing parachute lines, while the secondary blade opened automatically with a push button in the event the crew member could use only one hand. First issued in 1958, the MC-1 was restricted to U.S. military sales only, and was produced by the Camillus Cutlery Co., Logan/Smyth of Venice Florida, and Schrade-Walden Inc.. The last production contract for the MC-1 was cancelled in 1993.

After 1945, American soldiers returning home from Europe brought along individually purchased examples of the Italian style of stiletto pattern switchblade produced in Maniago and other cutlery towns. Though undeniably limited in practical usefulness, the style and beauty of the so-called stiletto switchblade was a revelation to US buyers accustomed to the utilitarian nature of most U.S.-made automatic knives such as the Schrade Presto pocketknife. Consumer demand for more of these knives resulted in the importation of large numbers of side-opening and telescoping blade switchblades, primarily from Italy. In the case of the switchblade, the name stiletto derives from the blade design, since most Italian designs incorporated a long, slender blade tapering to a needle-like point, together with a slim-profile handle and vestigial cross-guard reminiscent of the medieval weapon. The majority of these stiletto pattern switchblade knives used a now-iconic slender bayonet-style blade with a single sabre-ground edge and an opposing false edge. Other blade styles included the double-edged dagger and the curved-edge kris. Some were flimsy souvenirs made for tourists or novelty purchasers, while others were made with solid materials and workmanship. Eventually, many thousands of Italian switchblades were exported to the US. Around this time, the traditional Italian switchblade 'picklock' method of blade release was largely replaced by the tilt bolster mechanism, ending the "Golden Age" of hand-crafted Italian switchblades.

As with the medieval stiletto upon which it was based, the so-called stiletto switchblade was intended to be a concealable weapon optimized for thrusting rather than cutting or slashing (many imported stiletto switchblades had no sharpened cutting edge at all). These knives ranged in blade length from 2 to 18 in (5.1 to 45.7 cm). As a weapon, the stiletto switchblade was much less effective than most fixed-blade hunting and military knives commonly available in the US, including the Bowie knife and dagger, which could inflict deep slashing cuts as well as stab wounds. However, its peculiar properties of easy concealment and rapid blade deployment appealed to some, and as with any other knife, the stiletto switchblade could inflict a severe wound, given sufficient blade length.

=== 1950s gang usage and controversy ===
In 1950, an article titled "The Toy That Kills" appeared in the Woman's Home Companion, a widely read U.S. periodical of the day. The article sparked a storm of controversy and a nationwide campaign that would eventually result in state and federal laws criminalizing the importation, sale, and possession of automatic-opening knives. In the article, author Jack Harrison Pollack assured the reader that the growing switchblade "menace" could have deadly consequence "as any crook can tell you". Pollack, a former aide to Democratic Senator Harley M. Kilgore and a ghostwriter for then-President Harry S Truman, had authored a series of melodramatic magazine articles calling for new laws to address a variety of social ills. In "The Toy That Kills", Pollack wrote that the switchblade was "Designed for violence, deadly as a revolver—that's the switchblade, the 'toy' youngsters all over the country are taking up as a fad. Press the button on this new version of the pocketknife and the blade darts out like a snake's tongue. Action against this killer should be taken now". To back up his charges, Pollack quoted an unnamed juvenile court judge as saying: "It's only a short step from carrying a switchblade to gang warfare".

During the 1950s, established U.S. newspapers as well as the sensationalist tabloid press joined forces in promoting the image of a young delinquent with a stiletto switchblade or flick knife. While the press focused on the switchblade as a symbol of youthful evil intent, the American public's attention was attracted by lurid stories of urban youth gang warfare and the fact that many gangs were composed of lower class youth and/or racial minorities. The purported offensive nature of the stiletto switchblade combined with reports of knife fights, robberies, and stabbings by youth gangs and other criminal elements in urban areas of the United States generated continuing demands from newspaper editorial rooms and the public for new laws restricting the lawful possession and/or use of switchblade knives—with particular emphasis on racial minorities, especially African-American and Hispanic teens. In 1954, the state of New York passed the first law banning the sale or distribution of switchblade knives in hopes of reducing gang violence. That same year, Democratic Rep. James J. Delaney of New York authored the first bill submitted to the U.S. Congress banning the manufacture and sale of switchblades.

Some U.S. congressmen saw the switchblade controversy as a political opportunity to capitalize on constant negative accounts of the switchblade knife and its connection to violence and youth gangs. This coverage included not only magazine articles but also highly popular films of the late 1950s including Rebel Without a Cause (1955), Blackboard Jungle (1955), Crime in the Streets (1956), 12 Angry Men (1957), The Delinquents (1957), High School Confidential (1958), and the 1957 Broadway musical West Side Story. Hollywood's fixation on the switchblade as the symbol of youth violence, sex, and delinquency resulted in renewed demands from the public and Congress to control the sale and possession of such knives. State laws restricting or criminalizing switchblade possession and use were adopted by an increasing number of state legislatures.

In 1957, Senator Estes Kefauver (D) of Tennessee attempted unsuccessfully to pass a law restricting the importation and possession of switchblade knives. Opposition to the bill from the U.S. knife making industry was muted, with the exception of the Colonial Knife Co. and Schrade-Walden Inc., which were still manufacturing small quantities of pocket switchblades for the U.S. market. Some in the industry even supported the legislation, hoping to gain market share at the expense of Colonial and Schrade. However, the legislation failed to receive expected support from the U.S. Departments of Commerce and Justice, which considered the legislation unenforceable and an unwarranted intrusion into lawful sales in interstate commerce.

While Kefauver's bill failed, a new U.S. Senate bill prohibiting the importation or possession of switchblade knives in interstate commerce was introduced the following year by Democratic Senator Peter F. Mack Jr. of Illinois in an attempt to reduce gang violence in Chicago and other urban centers in the state. With youth violence and delinquency aggravated by the severe economic recession, Mack's bill was enacted by Congress and signed into law as the Switchblade Knife Act of 1958.

The melodrama created by US media towards the stiletto switchblade had its effect in Canada and the United Kingdom. The US Switchblade Knife Act was closely followed by the UK Restriction of Offensive Weapons Act of 1959. In Canada, Parliament amended the Criminal Code in 1959 to include all new-production automatic knives as prohibited weapons - banned from importation, sale or possession within that country.

The new laws treated all automatic-opening knives as a prohibited class, even knives with utility or general-purpose blades not generally used by criminals. Curiously, the sale and possession of stilettos and other 'offensive' knives with fixed or lockback blades were not prohibited. In other U.S. states, the sale and possession of switchblade knives remained legal, particularly in rural states where a significant proportion of the population possessed firearms. As late as 1968, Jack Pollack was still writing lurid articles demanding further federal legislation prohibiting the purchase or possession of switchblade knives. That same year, New York congressman Lester L. Wolff (D) even read one of Pollack's articles into the U.S. Congressional Record while introducing legislation to further restrict the sale and transportation of switchblades, arguing that 'switchblade knives have no redeeming social value and are restricted almost solely to violence'.

As an anti-violence measure, legislation against switchblade sales or use clearly failed in the United States, as youth street gangs increasingly turned from bats and knives to handguns, MAC-10s, and AK-47s to settle their disputes over territory as well as income from prostitution, extortion, and illicit drug sales. In fact, the U.S. murder rate using cutting or stabbing instruments of all types declined from 23% of all murders in 1965 to just 12% in 2012.

==== 1970-2000 ====
By the late 1960s, new production of switchblades in the United States was largely limited to military contract automatic knives such as the MC-1.

In Italy, switchblades known among collectors as "Transitionals" were made with a mix of modern parts and leftover old style parts.

Switchblade knives continued to be sold and collected in those states in which possession remained legal. In the 1980s, automatic knife imports to the U.S. resumed with the concept of kit knives, allowing the user to assemble a working switchblade from a parts kit with the addition of a mainspring or other key part (often sold separately). Since no law prohibited importation of switchblade parts or unassembled kits, all risk of prosecution was assumed by the assembling purchaser, not the importer. This loophole was eventually closed by new federal regulations.

==== Present day ====
The ability to purchase or carry switchblades or automatic knives continues to be heavily restricted or prohibited throughout much of Europe, with some notable exceptions. In Britain, the folding type of switchblade is commonly referred to as a flick knife. In the UK, knives with an automated opening system are nearly impossible to acquire or carry legally; although they can legally be owned, it is illegal to manufacture, sell, hire, give, lend, or import such knives. This definition would nominally restrict lawful ownership to 'grandfathered' automatic knives already in possession by their owner prior to the enactment of the applicable law in 1959. Even when such a knife is legally owned, carrying it in public without good reason or lawful authority is also illegal under current UK laws.

Under US federal laws, switchblades remain illegal to import from abroad or to purchase through interstate commerce since 1958 under the old Switchblade Knife Act (15 U.S.C. §§1241-1245). In recent years, many U.S. states have repealed laws prohibiting the purchase or possession of automatic or switchblade knives in their entirety.

==== Modern-day switchblade development ====
Despite federal law, there are still a number of U.S. knife companies and custom makers who build automatic knives, primarily for use by the military and emergency personnel. Some well known present-day automatic knife manufacturers include Buck Knives, Colonial Knife Co., Microtech Knives, Benchmade, Severtech, Gerber Legendary Blades, Mikov, Pro-Tech Knives, Dalton, Böker, Spyderco, Kershaw Knives, and Piranha. Colonial currently manufactures the M724 Automatic Rescue Knife, which is currently being issued for use in all U.S. military aircraft ejection seat survival kits.

The classic Italian-style stiletto switchblade continues to be produced in Italy, Taiwan, and China. Automatic knife manufacture in Italy consists predominantly as a cottage industry of family-oriented businesses. These include Frank Beltrame and AGA Campolin, which have been making automatic knives using hand assembly techniques for more than half a century. Since the late 1990s, the nations of Taiwan and China have emerged as large-scale producers of automatic knives.

Automatic or switchblade knives have been produced in the following countries: Argentina, China, Czech Republic, England, France, Germany, Hong Kong, India, Italy, Japan, Mexico, Korea, Pakistan, Poland, Russia, Spain, Switzerland, Taiwan and U.S.A.

== See also ==
- Assisted-opening knife
- Ballistic knife
- Butterfly knife
- Gravity knife
