= Xun Lei Chong =

Musket

The xun lei chong.

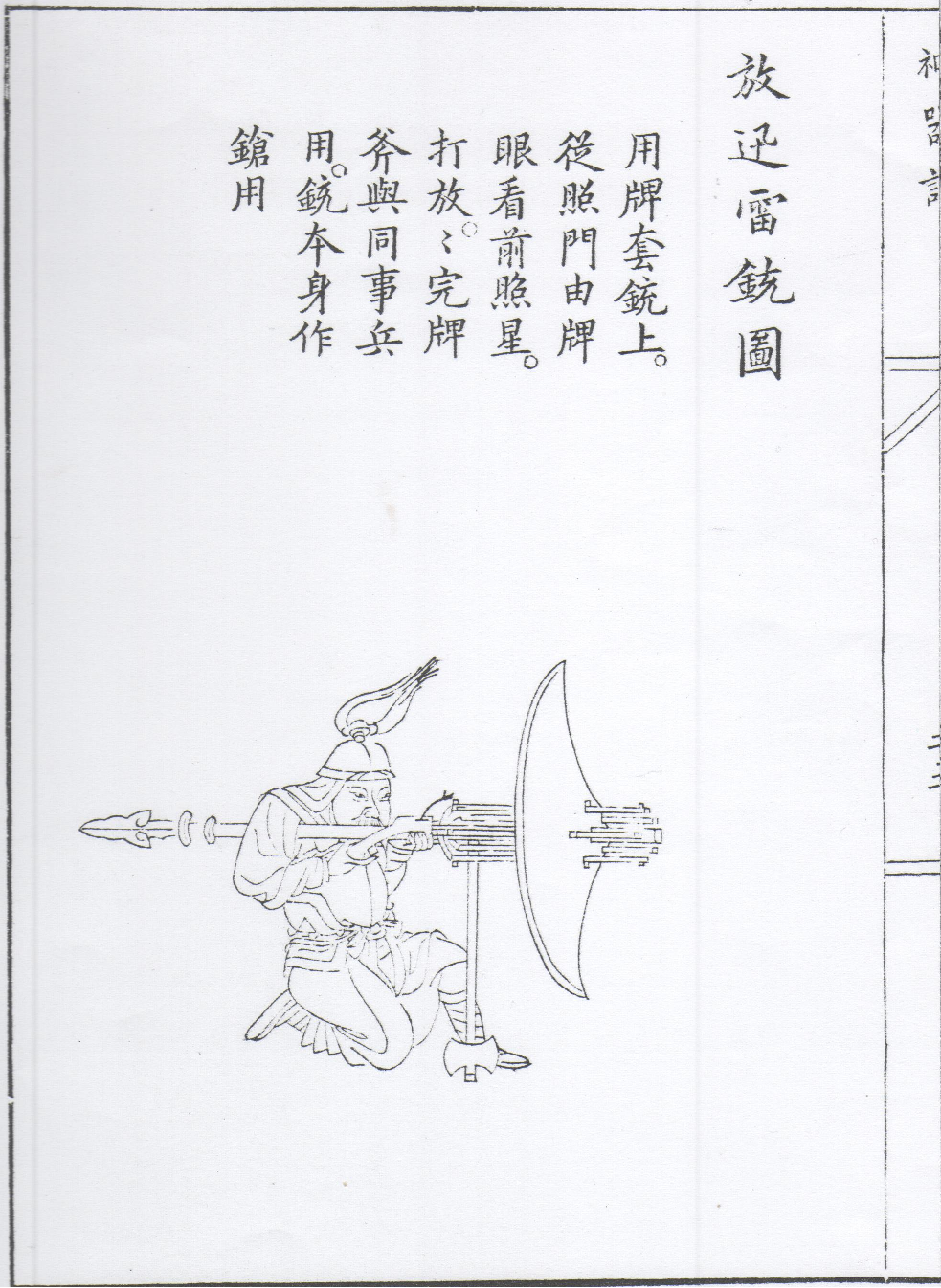
Musketeer firing a xun lei chong.

The xun lei chong (simplified Chinese: 迅雷铳; traditional Chinese: 迅雷銃; lit. 'Thundering fast firearm') is a revolving-barrel, spear-combined musket.

The five thin gun barrels of the xun lei chong are connected behind a reinforced shield: like the five thunder divine machine, the gunner could rotate the fuse 72 degrees and swiftly light each barrel with his match. These weapons would serve as defensive weapons, and were fired from walls or high positions like hillocks and ridges. They were recorded to be deadly at 120 paces.

The central firing device is a combination of a detachable spear, five tubings, and a firing mechanism, all fitted together with interlocking grooves. The shield could be pulled off from the front and slung on the hand, and the gun's rest is a double-sided hand axe.

== See also ==
- List of multiple-barrel firearms
