= High efficiency glandless circulating pump =

Component of HVAC systems

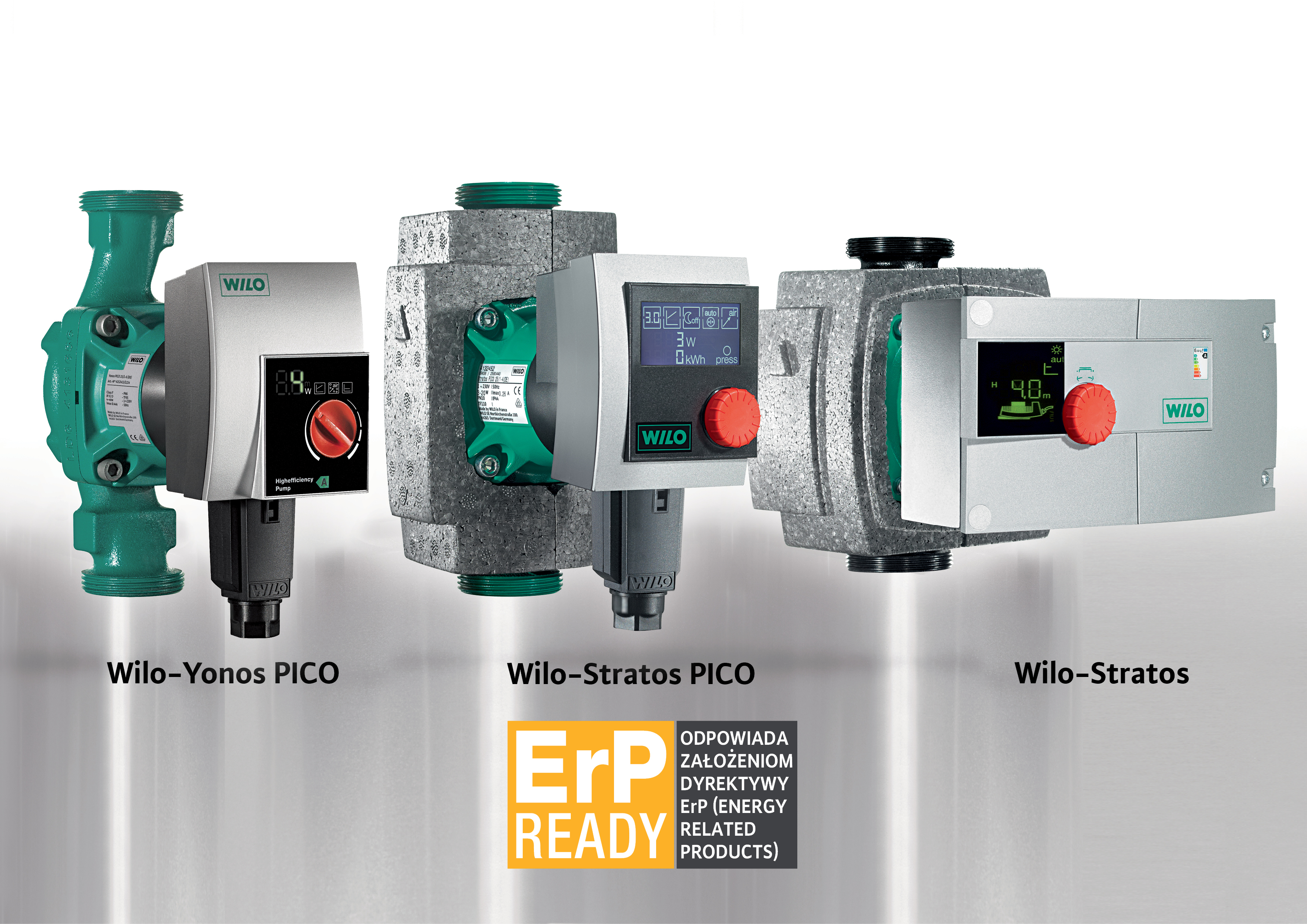
Three different high efficiency glandless circulating pumps designed and developed by the company Wilo.

A high efficiency glandless circulating pump is a component of a heating and air conditioning system that allows the system to perform with increased efficiency while significantly reducing the system's electrical usage.

== Description ==
The pump is primarily composed of an electronically commutated synchronous motor (ECM) with a permanent magnet rotor. The ECM is a motor that converts a direct current (DC) from an electrical source into an alternating current (AC) which is sent to the motor itself, allowing for increased efficiency over standard AC motors. The permanent magnet rotor consists of an iron core, surrounded by multiple magnetic rare earth metals, and finally a metal sleeve that evenly spaces the magnets around the core, which helps to drive the motor.

By utilizing multiple small improvements in pump-design technology such as a double pump in parallel system and variable controls, these pumps are able to run at about a 50% to 70% increased efficiency with up to an 80% decrease in electricity consumption over the previous standard design. This pump has recently become the new standard in both commercial and residential buildings across the European Union due to a recent ordinance by the European ErP (Eco-Design) Directive. The ErP directive began enforcing this new standard of regulation of these pumps 1 January 2013 and will become even stricter on efficiency standards on 1 August 2015 in order to meet the EU's goal of a 50% total reduction in the pump's energy usage by 2020.

== Pump design ==
=== Primary factors ===
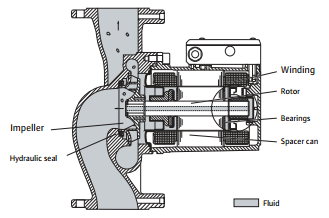
Diagram of the different components that make up a standard high efficiency glandless circulating pump.

The primary design factors of a high efficiency glandless circulating pump include an electronically commutated synchronous motor, a permanent magnet rotor, and canned rotor technology. An electronically commutated synchronous motor is used to convert the energy current from a DC energy source into an AC current which is supplied to the drive motor. It utilizes the magnetomotive force which is generated by surface currents placed on the surfaces of the stator and rotor and the permanent magnets to generate the electric current which is in output to the drive motor.

The canned rotor technology eliminates the need for a shaft seal that many conventional pumps must use through its unique design. Whereas standard pumps with shaft seals have multiple chambers with different rotating parts in each, canned rotor technology allows all of the rotating parts within the pump to exist in a single chamber. This increases the overall efficiency since the liquid used to lubricate the shaft bearings is also used to cool the motor. The electronic components of the motor are attached outside this system by means of an encapsulated motor cartridge, which is an independent metal compartment used solely for housing the electronic components.

=== Secondary factors ===
Many minor factors of the pump's design including its double pump system and control options give it additional efficiency without sacrificing any of its performance. By using a double pump system together with variable and automatic control, the pump is able to decrease its energy consumption while increasing efficiency and reliability. Using the pump's variable controls allows the pump to base its amount of energy consumption on how much it is actually performing, cutting down on usage during non-peak hours and extending the pump's life span. The automatic controls allow the pump to follow a set schedule of how much energy to consume during specific hours, which allows building owners to cut down even further on electricity costs. By dividing the output into a double pump in parallel design, the system is able to greatly adapt to partial load conditions. This accounts for a significant increase in reliability and the 50% to 70% efficiency increase that these high efficiency pumps achieve.

== Implementation ==
These types of pumps are used primarily in heating and air conditioning systems within both residential and commercial buildings such as offices and apartment complexes. The pump is the central component of these systems and accounts for most of the electricity usage within the system, making its design key to an increase in efficiency and decrease in energy consumption. Although the pump can be installed both inside and outside of buildings, many precautions must be taken in order to protect the pump from unfavorable weather conditions. These pumps are fairly simple to integrate into systems that follow the old standard since each pump is able to increase its efficiency by changing its design internally, meaning it will still fit into older systems without any problems requiring special adapters.

== Necessity ==
High efficiency glandless circulating pumps have become the industry standard when developing and maintaining buildings within the European Union due to recent changes to the carbon emissions goals. Commercial and residential buildings now have to be outfitted with these pumps in order to decrease electricity usage and, in the long run, decrease the amount of pollutants produced. This new standard, referred to as the energy efficiency index (EEI), will set the bare minimum efficiency level at 0.27, and set the efficiency grading scale from this base value. The EU has also scheduled the efficiency scale to be revised again by 1 August 2015 to set the minimum efficiency to 0.23.

Various companies such as Wilo have successfully developed pumps that have been projected to save up to 80% in electricity usage, meeting both of the new grading scale minimums set this year and in 2015. Pump designs are still being revised to continually try to achieve higher efficiency standards and lower the impact on the environment in order to meet the goal of up to a 50% reduction in both CO_{2} emissions and electricity usage across the EU by 2020.
