= Homologation =

Granting of approval by an official authority

Homologation (Greek homologeo, ὁμολογέω, "to agree") is the granting of approval by an official authority. Historically, it was most frequently used to describe the approval process for railway tariffs in France.

This may be a court of law, a government department, or an academic or professional body, any of which would normally work from a set of rules or standards to determine whether such approval should be given. The word may be considered very roughly synonymous with accreditation, and in fact in French and Spanish may be used with regard to academic degrees (see apostille). Certification is another possible synonym, while to homologate is the infinitive verb form.

In today's marketplace, for instance, products must often be homologated by some public agency to assure that they meet standards for such things as safety and environmental impact. In some instances a court action must also be homologated by a judicial authority before it can proceed, and the term has a precise legal meaning in the judicial codes of some countries.

The equivalent process of testing and certification for conformance to technical standards is usually known as type approval in English-language jurisdictions.

== Sport ==
=== Motorsports ===
In motorsports a vehicle must be type approved by the sanctioning body to race in a given league, such as World Superbike, International Level Kart Racing, or other sportscar racing/touring car racing series.

Where a racing class requires that the vehicles raced be production vehicles only slightly adapted for racing, manufacturers typically produce a limited run of such vehicles for public sale so that they can legitimately race them in the class. These vehicles are commonly called "homologation specials".

=== Olympics ===
The term is also applicable in the Olympic Games, in venue certifications, prior to the start of competition. An issue was raised at Cesana Pariol—the bobsleigh, luge, and skeleton track used for the 2006 Winter Olympics in Turin—over its safety in luge. This delayed homologation of the track from January 2005 to October 2005 in order to achieve safe runs during luge competitions.

=== Other sports ===
In towed water sports, tournaments must adhere to homologation requirements set by the International Waterski & Wakeboard Federation in order to qualify as ranking. In speed climbing, in order for world, continental or national records to be recognised by the International Federation of Sport Climbing, an official homologated wall must be used, and each event must be approved through a homologation visit.

== See also ==
- European professional qualification directives
- NARIC
- Professional certification
- Standardization
- Type approval
