= Framework Directive =

Framework directives of the European Union:

== By directive number ==
- Directive 89/391/EEC of 1989 to encourage improvements in the safety and health of workers
- Directive 2000/60/EC of 2000 in the field of water policy, see Water Framework Directive
- Directive 2002/21/EC of 2002 on a regulatory framework for electronic communications, see Telecommunications in the European Union
- Directive 2007/46/EC of 2007 for vehicles, see Type approval#Automotive industry

== By name ==
- Employment Equality Framework Directive
- Waste framework directive
- Water Framework Directive

== See also ==
- List of European Union directives
