= Combination weapons =

Gun hybrid

A combination weapon is a close-quarters gun hybrid combining the features of both a firearm and an edged melee weapon. Examples of gun hybrids include knife/pistols and pistol/sword combinations.

== History ==
According to the book Weaponry: An Illustrated History, by Chuck Wills, between the late 16th century and the advances in repeating firearms in the mid 19th century, blades or clubs were often fitted onto guns, because only one shot could be fired from the gun. Without an alternative weapon attachment, they became useless at close range. Some of the first included the German axe-pistol, made in the central European region of Silesia. This weapon combined a flintlock pistol with a battleaxe. Later, a pistol-sword combination formed in the mid 18th century, which was apparently used mainly by marines and naval officers in boarding engagements at sea. Additionally, Dumonthier & Sons produced several knife pistol combinations. Pocket knives with zip guns inside were made by Unwin & Rodgers, and an Indian gunsmith fitted a percussion cap gun to a mace in the 19th century. Even some shields were fitted with barrels, sometimes designed to look like a spike, and other times placed in cleverly concealed holes.

Examples of combination weapons
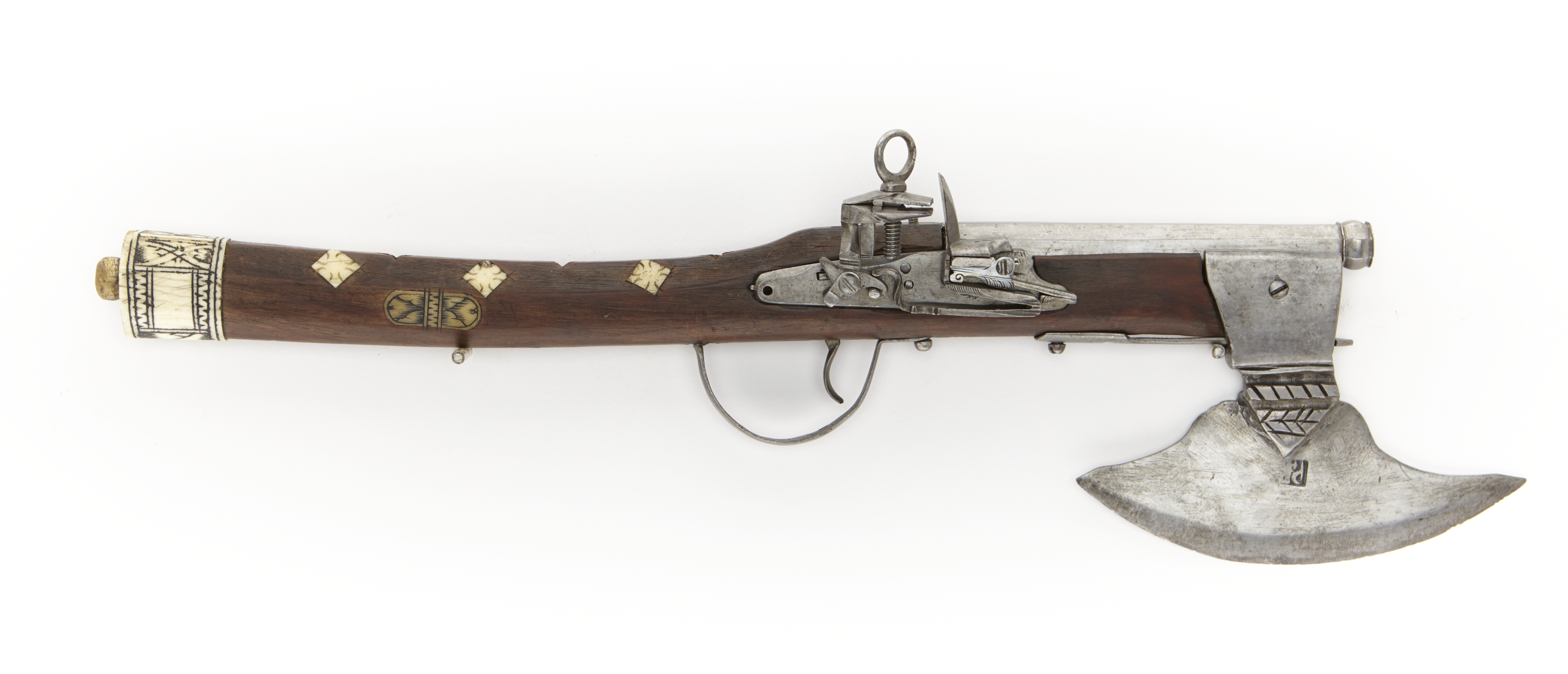
A pistol axe from the mid 17th century

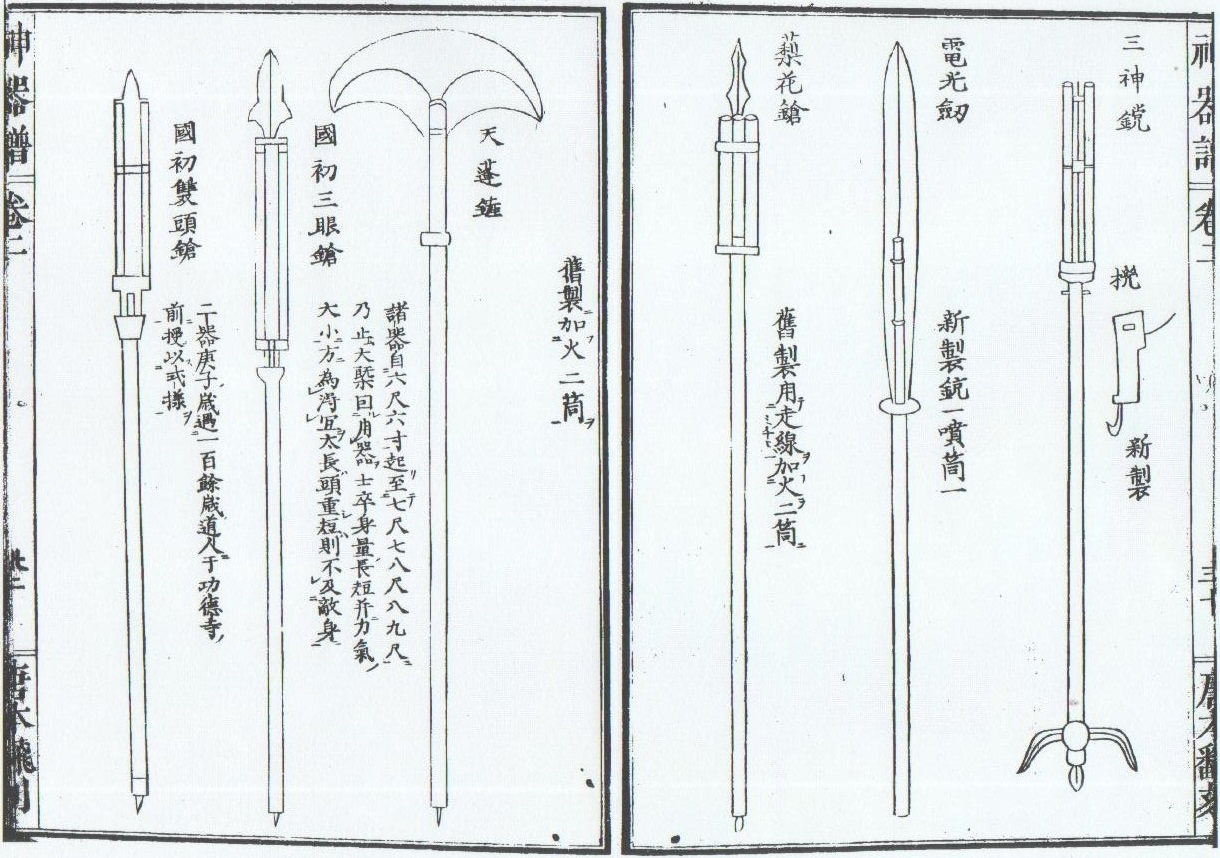
Combination weapons in the Ming dynasty. These are named by melee weapon part.

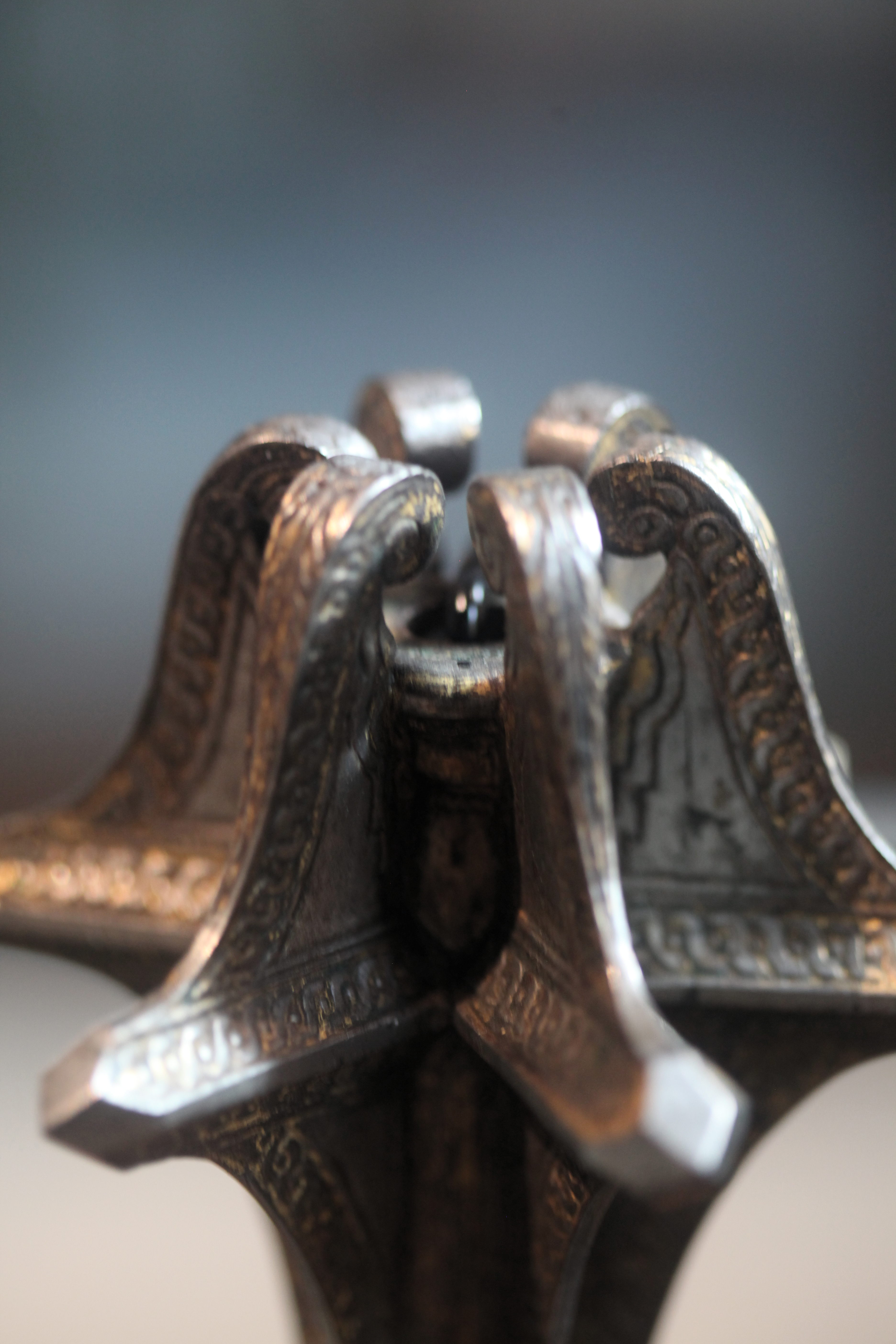
Detail of a French mace-pistol made circa 1550

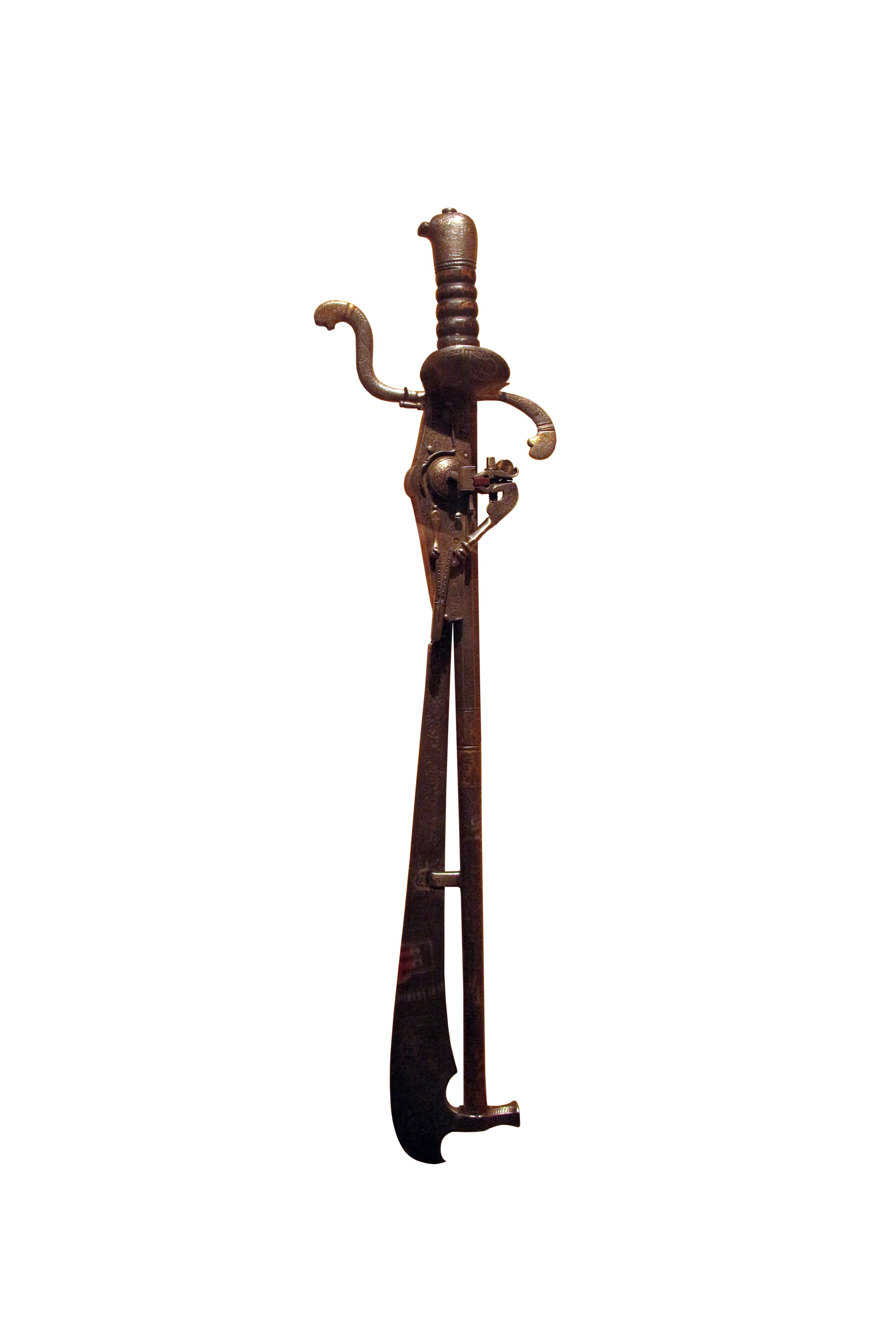
Wheellock pistol-falchion. German work for the Dukes of Modena.

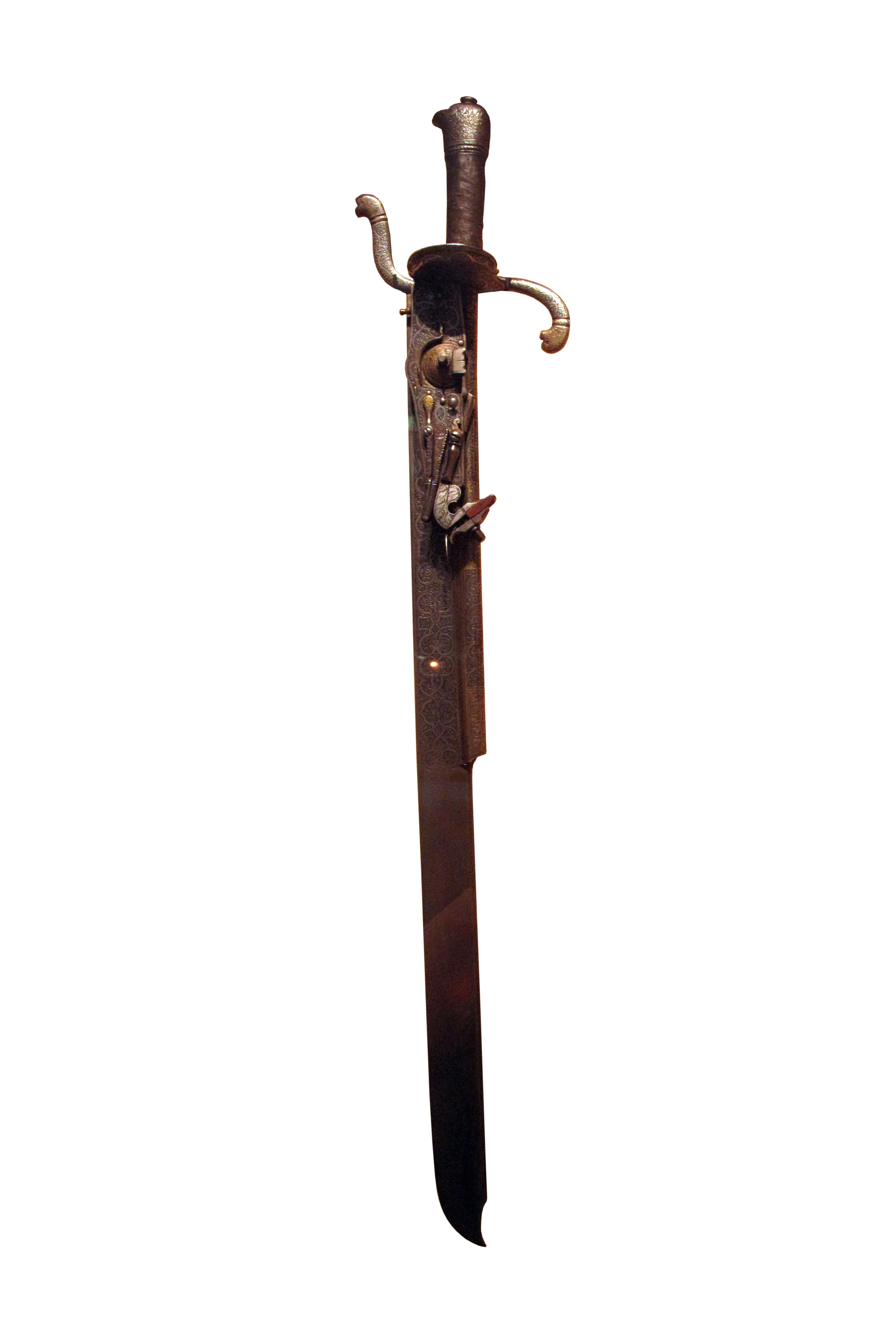
Wheellock pistol-falchion. German work for the Dukes of Modena.

== See also ==
- Gun shield
- Pistol sword
- Sumpit
- Xun Lei Chong
