= Type approval =

Regulatory standard on products

Type approval or certificate of conformity is granted to a product that meets a minimum set of regulatory, technical and safety requirements. Generally, type approval is required before a product is allowed to be sold in a particular country, so the requirements for a given product will vary around the world. Processes and certifications known as type approval in English are often called homologation, or some cognate expression, in other European languages.

Compliance with type approval requirements can be denoted by a third-party marking on the back of the product (e.g. ABS, TÜV, UL, CSA, KIWA), or by a type-approval certificate obtained by a manufacturer and kept on file. The CE mark found on the back of many electronic devices does not mean that the product has obtained type approval in the European Union. The CE mark is the manufacturer's declaration that the system/assembly meets the minimum safety requirements of all the directives (laws) applicable to it, and of itself, does not signify any third party involvement in the design or testing of a system/assembly. Many of the New Approach safety directives do not mandate third party involvement at all (e.g. LVD, EMD), and the ones that do (e.g. PED, MDD, ATEX) only require notified body (NoBo) involvement above a certain degree of risk category. When the risk category mandates this involvement, the CE marking on the system/assembly will be followed by the NoBo number, which right to use is granted by the NoBo after the required design review, testing or auditing, as spelled out in the Conformity Assessment options of each directive. On the other hand, in China type approval is denoted by the CCC mark.

Type approval is not a term confined to a particular industry. Type approval requirements exist for products as diverse as marine equipment, mobile phones, automotive industry, or medical equipment. Type approval simply means that the product is certified to meet certain requirements for its type, whatever that may be.

== Automotive industry ==
Vehicle type approval is the confirmation that production samples of a design will meet specified performance standards. Traditionally, there are two systems of type approval in Europe. The first one is based on the EC directives and regulates the approval of whole vehicles, vehicle systems, and separate components. The second one is part of the United Nations Economic Commission for Europe regulations (UNECE) and also regulates the approval of whole vehicles, vehicle systems, and separate components. Recent changes to the requirements have seen the General Safety Regulation (GSR) EC661/2009 amending Directive 2007/46/EC by substituting the equivalent UNECE regulations in place of the EC directives. In effect the directives are being replaced by UNECE regulations. This now makes compliance with the UNECE regulations for type approval submissions compulsory from 1 November 2012 and compulsory for all vehicles entering to service from 1 November 2014.

The new Framework Directive (Directive 2007/46/EC establishing a framework for the approval of motor vehicles and their trailers, and of systems, components and separate technical units intended for such vehicles) rules the approval schemes of the new motor vehicles and their trailers in the European Union:

- European Community Whole Vehicle Type Approval (ECWVTA), this currently applies to passenger cars. from 29 October 2012, ECWVTA was extended to cover all new road vehicles and their trailers.
- United Nations Economic Commission for Europe (UNECE) regulations.
- National Small Series Type Approval (NSSTA) - a key advantage of this scheme is that some technical requirements may be reduced or eliminated in comparison with ECWVTA; however, the number of vehicles that can be manufactured is limited to 250 per type, per calendar year in the UK.
- Individual vehicle approval (IVA) (previously single vehicle approval)

== Telecommunications ==
Each jurisdiction that regulates communications requires all types of equipment, and especially radio communications equipment, that are not specifically exempted (by reason of low power output, for instance) to be tested for conformance to local regulations before it is approved for use in that jurisdiction. Such conformance might include power and noise characteristics, use of permitted frequencies only, frequency stability, and various other electrical parameters.

== Certificates of conformity, conformance or compliance ==
=== American commerce ===
A certificate of conformance is defined in American commerce as a document certified by a competent authority that the supplied good or service meets the required specifications. A certificate of conformance is a lot/datecode specific certification that provides traceability of the goods back to the point of manufacture.

=== American nuclear business ===
A certificate of conformity may be required of vendors of goods to nuclear generating stations to get the vendor to legally commit to stating compliance with applicable laws and regulations.

=== European commerce ===
A CoC or EC Certificate of Conformity is equal to a declaration of the conformity with the type approval of EC. It is produced to ensure the free movement of equipment within the European Union, specifically for equipment that is subject to homologation or registration. A CoC is a producer's declaration that equipment, e.g. a car or motorcycles comply with the given approved type. This document contains information about the equipment and its producer's identification, type approval number, other technical specifications. The content of a CoC is defined by the European regulation (Amendment IX, Regulation 92/53). Equipment which do not comply with the EU specification (e.g. vehicle manufactured for the U.S. or Japanese market) and older equipment that have not been given the type approval of the EC yet, cannot have an existing CoC. Similarly, it is not possible to issue a CoC for converted vehicles; in this case another technical document might help register your car. Only car and motorcycles are eligible.

==== History and legislation ====
Certificates of conformity have been defined in EU's Single Internal Market and Type Approval Directive (EC-92). EU's single internal market became official on 1 January 1993. Part of the "EC-92" effort was to remove the technical barriers preventing the free movement of products within the EU market. The greatest impact of this effort has been in the area of standards in the automotive sector. The EU Commission is seeking to harmonise the automotive, technical and environmental standards between all the member states. EU legislation defines the standards in the areas of noise, particle emissions and safety. In addition, the EU's Directive on Type Approval (EU Council Directive 92/53) eliminates the need for national type approval requirements by establishing one set of rules for automobiles and their components throughout the EU. This directive aims at the clarification of the type approval procedure for motor vehicles, separate technical units (i.e., trailers), and components.

It simplifies the documentation, designates the type approval number of a separate technical unit by a certificate of conformity, and defines the vehicles, individual technical units, and components. Certificates of conformity, as specified in Annex IX of EU Directive 92/53, will be required for an automobile to enter into service. For component approvals, an endorsement that is issued under the relevant regulations by the U.N. Economic Commission for Europe (UNECE) is recognised as equivalent to an approval granted under comparable EU legislation. In March 1992, the EU Council formally adopted the few remaining pieces of component-related legislation that are necessary to make the whole-vehicle type approval a reality for passenger cars. In June 1992, EU member state officials approved the adoption of EU legislation creating a single system for the certification of passenger cars, in turn defining the safety, and other technical, requirements. Legislation established an EU type approval system to replace the national schemes of the twelve member states. In 1996, the EU type approval system became mandatory.

Vehicles with an EU type approval can be marketed anywhere in the European Community. Therefore, a vehicle only needs to receive the type approval certification in one EU country in order to be accepted in all of the other member countries. To receive a type approval, products may either be brought to a testing facility or manufacturers may opt to maintain their own testing equipment. Nevertheless, US and EU automobiles still must be certified to this single set of rules by an authorised member state agency. A similar system was adopted for the type approval of two- and three-wheeled vehicles, which became effective on 1 January 1994.

== See also ==
- American Bureau of Shipping
- Aftermarket kit
- Euro NCAP
- Lloyd's Register
- National Highway Traffic Safety Administration
- Type certificate - for aircraft
- Vehicle registration
