= Weighted-knuckle glove =

Type of glove containing powdered metal

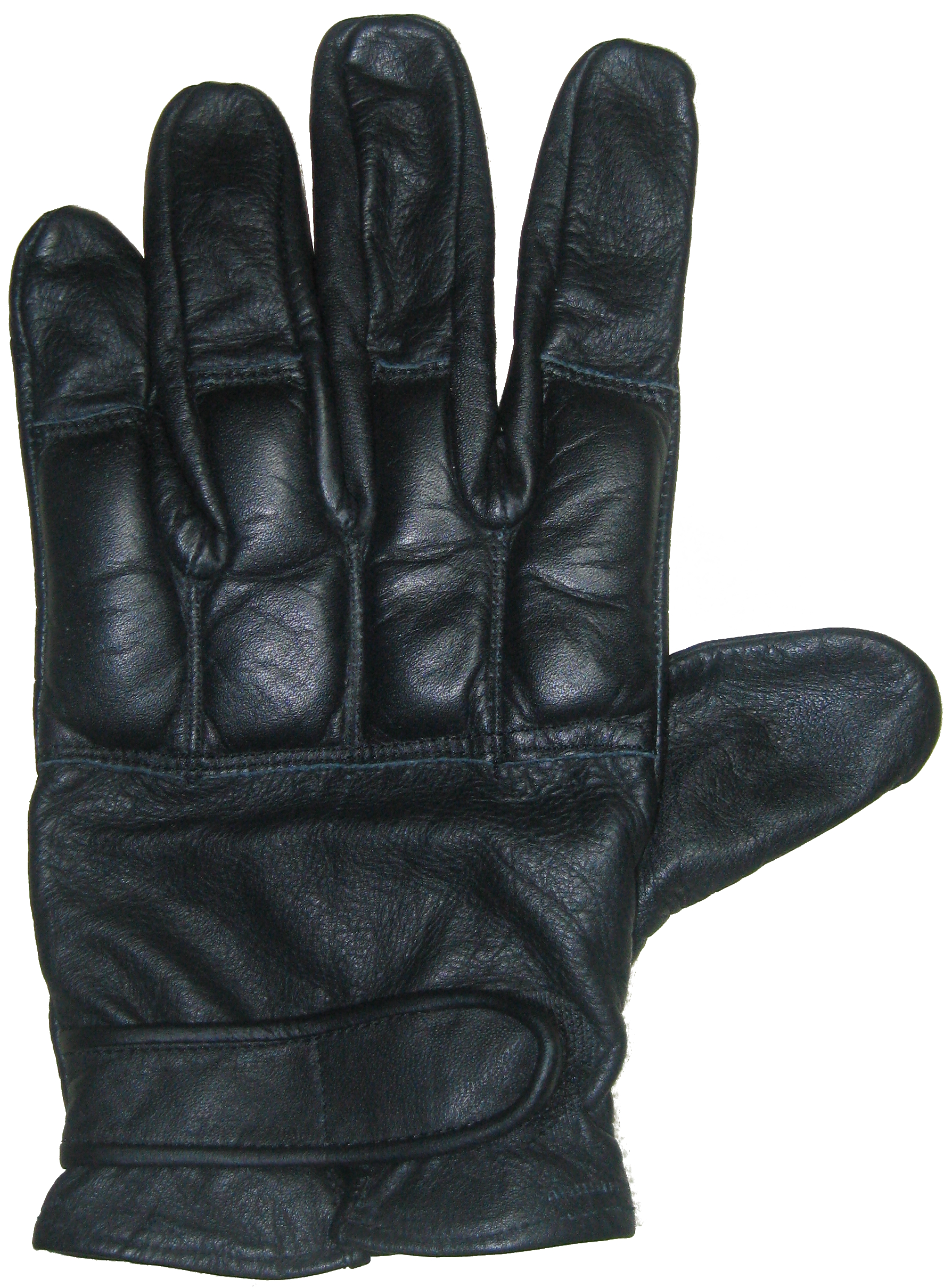
Weighted-knuckle glove for the left hand, with pouches containing powdered metal on the top side, over the knuckles

Weighted-knuckle gloves, also called sap gloves, are a type of handwear-concealed weapon used in hand-to-hand combat, consisting of a pair of ordinary-looking impact protection gloves usually made of leather or a synthetic material, with powdered lead or steel sewn into a special pouch covering the knuckles, and often also the backs of the fingers and the hand. In some designs, this distinctive feature is obvious, while in others it is almost completely indistinguishable from an ordinary glove, allowing the gloves to be worn in plain sight without suspicion.

Such gloves are primarily used by security guards and by bouncers and other security professionals where street fights are expected, protecting the user's hands and increasing the impulse created when punching. In some jurisdictions, weighted-knuckle gloves are prohibited or restricted as dangerous weapons.

== Usage ==
The purpose of these gloves in combat is both offensive and defensive. Offensively, the weight of the metal powder adds mass and, by doing so, also adds kinetic energy to punches, back-hands, and other hand strikes. The weighting also distributes the impact in a manner similar to a blackjack, transferring concussive force in the case of a head-strike to cause a knockout. Compared to brass knuckles (which are designed to concentrate the force of a punch onto a smaller area and cause more localized tissue damage, sometimes even shearing or puncturing the skin), weighted-knuckle gloves are designed to inflict a more diffuse blunt injury.

A secondary function of the gloves is to protecting the user's hand from injury. Punches with an unprotected hand to an opponent's head/face can damage the hand, with strikes to the mouth possibly leading to lacerations and even infection from the opponent's teeth. The layer of powdered metal protects the hand while being flexible enough to bend with the glove. With a properly executed strike, a person wearing weighted-knuckle gloves can even break glass or concrete without pain or injury.

The gloves can also help protect the hand from blows inflicted by an opponent, both in blocking strikes from blunt weapons such as sticks, bats, or batons backhanded, and strikes from a gripped opponent attempting to free themselves. Some designs include a Kevlar lining to add further protection against cuts.

== Legality ==
Weighted-knuckle gloves may be either legal or illegal dependent upon the laws in a specific jurisdiction; however, they are generally considered "less lethal" than brass knuckles. In some jurisdictions, they may be restricted under more general "dangerous weapons" laws; for instance, in New South Wales they are specifically classified as a "prohibited weapon".

In the United States, weighted-knuckle gloves are illegal in the state of Massachusetts. In New York, sap gloves are not specifically denominated as unlawful weapons by state law. However, they may be unlawful to possess with intent to use them unlawfully against another.

In the United Kingdom, weighted-knuckle gloves are legal to buy, sell and own. Possession in a public place would depend on a number of factors. Section 1 Prevention of Crime Act 1953 creates the offence of possession of an offensive weapon in a public place without "lawful authority or reasonable excuse". An offensive weapon is defined in this section as "any article made or adapted for use for causing injury to the person, or intended by the person having it with him for such use by him or by some other person". Weighted-gloves are not an offensive item per se. Therefore, it would depend on whether the possessor is carrying the item with the intention of using it as an offensive weapon (against a person – intention for use against an animal is not an offence). Consideration would also be given to whether the gloves are sold and marketed as a self-defence tool, or whether they are simply designed as something more rigid than normal gloves to protect the hands. The defence to this section is made on the balance of probabilities (civil burden of proof) that the possessor had "lawful authority or reasonable excuse". The CPS website states: "The courts have been reluctant to find many weapons as falling within the first limb of the definition and reliance should usually be placed upon the second. On that basis, it must be shown that the defendant intended to use the article for causing injury".

In the Republic of Ireland, weighted-knuckle gloves are classified as offensive weapons and are illegal to manufacture, import, sell, rent or loan.

== See also ==
- Brass knuckles
- Cestus
- Gauntlet
- Steel-toe boot
