= Cesti =

Cesti may refer to:

- Antonio Cesti (1623–1669), Italian composer
- The plural of cestus, a classical girdle
- The plural of cestus, a classical glove
