= Criminal Justice Act 1988 =

Act of the Parliament of the United Kingdom

Criminal Justice Act 1988 (Note: Section 173.)
- Act of Parliament
- Parliament of the United Kingdom
- Long title: An Act to ... An Act to make fresh provision for extradition; to amend the rules of evidence in criminal proceedings; to provide for the reference by the Attorney General of certain questions relating to sentencing to the Court of Appeal; to amend the law with regard to the jurisdiction and powers of criminal courts, the collection, enforcement and remission of fines imposed by coroners, juries, supervision orders, the detention of children and young persons, probation and the probation service, criminal appeals, anonymity in cases of rape and similar cases, orders under sections 4 and 11 of the Contempt of Court Act 1981 relating to trials on indictment, orders restricting the access of the public to the whole or any part of a trial on indictment or to any proceedings ancillary to such a trial and orders restricting the publication of any report of the whole or any part of a trial on indictment or any such ancillary proceedings, the alteration of names of petty sessions areas, officers of inner London magistrates’ courts and the costs and expenses of prosecution witnesses and certain other persons; to make fresh provision for the payment of compensation by the Criminal Injuries Compensation Board; to make provision for the payment of compensation for a miscarriage of justice which has resulted in a wrongful conviction; to create an offence of torture and an offence of having an article with a blade or point in a public place; to create further offences relating to weapons; to create a summary offence of possession of an indecent photograph of a child; to amend the Police and Criminal Evidence Act 1984 in relation to searches, computer data about fingerprints and bail for persons in customs detention; to make provision in relation to the taking of body samples by the police in Northern Ireland; to amend the Bail Act 1976; to give a justice of the peace power to authorise entry and search of premises for offensive weapons; to provide for the enforcement of the Video Recordings Act 1984 by officers of a weights and measures authority and in Northern Ireland by officers of the Department of Economic Development; to extend to the purchase of easements and other rights over land the power to purchase land conferred on the Secretary of State by section 36 of the Prison Act 1952; and for connected purposes.
- Citation: 1988 c. 33
- Territorial extent: England and Wales; Scotland (in part); Northern Ireland (in part); (Note: Section 172.)

Dates
- Royal assent: 29 July 1988
- Commencement: various (Note: Section 171.)
Other legislation
Amends	Public Bodies Corrupt Practice Act 1889; Prevention of Corruption Act 1906; Children and Young Persons (Scotland) Act 1937; Prevention of Crime Act 1953; Criminal Appeal Act 1968; Theft Act 1968; Misuse of Drugs Act 1971; Juries Act 1974; Bail Act 1976; Protection of Children Act 1978; Criminal Appeal (Northern Ireland) Act 1980; Law Reform (Miscellaneous Provisions) (Scotland) Act 1980; Senior Courts Act 1981
Amended by	Road Traffic (Consequential Provisions) Act 1988; Prevention of Terrorism (Temporary Provisions) Act 1989; Prisons (Scotland) Act 1989; Extradition Act 1989; Tribunals and Inquiries Act 1992; Criminal Justice Act 1993; Probation Service Act 1993; Police and Magistrates' Courts Act 1994; Criminal Justice and Public Order Act 1994; Drug Trafficking Act 1994; Proceeds of Crime Act 1995; Criminal Justice (Scotland) Act 1995; Criminal Appeal Act 1995; Civil Evidence Act 1995; Criminal Procedure (Consequential Provisions) (Scotland) Act 1995; Criminal Injuries Compensation Act 1995; Criminal Justice Act 1988 (Confiscation Orders) Order 1995; Criminal Procedure and Investigations Act 1996; Offensive Weapons Act 1996; Armed Forces Act 1996; Education Act 1996; Proceeds of Crime (Northern Ireland) Order 1996; Criminal Justice Act 1988 (Confiscation Orders) Order 1996; Justices of the Peace Act 1997; Crime (Sentences) Act 1997; Criminal Justice Act 1988 (Designated Countries and Territories) (Amendment) Order 1997; Audit Commission Act 1998; Crime and Disorder Act 1998; Criminal Justice (Terrorism and Conspiracy) Act 1998; Access to Justice Act 1999; Youth Justice and Criminal Evidence Act 1999; Criminal Justice and Police Act 2001; Armed Forces Act 2001; Land Registration Act 2002; Justice (Northern Ireland) Act 2002; Proceeds of Crime Act 2002; Enterprise Act 2002; Crime (International Co-operation) Act 2003; Courts Act 2003; Sexual Offences Act 2003; Criminal Justice Act 2003; Domestic Violence, Crime and Victims Act 2004; Civil Partnership Act 2004; Firearms (Northern Ireland) Order 2004; Courts Act 2003 (Consequential Amendments) Order 2004; Prevention of Terrorism Act 2005; Constitutional Reform Act 2005; Serious Organised Crime and Police Act 2005; Drugs Act 2005; Courts Act 2003 (Consequential Provisions) Order 2005; Police, Public Order and Criminal Justice (Scotland) Act 2006; Violent Crime Reduction Act 2006; Police and Justice Act 2006; Armed Forces Act 2006; Criminal Proceedings etc. (Reform) (Scotland) Act 2007; Custodial Sentences and Weapons (Scotland) Act 2007; Criminal Justice and Immigration Act 2008; Statute Law (Repeals) Act 2008; Criminal Justice (Northern Ireland) Order 2008; Coroners and Justice Act 2009; Policing and Crime Act 2009; Criminal Justice and Licensing (Scotland) Act 2010; Bribery Act 2010; Northern Ireland Act 1998 (Devolution of Policing and Justice Functions) Order 2010; Terrorism Prevention and Investigation Measures Act 2011; Justice Act (Northern Ireland) 2011; Protection of Freedoms Act 2012; Legal Aid, Sentencing and Punishment of Offenders Act 2012; Tribunals, Courts and Enforcement Act 2007 (Consequential Amendments) Order 2012; Statute Law (Repeals) Act 2013; Anti-social Behaviour, Crime and Policing Act 2014; Criminal Justice and Courts Act 2015; Human Trafficking and Exploitation (Criminal Justice and Support for Victims) Act (Northern Ireland) 2015; Counter-Terrorism and Security Act 2015; Insolvency (Northern Ireland) Order 2005 (Consequential Amendments) Order (Northern Ireland) 2015; Debt Relief Act (Northern Ireland) 2010 (Consequential Amendments) Order (Northern Ireland) 2016; Bankruptcy (Scotland) Act 2016 (Consequential Provisions and Modifications) Order 2016; Criminal Justice (European Investigation Order) Regulations 2017; Assaults on Emergency Workers (Offences) Act 2018; Licensing (Amendment) (EU Exit) (Scotland) Regulations 2019; Offensive Weapons Act 2019; Law Enforcement and Security (Amendment) (EU Exit) Regulations 2019; Criminal Justice (Amendment etc.) (EU Exit) Regulations 2019; Coronavirus Act 2020; Sentencing Act 2020; Police, Crime, Sentencing and Courts Act 2022; Criminal Justice Act 2003 (Commencement No. 33) and Sentencing Act 2020 (Commencement No. 2) Regulations 2022; Judicial Review and Courts Act 2022 (Magistrates' Court Sentencing Powers) Regulations 2023; National Security Act 2023 (Consequential Amendments of Primary Legislation) Regulations 2023; Compensation for Miscarriages of Justice (Alteration of Overall Compensation Limits) Order 2025; Victims and Courts Act 2026; Crime and Policing Act 2026; Criminal Justice Act 1988 (Offensive Weapons) (Amendment) (England and Wales) Order 2026

Status: Amended

Text of statute as originally enacted

Revised text of statute as amended

Text of the Criminal Justice Act 1988 as in force today (including any amendments) within the United Kingdom, from legislation.gov.uk.

The Criminal Justice Act 1988 (c. 33) is an act of the Parliament of the United Kingdom.

== Provisions ==
=== Title ===
The title of this act is:

An Act to make fresh provision for extradition; to amend the rules of evidence in criminal proceedings; to provide for the reference by the Attorney General of certain questions relating to sentencing to the Court of Appeal; to amend the law with regard to the jurisdiction and powers of criminal courts, the collection, enforcement and remission of fines imposed by coroners, juries, supervision orders, the detention of children and young persons, probation and the probation service, criminal appeals, anonymity in cases of rape and similar cases, orders under sections 4 and 11 of the Contempt of Court Act 1981 relating to trials on indictment, orders restricting the access of the public to the whole or any part of a trial on indictment or to any proceedings ancillary to such a trial and orders restricting the publication of any report of the whole or any part of a trial on indictment or any such ancillary proceedings, the alteration of names of petty sessions areas, officers of inner London magistrates' courts and the costs and expenses of prosecution witnesses and certain other persons; to make fresh provision for the payment of compensation by the Criminal Injuries Compensation Board; to make provision for the payment of compensation for a miscarriage of justice which has resulted in a wrongful conviction; to create an offence of torture and an offence of having an article with a blade or point in a public place; to create further offences relating to weapons; to create a summary offence of possession of an indecent photograph of a child; to amend the Police and Criminal Evidence Act 1984 in relation to searches, computer data about fingerprints and bail for persons in customs detention; to make provision in relation to the taking of body samples by the police in Northern Ireland; to amend the Bail Act 1976; to give a justice of the peace power to authorise entry and search of premises for offensive weapons; to provide for the enforcement of the Video Recordings Act 1984 by officers of a weights and measures authority and in Northern Ireland by officers of the Department of Economic Development; to extend to the purchase of easements and other rights over land the power to purchase land conferred on the Secretary of State by section 36 of the Prison Act 1952; and for connected purposes.

=== Unduly lenient sentences ===
In England and Wales, the act allows anybody to ask the Attorney General's Office for a sentence they consider unduly lenient to be reviewed; the Office can review sentences given by the Crown Court in England and Wales if requested to. The Attorney General can then, within 28 days of the sentence, decide to refer sentences for certain offences to the Court of Appeal if they consider that the sentence might be unduly lenient. The Court of Appeal will only find a sentence to be unduly lenient, and increase it, if it falls outside the range of sentences which the trial judge could reasonably consider appropriate considering all the relevant information available at the time. This is sometimes called the 'unduly lenient sentence scheme'. This provision entered into force in 1989, and was first applied in July of that year.

The controversially low sentences given to the rapists of Jill Saward were one impetus for the scheme, which was justified as ensuring that public trust in justice was maintained by correcting gross errors; in a 2022 answer to a question in parliament, the Government said that the scheme ensures that punishment is aligned with the severity of the crime and assures victims that "justice will be served". The Law Commission is reviewing the law around criminal appeals and the unduly lenient sentences scheme is within this review's terms of reference, beginning in July 2022 and with a green paper expected in 2023. The scheme has been criticised on the grounds of having become "too politicised", and that "too many cases [are being] referred, in some instances on most unusual grounds".

The included offences are those which are indictable and some either-way offences, which are specified by the secretary of state; the list of applicable either-way offences has been expanded since 1994.

The number of requests made to the Attorney General increased from fewer than 300 in 2001 to 1,006 in 2018, which as of 2021 was the highest number of requests made. However, the number of cases referred by the Attorney General to the Court of Appeal remained within a roughly similar range during that period. The fraction of sentences referred that were found to be unduly lenient also remained roughly between 60% and 90%.

In 2026, a case involving rapes committed by minors was referred to the Attorney General, following criticism across the political spectrum against the use of non-custodial sentences.

=== Section 134 – Torture ===
Section 134 of the act establishes the offence of torture in UK law. The offence is defined as the infliction of severe pain or suffering by "[a] public official or person acting in an official capacity" during the exercise of that person's official duties. Persons acting in an official capacity include members of non-state groups which "exercise functions normally exercised by governments over their civilian population". Torture is an offence of universal jurisdiction, meaning that it can be prosecuted regardless of whether the offence took place in the UK or was committed by a UK national as long as the offender is present in the country. The section creates a defence of "lawful authority, justification or excuse" in cases where the defendant's conduct is legal in the country in which they were serving as an official. This defence has been criticised by human rights campaigners as undermining the UK's obligation to prevent torture under conventions such as the United Nations Convention Against Torture and the European Convention on Human Rights.

The consent of the Attorney General's Office is required to commence a prosecution under this section. As of 2009, there was only one recorded instance of a successful prosecution for torture under the act, that of former militant Faryadi Sarwar Zardad.

=== Section 139 - Knives and exemption ===
Section 139 prohibits the carry of offensive weapons, such as carrying bladed articles in public places. Section 139(5)(b) provides a specific legal defence if the item is carried for certain purposes. While Section 139 made it a blanket offence to carry any fixed or locking blade over 3 inches in public, Subsection 5 explicitly codified defences for work use, religious reasons, and national costume.

Previously, under Section 1 of the Prevention of Crime Act 1953 (1 & 2 Eliz. 2 c. 14), citizens could be tried if they carried an "offensive weapon" in public without lawful authority or reasonable excuse, and this was subject to the interpretation of the common law appropriate to circumstance.

=== Section 141 – Prohibition of offensive weapons ===
This section creates an offence of manufacturing, selling, lending, giving, importing, hiring or exposing for hire offensive weapons, but does not itself define which weapons it applies to. Subsection 141(2) provides the home secretary's power to define them through statutory instrument; the only order currently is the schedule 1 of the Criminal Justice Act 1998 (Offensive Weapons) Order 1988.

Specifically exempted from this section are crossbows and items subject to the Firearms Act 1968.

Various amendments have been made to the Schedule to add new weapons; an August 2016 amendment added zombie knives to the list of prohibited weapons.

=== Section 171 – Commencement ===
The power conferred by section 171(1) has been exercised by the following orders:

- The Criminal Justice Act 1988 (Commencement No. 1) Order 1988 (SI 1988/1408) (C 53)
- The Criminal Justice Act 1988 (Commencement No. 2) Order 1988 (SI 1988/1676) (C 60)
- The Criminal Justice Act 1988 (Commencement No. 3) Order 1988 (SI 1988/1817) (C 65)
- The Criminal Justice Act 1988 (Commencement No. 4) Order 1988 (SI 1988/2073) (C 78)
- The Criminal Justice Act 1988 (Commencement No. 5) Order 1989 (SI 1989/1) (C 1)
- The Criminal Justice Act 1988 (Commencement No. 6) Order 1989 (SI 1989/50) (C 2)
- The Criminal Justice Act 1988 (Commencement No. 7) Order 1989 (SI 1989/264) (C 8)
- The Criminal Justice Act 1988 (Commencement No. 8) Order 1989 (SI 1989/1085) (C 29)
- The Criminal Justice Act 1988 (Commencement No. 9) Order 1989 (SI 1989/1595) (C 55)
- The Criminal Justice Act 1988 (Commencement No. 10) Order 1990 (SI 1990/220) (C 10)
- The Criminal Justice Act 1988 (Commencement No. 11) Order 1990 (SI 1990/1145) (C 32)
- The Criminal Justice Act 1988 (Commencement No. 12) Order 1990 (SI 1990/2084) (C 51)
- The Criminal Justice Act 1988 (Commencement No. 13) Order 1999 (SI 1999/3425) (C 93)
- The Criminal Justice Act 1988 (Commencement No. 14) Order 2004 (SI 2004/2167) (C 90)

== See also ==
- Criminal Justice Act

== Bibliography ==
- Beard, Jacqueline (8 November 2022). Review of Unduly Lenient Sentences (PDF) (Report). House of Commons Library.
