= Boxing glove =

Sports equipment worn by boxers

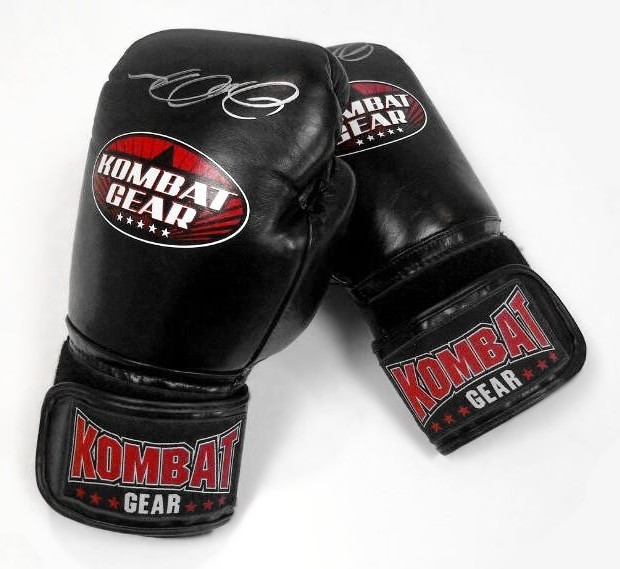
A pair of velcro sparring gloves

Boxing gloves are cushioned gloves that fighters wear on their hands during boxing matches and practices. Unlike "fist-load weapons" (such as the ancient cestus) which were designed as a lethal weapon, modern boxing gloves are non-lethal, designed to protect both the opponent's head and the fighter's hand during a bout. Sparring and other forms of boxing training have their own specialized gloves.

== History ==
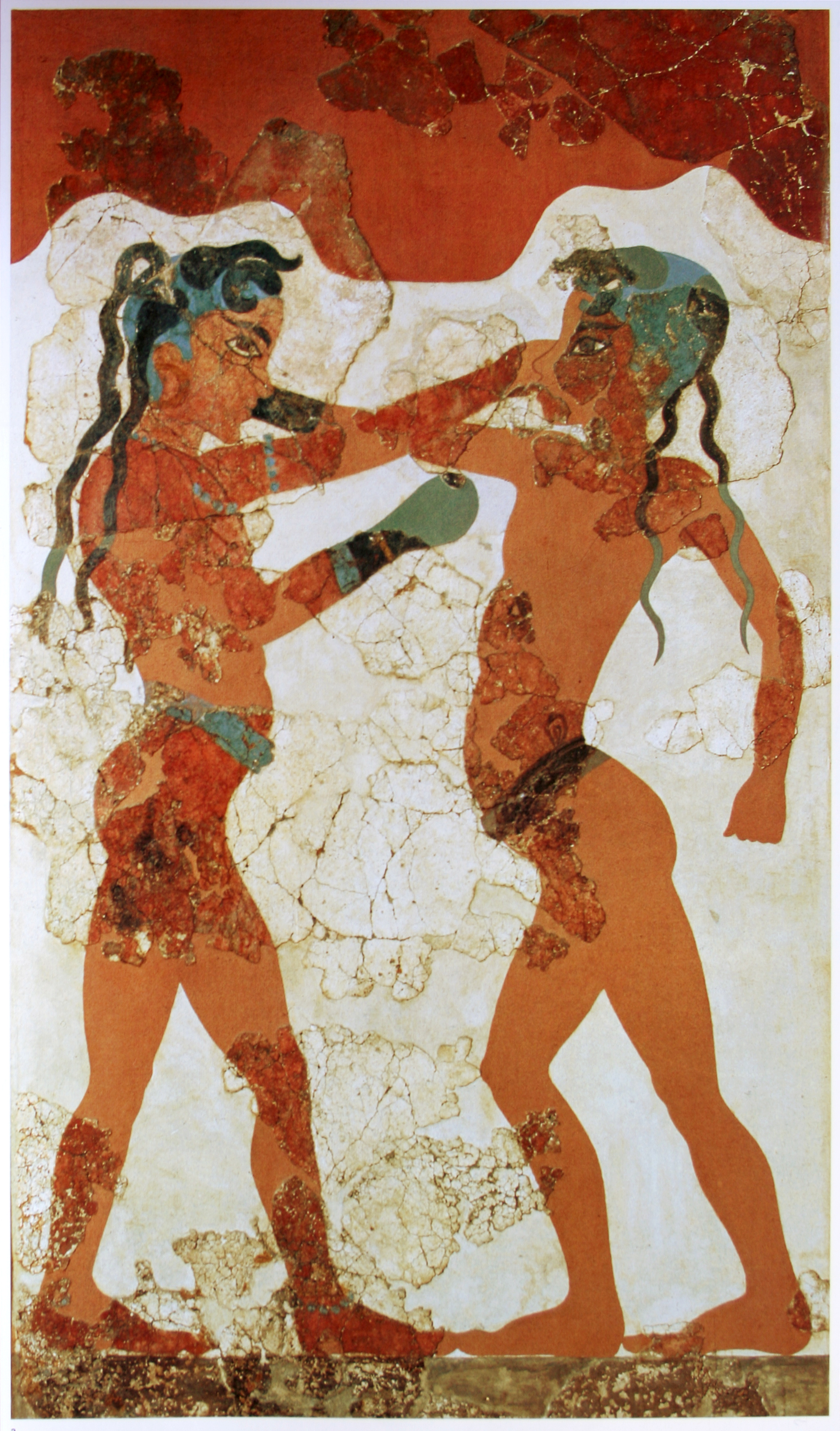
One of the earliest evidences of boxing gloves: a painting of Minoan youths boxing, from an Akrotiri fresco c. 1500 BC.

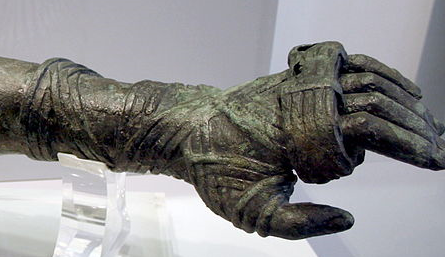
Leather wraps (cestus) represented in bronze. From Ancient Greece, first century BC.

Ancient Middle-Eastern and Egyptian depictions of boxing c. 2000 BC showed contests where fighters had a band supporting the wrist. Early depictions of gloves in boxing date back to Minoan Crete c. 1500 BC. The use of hand protection in fighting contests undertaken for sport has been known since Ancient Greece. However, the gloves were very different from those of modern boxing, as was the sport itself. In Ancient Greece, it was common practice to tie strips of leather round the hands for protection. In Roman times, this developed into the gladiatorial cestus, with metal added to the gloves to inflict greater damage. The oldest surviving example of boxing gloves date to around AD 120, coming in the form of two non-matching leather bands that were recovered from excavations at the Roman fort of Vindolanda. The brutality of the sport caused the boxing to be banned in AD 393.

Boxing experienced a revival in Britain around the 17th century. Many bouts were fought with bare knuckles and with no standard rules until Jack Broughton introduced boxing rules known as Broughton's Law in the 18th century, where the gloves were used for practice purposes only. However, many boxers still chose to fight with bare knuckles until 1867 when gloves were mandated by the Marquess of Queensberry Rules.

Modern boxing gloves started showing up towards the end of the 1890s. Over one hundred years of engineering and testing by some of the biggest boxing manufacturers and sport names have helped create safe, durable equipment. Modern boxing gloves include mesh palm, velcro, leather-based stitching, suspension cushioning and new padding for the boxer. The International Boxing Association approves new designs of gloves according to rules around weight and the amount of leather, padding and support allowed.

== Features ==
Boxing gloves usually come with either lace-ups or velcro. In velcro gloves, the velcro acts as a second handwrap that adds more stability to the wrist. Lace-up gloves provide a more snug and secure fit, but unlike velcro gloves, require assistance from another person to lace, and are usually wrapped with tape before the match. Lace-up gloves can be converted to velcro gloves using a hook and loop converter.

Three types of padding commonly used in boxing gloves are horsehair padding, foam padding or a mix of both. Foam padding gloves use latex and PVC foam with shock absorber. Horsehair gloves last longer than foam padding gloves and are environmentally friendly, but are less protective.

In amateur boxing matches, glove color is restricted to red or blue, often with a white "scoring area" at the knuckles to help judges see and record points from a proper punch.

Boxing gloves are worn over hand wraps, which help stabilize the fist area against injuries such as the eponymous boxer's fracture of the fifth metacarpal. The hand wrap is usually made from cotton and is available in either 120 inches (3,000 mm) or 170 inches (4,300 mm).

== Types of gloves ==
Type	Images	Description	Available size
Bag gloves		A cushioned glove to protect the athlete's hands against heavy strikes on punching bags; these are the gloves not recommended by trainers for any boxing training, especially for non-sparrers.	8 oz (230 g); 10 oz (280 g); 12 oz (340 g); 14 oz (400 g); 16 oz (450 g)
Bag mitts		Mitts are used to add slight protection to the athlete's hands while striking punching bags while simultaneously strengthening the athlete's hands and allowing for the practice of proper, closed-fist punching technique.	2 oz (57 g)
Sparring gloves		Gloves designed to protect both athletes during practice bouts. Usually gloves 2 to 4 oz (57 to 110 g) heavier than competition gloves are selected to spar, to avoid unnecessary injuries. However, in some unique cases of exceptionally strong punching power, gloves of around 20 oz (570 g) could be utilized. Sonny Liston had 22-ounce (620 g) custom-made Everlast gloves, though they barely saved his sparring partners from being knocked out daily. Mike Tyson, while being an amateur, had 18-ounce (510 g) sparring gloves, which also barely protected his sparring partners from his heavy punches.	4 oz (110 g); 6 oz (170 g); 10 oz (280 g); 12 oz (340 g); 14 oz (400 g); 16 oz (450 g); 18 oz (510 g); 20 oz (570 g)
Competition gloves		Gloves designed to protect both athletes during competitions, built according to official regulations. Generally less padded than other glove types. Have white-painted scoring area at the knuckles.	8 oz (230 g) 10 oz (280 g); 12 oz (340 g)
Lace Up gloves	Lace Up boxing gloves	Gloves typically used by professionals in training and competition	8 oz (230 g) 10 oz (280 g); 12 oz (340 g); 14 oz (400 g); 16 oz (450 g)

== Safety ==
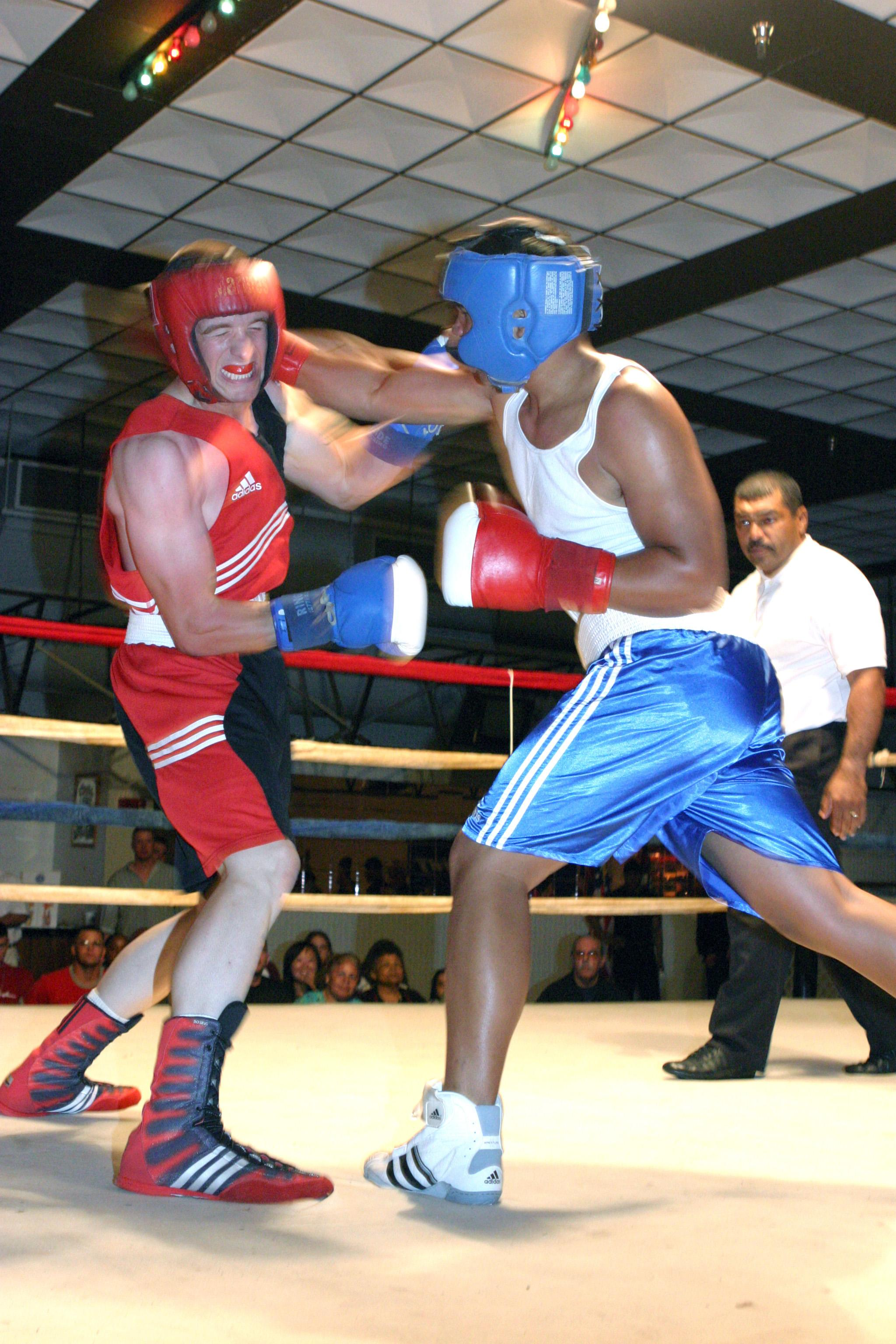
Boxing gloves are mandatory in professional and amateur boxing.

The impact of gloves on the injuries caused during a fight is a controversial issue. Hitting to the head was less common in the bare-knuckle era because of the risk of hurting the boxer's hand. Gloves reduce the number of cuts caused, but a report by the British Medical Association concluded that gloves do not reduce brain injuries and may even increase them, because the main cause of injury is acceleration and deceleration of the head, and fighters wearing gloves are able to punch harder to the head. Gloves may reduce the number of eye injuries, especially if they are thumbless, but retinal tears and detached retinas still occur to boxers wearing modern gloves.

Data for the number of fights and deaths from the bare-knuckle era is incomplete, and there were many differences in rules and medical care. Bare-knuckle boxing matches were usually fought until one fighter could not continue, with bouts sometimes lasting hours, and a few fighters dying after they were carried to their mark to restart the fight when they would otherwise have been unable to continue. (The London Prize Ring Rules later specifically stated that a fighter must "walk to his own side of the scratch unaided" (emphasis added) or lose the fight.) Bare-knuckle rules also allowed grappling and throws, and some deaths were caused by a fighter hitting their head on a stone or rail.

== Illegal modification of boxing gloves ==
On 16 June 1983 at Madison Square Garden, New York City, Luis Resto unexpectedly beat the previously undefeated Billy Collins Jr. An investigation found Resto's gloves had been illegally modified, with padding removed by his trainer, Panama Lewis. As sport journalist Oliver Irish summarized, "Lewis served two years of a six-year prison sentence for assault, conspiracy, tampering with a sports contest and criminal possession of a deadly weapon (Resto's fists)".

== Influence of boxing gloves in other fight sports ==
Open-fingered and open palm MMA gloves or grappling gloves, which are frequently used in mixed martial arts bouts, are not boxing gloves. Similar to the wrist-supporting, closed-thumb, broken-knuckle kempo gloves popularized by Bruce Lee's 1973 movie Enter the Dragon, they provide some padding to the person wearing the glove, but leave the fingers and the palm area open and available for intricate wrestling and grappling maneuvers such as clinch fighting, which are illegal in the sport of modern boxing.

== See also ==
- Cestus (boxing)
- Headgear (martial arts)
- MMA gloves
