= 1746 to 1750 in sports =

Events in world sport through the years 1746 to 1750.

== Boxing ==
Events

- 1746 — Jack Slack defeated several opponents in provincial rings until 1747.
- 1746 or 1747 — Slack had a fight against Tom Aguer in a bout at New Buckingham, but the outcome is unknown.
- February 1747 — Jack Broughton introduced mufflers (early boxing gloves), based on the ancient cestus, for use in sparring contests only; matches remained bare-knuckle.
- 1748 — Jack Slack (who was known as the "Norfolk Butcher") sold his butcher shop to his brother and moved to London.
- 12 October 1748 — Slack defeated Ned Hunt in a 40 minute 8th round fight in London.
- 1749 — Slack opened a School of Boxing in Bristol.
- 1749 — Slack defeated John James in a 4 minute 1st round fight.
- 9 February 1749 — Slack defeated Sailor Field in a 1 hour 32 minute fight in London.
- 31 January 1750 — George Taylor defeated Jack Slack at London in 25 minute 17 round fight.
- 11 April 1750 — Broughton challenged for his title by Jack Slack. After 14 minutes and in the fourth round, Broughton was blinded by swelling around his eyes and could not continue. Slack became the new English champion until 1760 even though George Taylor reclaimed the title after Slack refused to fight him but after he had already beaten Broughton.

== Chess ==
Events

- 1749 — François-André Danican Philidor published Analyse du jeu des Échecs, one of the most famous books on chess theory, which becomes a standard manual. Philidor himself is regarded as the strongest European player to 1775.

== Cricket ==
Events

- 1745 to 1748 — single wicket cricket became increasingly popular and was the main form of cricket in England during this decade with lucrative contests taking place at the Artillery Ground in particular.

== Horse racing ==
Events

- c.1750 — Formation of the Jockey Club to establish rules for British racing.

== Hurling ==
The Provinces of Leinster and Munster meet in two matches on Crumlin Commons in May 1748. Leinster win the first match, with Munster seeking a replay the week after, which is also won by Leinster after about an hour.

Two matches were claimed to have been held by Irishmen in Paris in 1750, the second at the request of Louis XV

== Sources ==
- Bowen, Rowland (1970). Cricket: A History of its Growth and Development. Eyre & Spottiswoode.
- Buckley, G. B. (1935). Fresh Light on 18th Century Cricket. Cotterell.
- Maun, Ian (2009). From Commons to Lord's, Volume One: 1700 to 1750. Roger Heavens. ISBN 978-1-900592-52-9.
- McCann, Tim (2004). Sussex Cricket in the Eighteenth Century. Sussex Record Society.
- Waghorn, H. T. (1906). The Dawn of Cricket. Electric Press.
