= 2026 United Kingdom rape sentencing controversy =

British political controversy

In May 2026, three teenage boys were sentenced at Southampton Crown Court for offences relating to two sexual assaults which took place in the town of Fordingbridge, Hampshire. The victims were aged 14 and 15 at the time of the offences, and the offenders were aged between 13 and 15. The assaults were filmed, and one allegedly involved the use of a knife, though the sentencing judge stated that he was "sure that did not happen". Two of the boys carried out the assaults, while the third filmed them. Judge Nicholas Rowland sentenced all three offenders to youth rehabilitation orders, a non-custodial sentence, stating that he wanted to "avoid criminalising these children unnecessarily" and telling the offenders that "none of you need to go to prison today". The case was referred to the Court of Appeal by the Attorney General under the unduly lenient sentence scheme and is under review by the court as of July 2026.

Following the ruling, a petition was launched calling for the judge to be investigated and for a 'formal judicial accountability framework' to be introduced. As of June 2026, the petition had received more than 200,000 signatures.

== Circumstances ==
The first incident occurred in November 2024, when a 15-year-old girl arranged to go on a date with one of the boys, but was instead taken to an underpass beside the River Avon where she was raped by two of them. A recorded video captured 90 minutes of the assault and was later posted on social media. The second incident occurred two months later in January 2025, when a 14-year-old girl separated from her friends was allegedly threatened at knife-point. After being forced to leave her mobile phone and AirTag in a shop, she was raped by two of the boys in a field while the other filmed and encouraged the attack.

== Sentencing ==
- The first teenager was convicted of two counts of rape and one count of taking indecent images of a child and sentenced to three-year youth rehabilitation.
- The second teenager was convicted on six counts of rape and sentenced to three-year youth rehabilitation.
- The third teenager was convicted of two counts of rape and sentenced to 18-month youth rehabilitation

== Arguments ==
Regarding the defendants, the sentencing judge Nicholas Rowland stated at the sentencing hearing that "The children and young people guidelines" state that "For a child or young person the sentence should focus on rehabilitation where possible" and so "I should avoid criminalising these children unnecessarily and encourage them to take responsibility for their actions". He described the intellectual impairments of all three perpetrators in his remarks.

One of the victims stated her distress on discovering the lenient sentences. British politicians across the political spectrum expressed concern at the leniency of their sentences. The Prime Minister Keir Starmer stated that the sentencing would be reviewed by government law officers under the unduly lenient sentences scheme, which can refer sentences for certain offences to the Court of Appeal using powers created by the Criminal Justice Act 1988. The case was subsequently referred to the Court of Appeal.

Gisele Pelicot said that she was deeply shocked by the case and called for justice to take its course.

== Court of Appeal ==
On 1st July 2026, the hearing started in the Court of Appeal, with both sides presenting opening arguments. The court's deliberation resulted in the sentences of the two boys who physically raped the victims being increased to four years' detention. The other boy, who had not physically raped either of the girls but had encouraged the others to do so in the second attack, had his sentence unchanged. All three were given lifetime restraining orders preventing them from contacting either of their victims.
