= Police and Criminal Evidence Act 1984 =

Act of the Parliament of the United Kingdom

Police and Criminal Evidence Act 1984 (Note: Section 122.)
- Act of Parliament
- Parliament of the United Kingdom
- Long title: An Act to make further provision in relation to the powers and duties of the police, persons in police detention, criminal evidence, police discipline and complaints against the police; to provide for arrangements for obtaining the views of the community on policing and for a rank of deputy chief constable; to amend the law relating to the Police Federations and Police Forces and Police Cadets in Scotland; and for connected purposes.
- Citation: 1984 c. 60
- Territorial extent: England and Wales (Note: Section 120.)

Dates
- Royal assent: 31 October 1984
- Commencement: various (Note: Section 122.)
Other legislation
Amends	Unlawful Drilling Act 1819; Metropolitan Police Act 1839; London Hackney Carriages Act 1843; Town Police Clauses Act 1847; Parks Regulation Act 1872; Explosive Substances Act 1883; Infant Life (Preservation) Act 1929; Prevention of Crime Act 1953; Sexual Offences Act 1956; Obscene Publications Act 1959; Matrimonial Causes Act 1965; Criminal Law Act 1967; Courts-Martial (Appeals) Act 1968; Theft Act 1968; Conservation of Seals Act 1970; Misuse of Drugs Act 1971; Biological Weapons Act 1974; Protection of Children Act 1978; Public Passenger Vehicles Act 1981; Criminal Attempts Act 1981
Repeals/revokes	Canals (Offences) Act 1840
Amended by	Sexual Offences Act 1985; Representation of the People Act 1985; Drug Trafficking Offences Act 1986; Public Order Act 1986; Legal Aid Act 1988; Road Traffic (Consequential Provisions) Act 1988; Prevention of Terrorism (Temporary Provisions) Act 1989; Official Secrets Act 1989; Football (Offences) Act 1991; Deer Act 1991; Criminal Justice Act 1993; Statute Law (Repeals) Act 1993; Value Added Tax Act 1994; Drug Trafficking Act 1994; Police Act 1996; Crime and Disorder Act 1998; Football (Offences and Disorder) Act 1999; Youth Justice and Criminal Evidence Act 1999; Countryside and Rights of Way Act 2000; Criminal Justice and Police Act 2001; Anti-terrorism, Crime and Security Act 2001; Statute Law (Repeals) Act 2004; Domestic Violence, Crime and Victims Act 2004; Prevention of Terrorism Act 2005; Drugs Act 2005; Electoral Administration Act 2006; Violent Crime Reduction Act 2006; Statute Law (Repeals) Act 2008; Counter-Terrorism Act 2008; Terrorism Prevention and Investigation Measures Act 2011; Protection of Freedoms Act 2012; Criminal Justice and Courts Act 2015; Policing and Crime Act 2017; Space Industry Act 2018; Counter-Terrorism and Border Security Act 2019; Offensive Weapons Act 2019; Sentencing Act 2020; Domestic Abuse Act 2021; National Security Act 2023; Employment Rights Act 2025
Relates to	Serious Organised Crime and Police Act 2005; Police (Detention and Bail) Act 2011

Status: Amended

Text of statute as originally enacted

Revised text of statute as amended

Text of the Police and Criminal Evidence Act 1984 as in force today (including any amendments) within the United Kingdom, from legislation.gov.uk.

The Police and Criminal Evidence Act 1984 (c. 60) (PACE) is an act of the Parliament of the United Kingdom which instituted a legislative framework for the powers of police officers in England and Wales to combat crime, and provided codes of practice for the exercise of those powers. Part VI of PACE required the Home Secretary to issue Codes of Practice governing police powers. The aim of PACE is to establish a balance between the powers of the police in England and Wales and the rights and freedoms of the public. Equivalent provision is made for Northern Ireland by the Police and Criminal Evidence (Northern Ireland) Order 1989 (SI 1989/1341). The equivalent in Scots Law is the Criminal Procedure (Scotland) Act 1995.

PACE also sets out responsibilities and powers that can be utilised by non-sworn members of the Police i.e. PCSOs, by members of the public or other government agencies e.g. FSA officers, the armed forces, HMRC officers, et al.

PACE established the role of the appropriate adult (AA) in England and Wales. It describes the AA role as "to safeguard the rights, entitlements and welfare of juveniles and vulnerable persons to whom the provisions of this and any other Code of Practice apply".

== Background ==
The Maxwell Confait murder and the subsequent Fisher Inquiry (chaired by Henry Fisher) were the key events leading to the setting up of the Royal Commission on Criminal Procedure. That Royal Commission led to the introduction of the PACE legislation.

Prior to PACE police interrogation and detention was governed by Judges' Rules and in the Fisher Inquiry it was reported that these were breached. PACE introduced clear direction and governance on how police could treat and interrogate detained persons. Codes of Practice were issued detailing how detained persons were to be treated.

Prior to the introduction of PACE, police relied on stop and search powers that were 'piecemeal'. Such powers included those within the Vagrancy Act 1824, which developed 'sus' laws. These powers allowed police to stop a person found 'loitering' in a public place, if they suspected they had an intention to commit an offence, rather than a belief that they had committed an offence.

The Scarman report found that black people were having 'stop and search' powers disproportionately used against them. A notable example of this was at the 1976 Notting Hill Carnival, where there was a perceived threat of 'black' crime, resulting in the police justifying using 'sus' laws inappropriately, including 'flooding' resources into the area. This resulted in violence.

In 1979, the government appointed a Royal Commission on Criminal Procedure, with Sir Cyril Phillips noting that in the 20th century, no review had been complete of police processes.

In 1981, the Royal Commission reported how stop and search powers had been used in an 'unsatisfactory' manner. The report proposed that across England and Wales, there should be powers and safeguards that were uniform, with the aim being to reduce the level of searches that were random and discriminatory.

The purpose of PACE was to unify police powers under one code of practice and to balance carefully the rights of the individual against the powers of the police.

== Synopsis ==
Although PACE is a fairly wide-ranging piece of legislation, it mainly deals with police powers to search an individual or premises, including their powers to gain entry to those premises, the handling of exhibits seized from those searches, and the treatment of suspects once they are in custody, including being interviewed. Specific legislation as to more wide-ranging conduct of a criminal investigation is contained within the Criminal Procedures and Investigation Act 1996.

Criminal liability may arise if the specific terms of the act itself are not conformed to, whereas failure to conform to the codes of practice while searching, arresting, detaining or interviewing a suspect may lead to evidence obtained during the process becoming inadmissible in court.

PACE also introduces various Codes of Practice, one of the most notable being Code G, which provides that an arrest without a warrant can only be lawful if the necessity test contained within Code G is satisfied.

PACE was significantly modified by the Serious Organised Crime and Police Act 2005. This replaced nearly all existing powers of arrest, including the category of arrestable offences, with a new general power of arrest for all offences.

PACE is applicable not only to police officers but to anyone with conduct of a criminal investigation including Her Majesty's Revenue and Customs and to military investigations conducted by service police. Any person with a duty of investigating criminal offences or charging offenders is also required to follow the provisions of the PACE codes of practice as far as practical and relevant.

Despite its safeguards, PACE was extremely controversial on its introduction, and reviews have also been controversial, as the act was thought to give considerable extra powers to the police.

With the conjunction of the Inland Revenue and HM Customs and Excise into Her Majesty's Revenue and Customs (HMRC), HMRC essentially gained extra powers since Customs and Excise had a statutory right of entry into a private dwelling, that is to say they were allowed to break and enter without reason, but the Inland Revenue did not. PACE and its subsequent enactments limits that.

== Notable sections ==
=== Part I – Powers to stop and search ===
Part I provides police powers to stop and search a person or vehicle.

==== Section 1 – Power of constable to stop and search persons, vehicles etc ====
Notably, Section 1 outlines that a constable has a power to search any person or vehicle for stolen or prohibited articles, including:

- Offensive weapons (an item made, intended or adapted for use as a weapon)
- Fireworks (possessed in contravention of a prohibition imposed by fireworks regulations, e.g. Fireworks Act 2003)
- Prohibited items (used in the commission of the offences of):
  - Burglary
  - Theft
  - Taking a vehicle without consent (s. 12 Theft Act 1968)
  - Fraud (s. 1 Fraud Act 2006)
  - Criminal damage (s. 1 Criminal Damage Act 1971)
  - Wilful obstruction (s. 137 Highways Act 1980)
  - Intentionally or recklessly causing public nuisance (s. 78 Police, Crime, Sentencing and Courts Act 2022 (PCSCA 2022))
  - Causing serious disruption by tunnelling (s. 3 PCSCA 2022)
  - Causing serious disruption by being present in a tunnel (s. 4 PCSCA 2022)
  - Obstruction etc. of major transport works (s. 6 PCSCA 2022)
  - Interference with use or operation of key national infrastructure (s. 7 PCSCA 2022)

=== Part II – Powers of entry, search and seizure ===
Part II of the act relates to the police's powers in relation to entering and searching a location, as well as the seizure of items

==== Search warrants ====
===== Section 8 – Power of justice of the peace to authorise entry and search of premises =====
This section provides that a constable can make an application for a warrant to a justice of the peace to enter and seize items from a premises, on the reasonable grounds they believe:

- An indictable offence has been committed
- There is material on the premises with substantial value to the investigation of that offence and that evidence is also relevant
- The evidence does not include items subject to legal privilege, excluded material or special procedure (e.g. letters between a person and a solicitor)
- That it is not practicable for police to gain entry by communicating with a person who can provide them access or that they could, but doing so would not be practicable (e.g. a person may destroy evidence if they were aware of the police's search)
- That police will not gain entry unless a warrant is issued or the purpose of the search would be interrupted unless they can enter the premises immediately

==== Entry and search without search warrant ====
===== Section 17 – Entry for purpose of arrest etc =====
This provides that a constable can enter a premises under the following circumstances, if they are:

- Executing a warrant in relation to criminal proceedings or enforcing the payment of sums (under s. 76 of the Magistrates' Courts Act 1980)
- Arresting a person for an indictable offence
- Arresting a person 'unlawfully at large', who is liable to be detained in prison, young offender institution, secure training centre or college or arresting a child or young person guilty of 'grave crimes' (s. 260 Sentencing Act 2020)
- Arresting (e.g. recapturing) a person unlawfully at large (e.g. escaped from lawful custody)
- Saving life or limb
- Preventing serious damage to property
- Arresting any child or young person who has been remanded (whether to local authority accommodation or youth detention)
- Arresting a person for:
  - Prohibition of uniforms in connection with political objects (Public Order Act 1936)
  - Offences relating to entering and remaining on property (ss. 6–8 Criminal Law Act 1977)
  - Fear or provocation of violence (s. 4 Public Order Act 1986)
  - Driving etc. when under the influence of drink or drugs (s. 4 Road Traffic Act 1988)
  - Failing to stop a motor vehicle when required to do so by a constable in uniform (s. 163 Road Traffic Act 1988)
  - Offences involving drink or drugs (s. 27 Transport and Works Act 1992)
  - Failure to comply with interim possession order (s. 76 Criminal Justice and Public Order Act 1994)
  - Offences relating to the prevention of harm to animals (ss. 4, 5, 6(1) and (2), 7 and 8(1) and (2) Animal Welfare Act 2006)
  - Squatting in a residential building (s. 144 Legal Aid, Sentencing and Punishment of Offenders Act 2012)
  - The landing or attempted landing, importation or attempted importation through the Channel Tunnel, of any animal that has been prohibited to prevent the introduction of rabies into Great Britain (s. 61(2)(a) Animal Health Act 1981)
  - Failing to have control or be in charge of any vessel or boat to prevent the introduction of rabies into Great Britain (s. 61(2)(b) Animal Health Act 1981)
  - Moving any animal into, within or out of a place or area to be declared to be infected with rabies (s. 61(2)(c) Animal Health Act 1981)
  - Failing to attend a police station at a specified time to answer bail (s. 30D(1) or (2A) Police and Criminal Evidence Act 1984)
  - Failing to answer bail (s. 46A(1) or (1A) Police and Criminal Evidence Act 1984)
  - Failure to surrender to custody in accordance with a court order (s. 5B(7) Bail Act 1976)
  - On bail and not likely to surrender to custody (s. 7(3) Bail Act 1976)
  - A child suspected of breaking conditions of remand (s. 97(1) Legal Aid, Sentencing and Punishment of Offenders Act 2012)

This section additionally abolished all powers of a constable under common law to enter a location, except to deal with or to prevent a breach of the peace.

==== Section 18 – Entry and search after arrest ====
This section provides that a constable may enter the premises of a person who has been arrested for an indictable offence, if they reasonably suspect that there is evidence that relates to the offence they have been arrested for or another indictable offence, connected with or similar to that offence.

A constable cannot use this power unless authorised by an officer at the rank of inspector or above. This authorisation may be at the time or afterwards, where a constable must inform an authorising officer as soon as practicable.

==== Seizure etc. ====
===== Section 19 – General power of seizure etc =====
This section provides that police have a general power of seizure, if they are lawfully on a premises. They may seize anything they reasonably believe has been obtained as a result of an offence having been committed (e.g. stolen property or drugs) and that it is necessary to seize it to prevent its concealment, loss, damage, alteration or destruction (e.g. drugs being hidden and therefore evidence being lost). This does not include items of legal privilege, even if an officer believes that seizure would guarantee its safety.

===== Section 22 – Retention =====
This section provides that police may retain an item seized under section 19 as long as they require, so long as it is necessary in all the circumstances, such as for evidence at court, for further investigation, e.g. forensic examination or to ascertain the lawful owner of the item (if there are reasonable grounds to believe the item was obtained as the result of an offence).

This section does not allow for any items seized for a person that is not evidential to be retained when they are no longer in custody.

=== Part III – Arrest ===
==== Section 24 – Arrest without warrant: constables ====
This section provides that a constable may arrest a person, without requiring a warrant if:

- the person is about to commit an offence
- the person is in the act of committing an offence
- the constable reasonably suspects the person is about to commit an offence
- the constable reasonably suspects the person is committing an offence
- the constable reasonably suspects the person is guilty of an offence, if the constable reasonably suspects an offence has been committed
- the constable reasonably suspects the person is guilty of an offence, if the offence has in fact been committed

For these powers to be available, the constable must have reasonable grounds to believe that it is necessary to arrest the person in order to:

- Ascertain their name or address
- Prevent them from:
  - Causing physical injury to themselves or another person
  - Suffering physical injury
  - Causing loss of or damage to property
  - Committing an offence against public decency (if members of the public going about 'normal business' cannot 'reasonably be expected to avoid the person')
  - Causing an unlawful obstruction of the highway
- Protect a child or other vulnerable person from the person
- Allow the prompt and effective investigation of the offence or of the conduct of the person
- Prevent prosecution being hindered by the person disappearing

==== Section 24A – Arrest without warrant: other persons ====
This section codifies the law of what was previously termed citizen's arrest, providing that a person who is not a constable (such as a member of the public) can arrest a person in certain circumstances. Specifically, a member of the public may arrest a person who is in the act of committing an indictable offence or whom they reasonably suspect is committing an indictable offence, as well as a person guilty of an offence or whom the member of the public reasonably suspects to be guilty of committing the offence. The power can only be exercised if they reasonably believe it is necessary to

- prevent them causing or suffering physical injury,
- prevent them causing loss of or damage to property, or
- prevent them from making off before a constable can assume responsibility for them.

Originally the codification of arrest by any person was in section 24 and applied to arrestable offences. The Serious Organised Crime and Police Act 2005 abolished that classification.

==== Section 28 – Information to be given on arrest ====
This section provides that when a person is arrested, as soon as it is reasonably practicable, they should be provided with information regarding their arrest. This includes:

- That they are under arrest
- The ground of the arrest (for example, telling a person that CCTV had caught them stealing an item from a shop, giving the ground of the arrest for theft).

==== Section 29 – Voluntary attendance at police station etc ====
This section provides information about what should happen when a person attends a voluntary interview. Voluntary interviews are conducted similar to a person who has been arrested, except they are arranged at a date, time and place after an offence has occurred, where arrest is either not possible (due to necessity criteria not being made out), or on the officer's decision.

Despite being called a 'voluntary' interview, a person could be subject to arrest if they fail to attend the interview, as the purpose of such an interview is to assist police with their investigation.

The section explains that a person must be told that they are able to leave the interview at any time (unless they are arrested) and that if a police officer decides to arrest them, the person must be informed that they are under arrest.

==== Section 31 – Arrest for further offence ====
This section provides that when a person has been arrested and is at a police station regarding that offence and another offence is discovered that he would be arrested for, a constable shall arrest him for that other offence.

For example, it may be that a person is initially arrested on suspicion of theft from a shop, where CCTV later emerges whilst they are in custody of them stealing from another shop before their arrest. Subsequently, they would be arrested for that previous shoplifting.

==== Section 32 – Search upon arrest ====
This section provides that a constable, having established reasonable grounds, may search an arrested person, in any place other than a police station (which is covered by s. 54).

The search can only be conducted if the constable reasonably believes that the arrested person may present a danger to themselves or others, allowing a constable to search them for items that may assist them from escaping from lawful custody or that may be evidence relating to an offence.

If a person has been arrested for an indictable offence, then the officer may enter and search any premises they were in immediately before they were arrested, to search for evidence in relation to the offence they have been arrested for.

=== Part V – Questioning and treatment of persons by police ===
==== Section 54 ====
This section provides that a custody officer at a police station is responsible for ascertaining all the items an arrested person has on them, with these items being recorded.

The custody officer may seize and retain any of the items. Clothes and other personal items may only be seized if the custody officer believes the person they are seized from may use the clothing or items to:

- cause physical injury to himself or anyone else
- damage property
- interfere with evidence; or
- assist them in escaping

The custody officer may also seize an item if they have reasonable grounds to believe that the item may be evidence that relates to an offence.

An arrested person must be told the reason for items being seized, unless they are violent or likely to become violent or are incapable of understanding information explained to them.

Pre-charge bail was reformed in 2022 by schedule 4 of the Police, Crime, Sentencing and Courts Act 2022 (PCSC):

- removing the presumption against pre-charge bail ('police bail') which had been introduced only a few years earlier in 2017,
- introducing requirements and guidance that the police must consider,
- extending the period for which the police themselves could authorize bail to nine months in total,
- lowering the rank of police officer required for extensions: Inspector for extension from three months to six, and Superintendent for extension from six months to nine; further extension can only be granted by a court.

The earlier Policing and Crime Act 2017 reforms to PACE pre-charge bail had been hoped to speed up justice, but instead had led to a large increase in the number of people arrested being 'released under investigation' ('RUI'). With no bail conditions, no time constraints, no rights for updates about the case for those involved, this gave no timely justice for the aggrieved nor for those arrested, no protection for alleged victims and the public, and those arrested remained under a cloud of suspicion for long periods without charge. The guilty could keep offending, and did so with some devastating consequences, and the innocent could not clear their names. The 2022 reforms were intended to address these problems.

== PACE codes of practice ==
The Home Office and the Cabinet Office announced a joint review of PACE and its codes of practice in May 2002, and on 31 July 2004, new PACE Codes of Practice came into effect. Following a further review in 2010, PACE Codes A, B and D were re-issued to take effect on 7 March 2011.

- PACE Code A: deals with the exercise by police officers of statutory powers to search a person or a vehicle without first making an arrest. It also deals with the need for a police officer to make a record of such a stop or encounter. On 1 January 2009, Code A was amended to remove lengthy stop and account recording procedures, requiring police to only record a subject's ethnicity and to issue them with a receipt.
- PACE Code B: deals with police powers to search premises and to seize and retain property found on premises and persons.
- PACE Code C: sets out the requirements for the detention, treatment and questioning of people in police custody by police officers. It replaced the Judges' Rules in England and Wales.
- PACE Code D: concerns the main methods used by the police to identify people in connection with the investigation of offences and the keeping of accurate and reliable criminal records.
- PACE Code E: deals with the tape recording of interviews with suspects in the police station.
- PACE Code F: deals with the visual recording with sound of interviews with suspects.

On 1 January 2006 an additional code came into force:

- PACE Code G: deals with statutory powers of arrest.

On 24 July 2006 a further code came into force:

- PACE Code H: deals with the detention of terrorism suspects.

== Case law ==
In the case of Osman v Southwark Crown Court (1999), the search of Osman was held to be unlawful because the officers searching him did not give their names and station, contrary to PACE's requirements.

In O'Loughlin v Chief Constable of Essex (1997), the courts held that the entry of a premises under section 17 PACE to arrest O'Loughlin's wife for criminal damage was unlawful because under PACE, anyone present on the premises must be given the reason for entry.

In the case of Christopher James Miller v Director of Public Prosecutions (2018) Mr. Miller's conviction for drug driving was quashed because West Midlands Police had breached Code C of PACE by not providing an appropriate adult, despite him telling officers that he had Asperger's syndrome and being aware from his previous interactions that he had Asperger's.

In 2012, a vulnerable 11-year-old girl, referred to as Child H, with a neurological disability similar to autism was denied an appropriate adult at Crawley Police Station after she was arrested in Horsham on four separate occasions for minor offences between February and March 2012. Sussex Police referred her complaint to the Independent Police Complaints Commission (IPCC), who found the denial of a responsible adult to be a breach of PACE Code C. The police accepted the IPCC recommendations.

However, not all cases have gone against the police; in R v Longman (1988), it was held that the police entry of a premises to execute a search warrant for drugs was lawful, although deception had been utilised to gain entry, and, upon entering, the police had not identified themselves or shown the warrant.

== See also ==
- Computer forensics
- Police and Criminal Evidence (Northern Ireland) Order 1989
