= Arrestable offence =

Arrestable offence is a legal term now obsolete in English law and the legal system of Northern Ireland, but still used in the legal system of the Republic of Ireland. The Criminal Law Act 1967 introduced the category to replace the ancient term felony. That Act was superseded by the Police and Criminal Evidence Act 1984, which over the next two decades was itself significantly amended to increase police powers of arrest, relating in particular to entry, search following arrest and to custody. In England and Wales, the category "arrestable offence" ceased to exist with the coming into force on 1 January 2006 of the Serious Organised Crime and Police Act 2005. In Northern Ireland, it ceased to exist with the coming into force of the Police and Criminal Evidence (Amendment) (Northern Ireland) Order 2007. In the Republic of Ireland, the Criminal Law Act 1997 abolished the terms felony and misdemeanour and created the term "arrestable offence" in their place.

== England and Wales ==
=== Definition ===
Section 24 of the Police and Criminal Evidence Act 1984 defined an arrestable offence as:

- An offence for which the sentence is fixed by law; e.g. murder.
- Offences for which a person 18 years old or older, who had not previously been convicted, could be sentenced to a term of 5 years or more. This constituted the vast majority of offences, including rape, theft, serious assault, burglary and criminal damage.
- Offences that were listed in Schedule 1A of the Act, which contained a long list of offences that do not attract a 5-year sentence but were considered to require the powers an 'Arrestable Offence' designation confers. Examples included possession of an offensive weapon, ticket touting and driving whilst disqualified.

=== Other arrest powers ===
In addition to being able to arrest for an arrestable offence as defined above, section 25 provided further powers of arrest for "non-arrestable offences" in certain circumstances. This had no equivalent in the original 1967 legislation. They were as follows:

1. that the name of the relevant person is unknown to, and cannot be readily ascertained by, the constable,
2. that the constable has reasonable grounds for doubting whether a name furnished by the relevant person as his name is his real name,
3. that:
  1. the relevant person has failed to furnish a satisfactory address for service, or
  2. the constable has reasonable grounds for doubting whether an address furnished by the relevant person is a satisfactory address for service,
4. that the constable has reasonable grounds for believing that arrest is necessary to prevent the relevant person:
  1. causing physical injury to himself or any other person,
  2. suffering physical injury,
  3. causing loss of or damage to property,
  4. committing an offence against public decency (where members of the public going about their normal business cannot reasonably be expected to avoid the person to be arrested), or
  5. causing an unlawful obstruction of the highway,
5. that the constable has reasonable grounds for believing that arrest is necessary to protect a child or other vulnerable person from the relevant person.

=== Replacement ===
With the increasing number of newly created offences being included in Schedule 1A and thus being made arrestable, the Serious Organised Crime and Police Act 2005 abolished the category of arrestable offence, replacing the dual rules with a single set of criteria for all offences. The question now for police is whether it is "necessary" to arrest the relevant person, by reference to various broadly-drafted statutory criteria. The general arrest conditions are:

1. that:
  1. the name of the relevant person is unknown to, and cannot be readily ascertained by, the constable,
  2. the constable has reasonable grounds for doubting whether a name furnished by the relevant person as his name is his real name,
2. that:
  1. the relevant person has failed to furnish a satisfactory address for service, or
  2. the constable has reasonable grounds for doubting whether an address furnished by the relevant person is a satisfactory address for service,
3. that the constable has reasonable grounds for believing that arrest is necessary to prevent the relevant person:
  1. causing physical injury to himself or any other person,
  2. suffering physical injury,
  3. causing loss of or damage to property,
  4. committing an offence against public decency, or
  5. causing an unlawful obstruction of the highway,
4. that the constable has reasonable grounds for believing that arrest is necessary to protect a child or other vulnerable person from the relevant person.
5. that the constable has reasonable grounds for believing that arrest is necessary to allow the prompt and effective investigation of the offence or of the conduct of the person in question, or
6. that the constable has reasonable grounds for believing that arrest is necessary to prevent any prosecution for the offence from being hindered by the disappearance of the person in question.

== Northern Ireland ==
=== Definition ===
Section 24 of the Police and Criminal Evidence (Northern Ireland) Order 1989 defined an arrestable offence as:

- An offence for which the sentence was fixed by law; i.e. murder.
- an offence for which a person of 21 years of age or over (not previously convicted) may be sentenced to imprisonment for a term of five years (or might be so sentenced but for the restrictions imposed by Article 46(4) of the Magistrates' Courts (Northern Ireland) Order 1981), and
- offences that were listed in that Article of the Order.

A constable may also have arrested for an offence if the conditions of Article 27 were satisfied.

=== Replacement ===
The powers to arrest under the 1987 Order were replaced by near-identical criteria as for England and Wales. A constable may arrest for any offence if the conditions below are satisfied:

1. to enable the name of the person in question to be ascertained (in the case where the constable does not know, and cannot readily ascertain, the person's name, or has reasonable grounds for doubting whether a name given by the person as his name is his real name);
2. correspondingly as regards the person's address,
3. to prevent the person in question:
  1. causing physical injury to himself or any other person,
  2. suffering physical injury,
  3. causing loss of or damage to property,
  4. committing an offence against public decency, or
  5. causing an unlawful obstruction on a road (within the meaning of the Road Traffic (Northern Ireland) Order 1995,
4. to protect a child or other vulnerable person from the person in question,
5. to allow the prompt and effective investigation of the offence or of the conduct of the person in question, or
6. to prevent any prosecution for the offence from being hindered by the disappearance of the person in question.

== Republic of Ireland ==
=== Definition ===
Section 2 of the Criminal Law Act, 1997 defines an arrestable offence as follows:

- "arrestable offence" means an offence for which a person of full capacity and not previously convicted may, under or by virtue of any enactment or the common law, be punished by imprisonment for a term of five years or by a more severe penalty and includes an attempt to commit any such offence

== Bibliography ==
- Zander (2005). The Police and Criminal Evidence Act (5th ed.). Sweet & Maxwell. ISBN 0-421-90580-8
