= Custodial sentence =

Punishment consisting of mandatory custody of the convict

A custodial sentence is a judicial sentence, imposing a punishment consisting of mandatory custody of the convict, either in prison or in some other closed therapeutic or educational institution, such as a reformatory, (maximum security) psychiatry or drug detoxification (especially cold turkey). As 'custodial' suggests, the sentence requires the suspension of an individual's liberty and the assumption of responsibility over the individual by another body or institution.

The Criminal Justice Act 2003 (England and Wales) states that '(2)The court must not pass a custodial sentence unless it is of the opinion that the offence, or the combination of the offence and one or more offences associated with it, was so serious that neither a fine alone nor a community sentence can be justified for the offence'. Some serious offences incur minimum custodial sentences, unless there are exceptional circumstances. Custodial sentences may also be used where there is a perceived threat to public safety.

Community sentences are non-custodial and include fines, various mandatory but 'open' therapy and courses, restriction orders and loss or suspension of civil rights.

== See also ==
- Capital punishment
- Community sentence
- Suspended sentence
