= Youth rehabilitation order =

Form of non-custodial sentence in the United Kingdom

A youth rehabilitation order is a form of non-custodial sentence that can be given to young offenders in the United Kingdom under powers granted by the Sentencing Act 2020.

The use of youth rehabilitation orders on three young offenders convicted of rape offences in 2026 has been widely criticised by politicians across the political spectrum.
