= Offensive weapon =

Tool designed to cause physical injury

An offensive weapon is a tool made, adapted or intended for inflicting physical injury upon another person.

== Legality ==
=== England and Wales ===
Under England and Wales' Prevention of Crime Act 1953, Section 1(1) states that carrying an offensive weapon on or about a person while in a public place without a lawful authority or reasonable excuse is an offence. Prohibited weapons may include a knuckleduster, baton, hammer, or knife.

Both subsection 4 of this section and the Court of Appeals decision R v Simpson (1983) consider essentially three types of offensive weapon:

1. An offensive weapon per se, i.e., one that is made for causing injury to the person
2. those adapted for such a purpose, e.g., a baseball bat with a nail embedded in it
3. items not made or adapted, but merely intended to be used as an offensive weapon, even if they have some other legitimate use, e.g., car keys held between the knuckles or a cup of bleach which is intended to be thrown in someone's face

An offensive weapon is defined in this section as "any article made or adapted for use for causing injury to the person, or intended by the person having it with him for such use by him or by some other person"

The legislation further defines a "public place" under subsection 4:

"In this section, 'public place' is taken to include any highway and any other premises or place to which at the material time the public have or are permitted to have access, whether on payment or otherwise." This is mirrored through R v Kane (1965). For example, any private property e.g., a person's home or personal vehicle, the area behind the sales counter of a petrol station, a fenced off building site or an office building would be not considered a public place because the public do not have lawful access to such areas. This is because the Prevention of Crime Act 1953 only prohibits offensive weapons in a public place.

A Constable may arrest without warrant any person whom he has reasonable cause to believe to be committing an offence under subsection (1) of section 1, if the Constable is not satisfied as to that person's identity or place of residence, or has reasonable cause to believe that it is necessary to arrest him to prevent the commission by him of any other offence in the course of committing which an offensive weapon might be used.

==== List of offensive weapons ====
Section 141 of the Criminal Justice Act 1988 creates the Either way offence of "any person who manufactures, sells or hires or offers for sale or hire, exposes or has in his possession for the purpose of sale or hire, or lends or gives to any other person, a weapon to which this section applies". These weapons are listed below.

As of May 2019, Part 4 Section 46 the Offensive Weapons Act 2019 added subparagraph 1A to Section 141 of the Criminal Justice Act 1988 which created the summary offence of possession of the following offensive weapons "in private" (as defined below):

The weapons this section relates to are listed under Schedule 1 of the Criminal Justice Act 1988 (Offensive Weapons) Order 1988. Exemptions are provided for weapons over 100 years old from the time of the offence as well as crossbows and anything under the Firearms Act 1968. Section 141(4) creates an offence of importation any weapon to which this section applies. The list as it currently stands is:

- (a) a knuckleduster, that is, a band of metal or other hard material worn on one or more fingers, and designed to cause injury, and any weapon incorporating a knuckleduster;
- (b) a swordstick, that is, a hollow walking-stick or cane containing a blade which may be used as a sword;
- (c) the weapon sometimes known as a "handclaw", being a band of metal or other hard material from which a number of sharp spikes protrude, and worn around the hand;
- (d) the weapon sometimes known as a "belt buckle knife", being a buckle which incorporates or conceals a knife;
- (e) the weapon sometimes known as a "push dagger", being a knife the handle of which fits within a clenched fist and the blade of which protrudes from between two fingers;
- (f) the weapon sometimes known as a "hollow kubotan", being a cylindrical container containing a number of sharp spikes (note: a hollow kubotan is different from a kubotan)
- (g) the weapon sometimes known as a "footclaw", being a bar of metal or other hard material from which a number of sharp spikes protrude, and worn strapped to the foot;
- (h) the weapon sometimes known as a "shuriken", "shaken" or "death star", being a hard non-flexible plate having three or more sharp radiating points and designed to be thrown;
- (i) the weapon sometimes known as a "balisong" or "butterfly knife", being a blade enclosed by its handle, which is designed to split down the middle, without the operation of a spring or other mechanical means, to reveal the blade;
- (j) the weapon sometimes known as a "telescopic truncheon", being a truncheon which extends automatically by hand pressure applied to a button, spring or other device in or attached to its handle;
- (k) the weapon sometimes known as a "blowpipe" or "blow gun", being a hollow tube out of which hard pellets or darts are shot by the use of breath;
- (l) the weapon sometimes known as a "kusari gama", being a length of rope, cord, wire or chain fastened at one end to a sickle;
- (m) the weapon sometimes known as a "kyoketsu shoge", being a length of rope, cord, wire or chain fastened at one end to a hooked knife;
- (n) the weapon sometimes known as a "manrikigusari" or "kusari", being a length of rope, cord, wire or chain fastened at each end to a hard weight or hand grip;
- (o) a disguised knife that is any knife which has a concealed blade or concealed sharp point and is designed to appear to be an everyday object of a kind commonly carried on the person or in a handbag, briefcase, or other hand luggage (such as a comb, brush, writing instrument, cigarette lighter, key, lipstick or telephone)." (concealed knife)
- (p) a stealth knife, that is a knife or spike, which has a blade, or sharp point, made from a material that is not readily detectable by apparatus used for detecting metal and which is not designed for domestic use or for use in the processing, preparation or consumption of food or as a toy;
- (q) a straight, side-handled or friction-lock truncheon (sometimes known as a baton)."
- (r) a sword with a curved blade of 50 centimetres or over in length; and for the purposes of this sub-paragraph, the length of the blade shall be the straight line distance from the top of the handle to the tip of the blade."
- (s) the weapon sometimes known as a "zombie knife", "zombie killer knife" or "zombie slayer knife", being a blade with (i) a cutting edge; (ii) a serrated edge; and (iii) images or words (whether on the blade or handle) that suggest that it is to be used for the purpose of violence."
- (t) the weapon sometimes known as a "cyclone knife" or "spiral knife" being a weapon with (i) a handle, (ii) a blade with two or more cutting edges, each of which forms a helix, and (iii) a sharp point at the end of the blade."

Due to the sweeping implementation of the Offensive Weapons Act 2019, Part 4 Section 46 redefined the previous offence wording of "manufacturing, sells, offers for sale or hire, lending", etc. in relation to the above was replaced with subsection 1(A) which states: "Any person who possesses a weapon to which this section applies in private is guilty of an offence". This takes the ban from a total effective one to an outright one. "Private" is also defined as "...a place other than (a) a public place, (b) school premises, (c) further education premises, or (d) a prison."

N.B. Items covered under the Firearms Act 1968 and crossbows are exempt from being added to this section as per subsection 2.

The most recent amendment to the list of prohibited weapons in the Criminal Justice Act 1988 (Offensive Weapons) Order further introduced a ban on the zombie knife in 2016.

Importing any offensive weapon listed in this section is also an offence under Section 141(4) of this Act.

The same wording and general countrywide prohibition is applied to switchblades, gravity knives, and flick knives under Section 1 of the Restriction of Offensive Weapons Act 1959:

...any knife which has a blade which opens automatically by hand pressure applied to a button, spring or other device in or attached to the handle of the knife, sometimes known as a "flick knife" or "flick gun"; or (b) any knife which has a blade which is released from the handle or sheath thereof by the force of gravity or the application of centrifugal force and which, when released, is locked in place by means of a button, spring, lever, or other device, sometimes known as a "gravity knife".

As of May 2019, the Offensive Weapons Act 2019 further included the definition of all Assisted opening knives which did not meet this definition as not opened through anything in or attached to the handle. Part 4, Paragraph 43, therefore added the following definition to Section 1 Restriction of Offensive Weapons Act 1959:

...any knife which has a blade which opens automatically (i) from the closed position to the fully opened position, or (ii) from a partially opened position to the fully opened position, by manual pressure applied to a button, spring or other device in or attached to the knife, and which is sometimes known as a "flick knife" or "flick gun""

Section 139 of the Criminal Justice Act 1988 also creates an offence of having a pointed or bladed article in a public place without good reason or lawful authority. Certain exemptions exist, namely if the knife is a pocket knife that does not lock in place and if the cutting edge (not blade) is under 3 inches. It is also a recognised defence for a person charged under this section to prove that he had the article with him for use at work, for religious reasons, or as part of any national costume.

==== Reasonable excuse/defences ====
===== Lawful authority/reasonable excuse =====
Despite the carrying of an offensive weapon in a public place being a criminal offence, suspected offenders are given the ability to raise a defence on the civil burden of proof, i.e., on the balance of probabilities. This defence is that the offender, on the balance of probabilities, had lawful authority or reasonable excuse for having the weapon in public.

===== Injury to the person =====
The offence of carrying an offensive weapon in a public place refers to something made, adapted or intended to be used on a person as the offence wording states in Section 1(4) "offensive weapon" means any article made or adapted for use for causing injury to the person, or intended by the person having it with him for such use by him.

This raises two points concerning potential defences: whether an offensive weapon would not be considered as such if intended to be used on a non-human assailant (e.g., a dog), although this has not yet been tested in court. The current sale of various defensive dog sprays to the public would suggest that there would be some scope for this under the law.

The above wording also presents another potential defence of whether or not the item was intended to, or even capable of, causing injury to a person. CPS v Christof [2015] EWHC 4096 (Admin) reiterates "Some items, however, betray the purpose for which they are made by their very design" and "the actual or perhaps deemed intention of the manufacturer is a relevant factor", which implies that the opposite may also be true - a lack of manufacturer's intention or offensive design for the item to be an offensive weapon under the scope of the Prevention of Crime Act 1953 may mean that the item is regarded as not having a criminal purpose.

===== Weapon of opportunity/instantaneous arming =====
An offensive weapon obtained, possessed, or used immediately preceding an imminent attack or during an attack in a public place may be considered a reasonable excuse. This could be either an item made as an offensive weapon, adapted or an every day item that was not intended originally to be carried as an offensive weapon (e.g. golf clubs, walking stick), but during an imminent attack they rightfully became a "weapon of opportunity". The first test of this defence was affirmed by R v Jura [1954] 1 QB 503, 38 Cr. App. R. 53, CCA. This appeal stated that possession of an article for legitimate purposes in public would be later held to be possessing it guiltily if the intent to use the article offensively was formed before imminent violence has arisen.

This was later clarified in Evans v Hughes [1972] QBD, where the justices held that it was not relevant in the case: "for the defence of reasonable excuse to be successful there had to be an imminent particular threat, not the constant carriage of an offensive weapon on account of some enduring threat or danger".

===== Public place =====
While concealed or open carry of any weapon is generally prohibited in England/Wales/Scotland, the Prevention of Crime Act 1953 only prohibited this in a public place. Therefore, the carrying of an offensive weapon at home (i.e. private property) or behind the counter of a shop, fenced off building site, access controlled office block, etc. would be perfectly legal as these are not places the public have a lawful right of access

===== Bladed article defences =====
Section 139(2) of the Criminal Justice Act 1988 defines a bladed/pointed article as "...any article which has a blade or is sharply pointed except a folding pocketknife".

Concerning the offence of having a bladed or pointed article in a public place under Section 139 Criminal Justice Act 1988, as per subsection (4), "good reason" or "lawful authority" would be required.

Subsection (3) waives the "good reason" or "lawful authority" requirement when the item is a folding (non-locking) pocket knife if the cutting edge does not exceed 3 inches, as this knife is not illegal to carry in public. The cutting edge differs from the blade length. Other reasonable excuses are listed explicitly in the defences in subsection (5), which states:

It shall be a defence for a person charged with an offence under this section to prove that he had the article with him:
(a) he had "good reason or lawful authority" for having the bladed or pointed article; or
(b) for use at work;
(c) for religious reasons; or
(d) as part of any national costume

This section also defines a public place in subsection 7 as "any place to which at the material time the public have or are permitted access, whether on payment or otherwise". A defence to this charge could also be that the location where the item was found upon the person was not a public place at the time. Such a place could be a fenced-off building site or a public park outside the opening hours.

This defence would obviously only apply to the bladed article offence. The scope of Section 1 Prevention of Crime Act 1953 would be a separate matter.

For sections 139 and 139A of the Criminal Justice Act 1988, the courts have held:

- a butterknife, with no cutting edge and no point is a bladed article; (Booker v DPP169J.P. 368, DG)
- a screwdriver is not a bladed article; (R v Davis [1998] Crim L.R 564 CA)
- a 'lock knife' does not come into the category of 'folding pocket knife' because it is not immediately foldable at all times; (R v Deegan [1998] 2 Cr. App. R. 121 CA)

===== Relevant case law =====
- Meade & Belt's Case [1823] – 'But the making an attack on a dwelling, and especially at night, the law regards as equivalent to an assault on a man's person; for a man's house is his castle, and therefore, in the eye of the law, it is equivalent to an assault'.
- R v Weston [1879] 14 Cox CC 346 – reasonable force may involve using a weapon against an unarmed opponent if there is an apprehension of death or serious violence
- R v Symondson [1896] 60 JP 645 – the particular degree of danger the householder believed themselves to be in was found relevant
- R v Annie Davis [1905] 69 JP 645 – a woman fired a revolver and wounded her husband. Her defence was that she believed she was firing at a burglar. The court held that if the accused had known it was her husband, she was guilty, but she had a defence if she believed it was a burglar.
- R v Hussey [1924] – "in defence of a man's house, the owner or his family may kill a trespasser who would forcibly dispossess him of it".
- Petrie [1961] 1 WLR 358 – held that an ordinary razor is not an offensive weapon per se. It was held that the prosecution must prove the element of specific intention – each case is fact specific. How the weapon was used might aid in determining the possessor's intention. "The Prevention of Crime Act 1953 lays the burden of proof of either lawful authority or reasonable excuse upon the accused, but only when the possession of an offensive weapon has been established"
- Ball [1967] JPN 723 – a householder fired a shotgun into a crowd that came to attack him. The judge directed the jury to acquit: 'It has been said that an Englishman's home is his castle and if you accept what has been said you could not possibly say that what Ball did was not done in self-defence.'
- Fagan v Metropolitan Police [1969] 1 QB 439, [1968] 3 All ER 442, [1968] 3 WLR 1120, 52 Cr App R 700, DC – stated that to be found guilty of a crime, a person must be shown to have held mens rea as well as actus reus – guilty mind AND commit a guilty act
- Brown [1971] 55 Cr App R 478 – the standard of proof required to establish lawful authority or a reasonable excuse is on a balance of probability and not beyond a reasonable doubt
- Palmer [1971] AC 814–831 – Lord Morris stated: "If there has been an attack so that defence is reasonably necessary it will be recognised that a person defending himself cannot weigh to a nicety the exact measure of his necessary defensive action. If a Jury thought that in a moment of unexpected anguish a person attacked had only done what he honestly and instinctively thought was necessary that would be most potent evidence that only reasonable defensive action had been taken".
- Bates v Bulman [1973] 3 All ER 170 – the Divisional Court held that the accused who grabbed an unopened clasp knife with the immediate intention of using it as an offensive weapon did not commit an offence. This was held to be because of the purpose of the Prevention of Crime Act 1953, which was designed "to cover the situation where an accused person... has with him and is carrying an offensive weapon intending that it shall be used, if necessary, for offensive purposes"
- Allamby [1974] 3 All ER 126 – the charge should specify the time and place that the person charged formed the intention to cause injury. The assumption that the suspect had the necessary intention at some earlier stage is not sufficient
- R v Dayle [1975] 1 WLR 181 – car jack used during an assault but otherwise carried lawfully was not an offence
- Ohlson v Hylton [1975] WLR page 724 – held that a hammer carried home from work, but used during an imminent attack was lawfully used (instantaneous arming). Conviction quashed – appeal upheld.
- R v Humphreys [1977] Crim LR 225 – an ordinary penknife was held not to be an offensive weapon per se when used during an imminent attack because the intent to use it was only formed during the attack
- Southwell v Chadwick [1986] 85 Cr App R 235 – Court of Appeal accepted that a machete in a scabbard and a catapult used for killing squirrels are offensive per se (though not in the facts of this case), the accused had a reasonable excuse (which was to gather food for his wild birds)
- Houghton v Chief Constable of GMP [1986] – an off-duty Constable had a 'reasonable excuse' to the carrying of a truncheon because he was returning from a fancy-dress party
- McCalla [1988] 87 Cr App R 372 – it was held that to have something with one necessarily requires closer contact than mere possession: "every case of 'having' is one of 'possessing', but it does not necessarily follow that every case of 'possessing' is one of 'having' within the meaning of the relevant statutory provisions". This is important, as the offence under S1 Prevention of Crime Act 1953 uses the phrase "has with him".
- McCalla [1988] 87 Cr App R 372 – finding a lost offensive weapon and intending to take it to the nearest police station, but being stopped before able to do so is a reasonable excuse
- Densu [1988] 1 Cr App R 400 – the phrase 'have with him' in terms of S1 PCA1953 is not satisfied if the prosecution proved he had the baton with him but could not prove the accused knew it was a weapon.
- Malnik v DPP [1989] Crim LR 451 per Bingham LJ – ordinarily arming yourself with an offensive weapon to repel unlawful violence when one has deliberately and knowingly brought about the situation in which such violence was liable to be inflicted. Security guards may have more of a reasonable excuse to possess an offensive weapon by the nature of their job.
- Fleming [1989] Crim LR 71 – held that the definition of 'injury to the person' does not include self-harm to the individual possessing it
- KP Warne v DPP [1997] – the prosecution could not show that pickaxe handle (head removed) was sufficiently adapted as an offensive weapon
- Chen v DPP [1997] EWHC Admin 221 (4 March 1997) – held that although an item may technically be an offensive weapon per se, the whole circumstances need to be taken into account. In this case, the High Court ruled that whether an item is an offensive weapon is not a question for the law to decide, but for the jury in this instance. This ruling then went on to state that possession of a kubotan is not illegal per se in a public place when carried as a keyring (note: hollow kubotans are still illegal)
- Daubney [2000] 164 JP 519 – a judge in a lower court erred in his decision to direct the jury to decide that a knife being present in the accused's van was sufficient to prove possession of an offensive weapon
- C v DPP [2001] EWHC Admin 1093 – no evidence presented to hold the opinion that the defendant had formed the intent to use the article (dog chain) offensively before the occasion of the actual use had arisen. Conviction quashed – appeal upheld.
- R Bayliss v DPP [2003] EWHC 245 (admin) – a person who forgets they have an offensive weapon with them in a public place, still has it with them. However, forgetfulness may be relevant to whether the accused had good reason for being in possession of the article.
- Jolie [2004] 1 Cr App R 44 (s139 CJA1988 bladed article charge) – Court of Appeal ruled that proof of whether the accused was aware of the presence of the knife in the vehicle is entirely relevant to the charge as well as whether he was responsible for putting the knife in the place it was found
- DPP v Patterson [2004] EWHC 2744 (admin) – a butterfly knife (offensive per se) used to cut open feed for a horse and bales of hay, was sufficient for reasonable excuse on the facts of the case.
- R v Christof [2005] EWHC 4096 – held that detailed consideration needs to be given as to whether a belt buckle is manufactured as such, or if it is simply a covert knuckleduster
- R v Manjinder Singh Dhindsa [2005] EWCA Crim 1198 – the judge incorrectly ruled that a ring was a knuckleduster under S1 Prevention of Crime Act 1953, that question of whether it was an offensive weapon should have been left to the jury
- R [2007] EWCA Crim 3312 – held that it was for the jury alone to infer from the facts presented, if the article in question (sand gloves) was adapted as an offensive weapon. Conviction quashed – appeal upheld
- N v DPP [2011] 175 JP 337 per Supperstone J at 32 – there is no authority for the proposition that a reasonable excuse can be decided subjectively. "When a defendant claims that he had a reasonable excuse for possession of an offensive weapon because he believed he was at risk of imminent attack, it is for him to prove both the belief and the reasonableness of the belief on a balance of probabilities." (See also Clancy [2012] 176 JP 111 at 18)
- R v Henderson [2016] EWCA Crim 965 – it was ruled that there was no "geographical, temporal or purposive link" to the knife and that it was not "immediately available". Appeal upheld
- Tucker [2016] EWCA Crim 13 – it was held that there is an important distinction between an everyday article introduced to a public place by a person with an intent to injure, and an article already possessed lawfully with good reason that is used offensively to cause injury. All cases depend on its facts

=== New Zealand ===
In New Zealand, the definition is "anything that can be used to cause injury".

=== Australia ===
In South Australia, "offensive weapon" is defined by the Summary Offences Act 1953 as including "a rifle, gun, pistol, knife, sword, club, bludgeon, truncheon or other offensive or lethal weapon or instrument but does not include a prohibited weapon".

== See also ==
- Deadly weapon
- Knife legislation
- Right to keep and bear arms (UK)
- Self-defence in English law

weapons

- Baton (law enforcement)
- Bagh nakh
- Blowgun
- Butterfly knife
- Club (weapon)
- Dagger
- Kama (weapon)
- Karambit
- Kirat
- Kubotan
- Knuckleduster
- Fighting knife
- Flail (weapon)
- Kusarigama
- Guandao
- Mace (bludgeon)
- Machete
- Pike (weapon)
- Push dagger
- Quarterstaff
- Shuriken / Shaken (weapon)
- Sickle
- Shillelagh (club)
- Sjambok
- Slapjack (weapon)
- Spear
- Staff weapon
- Sword-cane
- Stun gun
- Taser
- Tonfa
- War hammer
- War scythe
