= Police (Detention and Bail) Act 2011 =

Public General Act of Parliament of the United Kingdom

- Act of Parliament
- Parliament of the United Kingdom
- Long title: An Act to make provision about the calculation of certain periods of time for the purposes of Part 4 of the Police and Criminal Evidence Act 1984.
- Citation: 2011 c. 9
- Introduced by: Theresa May, Home Secretary (Commons); Baroness Browning, Minister of State for Crime Prevention and Antisocial Behaviour Reduction (Lords)
- Territorial extent: England and Wales

Dates
- Royal assent: 12 July 2011
- Commencement: Amendments deemed to have had effect from 1 January 1986, other provisions on 12 July 2011

Other legislation
- Relates to: Police and Criminal Evidence Act 1984

Status: Current legislation

History of passage through Parliament

Text of statute as originally enacted

Text of the Police (Detention and Bail) Act 2011 as in force today (including any amendments) within the United Kingdom, from legislation.gov.uk.

The Police (Detention and Bail) Act 2011 (c. 9) is an act of the Parliament of the United Kingdom that amends those sections of the Police and Criminal Evidence Act 1984 relating to the detention of criminal suspects by police forces in England and Wales.

== Background ==
The legislation was in response to the decision of McCombe J in R (on the application of the Chief Constable of Greater Manchester Police) v Salford Magistrates' Court and Paul Hookway. Home Secretary Theresa May called the ruling one of "great concern".

== Legislative passage ==
The emergency nature of the act meant it completed its parliamentary passage at a significantly expedited speed, being introduced to the House of Commons on 5 July and completing its stages just two days later, before being passed by the House of Lords and receiving royal assent on 12 July.

== Provisions ==
The act had retrospective effect, a decision supported by Liberty. In debate in the House of Commons, this was supported by all sides, on the grounds that the mistaken interpretation was the one intended by Parliament and relied on by police for the last 25 years; allowing the correct interpretation to stand would jeopardize tens of thousands of ongoing investigations and a vast number of historic convictions.
