= MMA gloves =

Open-fingered gloves optionally used in mixed martial arts bouts

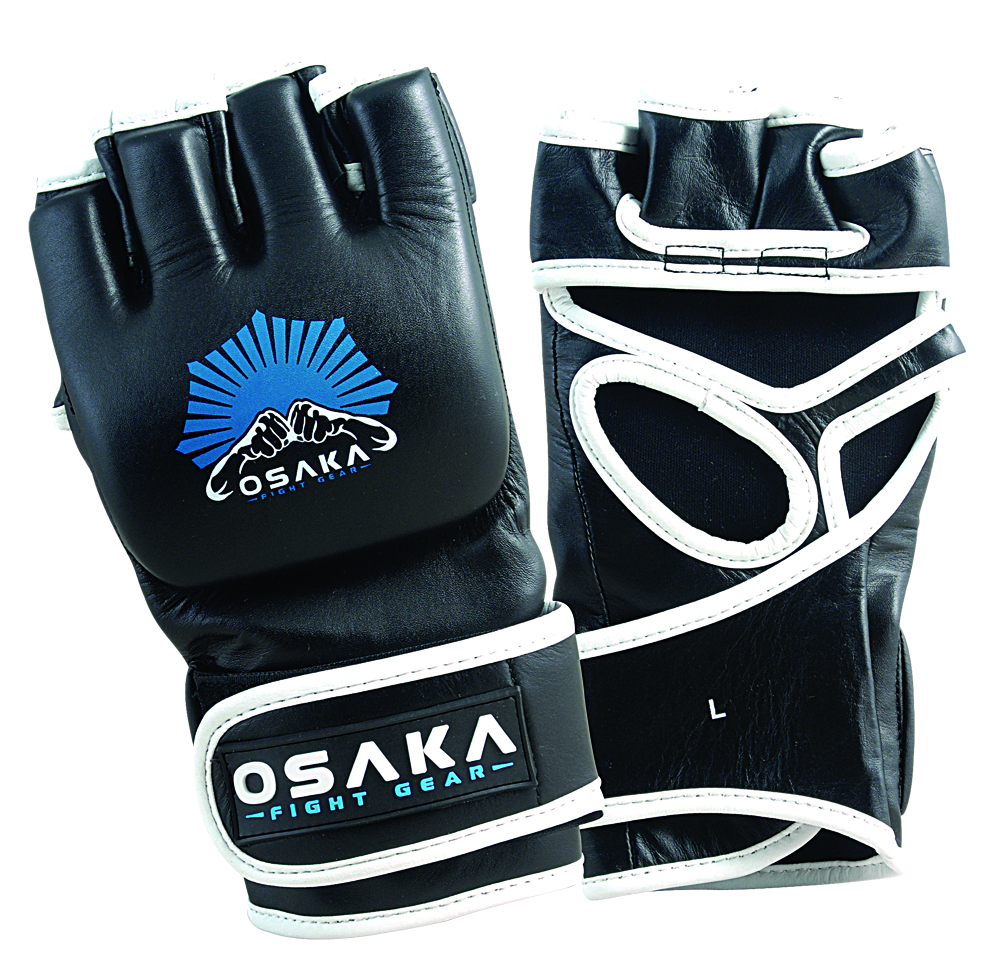
A pair of standard MMA gloves

MMA gloves or grappling gloves are small, open-fingered gloves optionally used in mixed martial arts bouts. They usually have around 4–6 oz (110–170 g) of padding and are designed to provide some protection to the person wearing the glove, but leave the fingers available for grappling maneuvers such as clinch fighting and submissions.

== History ==
Small, open-fingered gloves were first created by professional wrestler Satoru Sayama in 1977, inspired by Bruce Lee's gloves in the 1973 film Enter the Dragon. Sayama was simultaneously training catch wrestling at the New Japan Pro-Wrestling Dojo and kickboxing in the Mejiro Gym, so he intended to create gloves that allowed both striking and grappling. He showed them to his mentor Antonio Inoki, who wore them during his wrestling match with boxer Chuck Wepner on October 25.

The gloves later became mandatory in Sayama's Shooto promotion and were later adopted by the UFC as it developed into a regulated sport. Gloves were introduced to protect fighters' fists from injuries, as well as reduce the number of facial lacerations (and stoppages due to cuts) that fighters experienced without gloves. The introduction of gloves was also intended to encourage fighters to use their hands for striking to allow more captivating matches for fans.

== Types and use ==
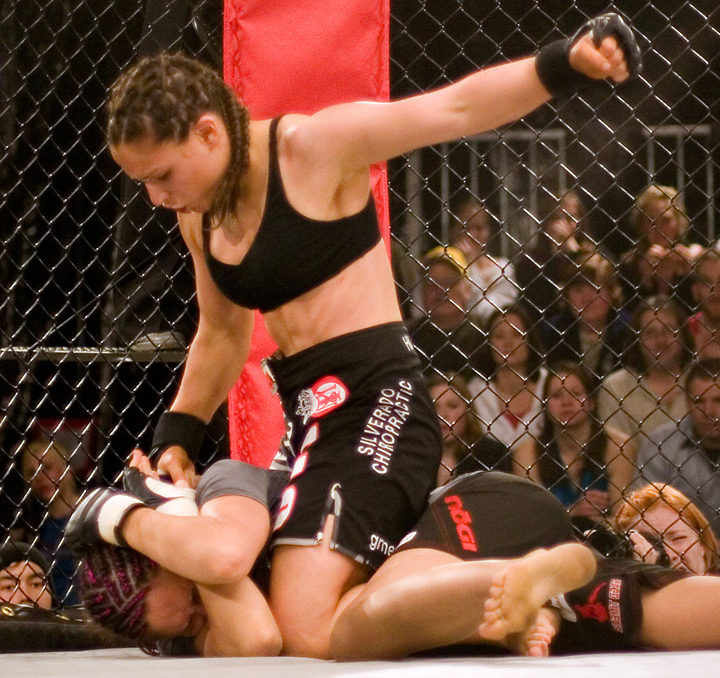
Gina Carano wears MMA gloves during a bout.

- Competition gloves - Most professional fights have the fighters wear 4 ounce (110 g) gloves, whereas amateurs may wear a slightly heavier 6 ounce (170 g) glove for increased protection. According to the rules, UFC allows gloves between 4–6 oz (110–170 g), and even heavier for certain larger sized gloves, e.g. 2 XL – 4 XL.
- Sparring gloves - MMA sparring gloves typically weigh 7 oz (200 g) in terms of padding, making them bulkier than competition gloves. In addition to sparring, the extra padding makes these gloves equally suitable for the heavy bag.
- Grappling gloves - Otherwise known as hybrid or training gloves, these are used mainly for clinch work and grappling. This type of glove has less padding than sparring or competition gloves. In addition, each finger can be moved independently, allowing for more gripping ability.

== Impact of gloves on safety and injuries ==
The impact of gloves on the injuries caused during a fight is a controversial issue, mostly looked at in relation to boxing. The use of padded gloves in fights protects the fists of the wearer but does not prevent brain injury unless they are so large that they become difficult to use. These gloves protect the fists of the wearer and allow stronger punches than in bare-knuckle fights, and it is the changes in acceleration to the head as a whole that tears the blood vessels, not the impact with the glove.

== See also ==
- Cestus
- Boxing glove
- Types of glove
