= Prevention of Crime Act 1953 =

Act of the Parliament of the United Kingdom

Prevention of Crime Act 1953 (Note: Section 2(1).)
- Act of Parliament
- Parliament of the United Kingdom
- Long title: An Act to prohibit the carrying of offensive weapons in public places without lawful authority or reasonable excuse
- Citation: 1 & 2 Eliz. 2 c. 14
- Territorial extent: England and Wales (Note: Section 2(3).)

Dates
- Royal assent: 6 May 1953
- Commencement: 6 June 1953 (Note: Section 2(2).)
Other legislation
Amended by	Criminal Justice Act 1967; Roads (Scotland) Act 1984; Police and Criminal Evidence Act 1984; Public Order Act 1986; Criminal Justice Act 1988; Criminal Procedure (Consequential Provisions) (Scotland) Act 1995; Offensive Weapons Act 1996; Legal Aid, Sentencing and Punishment of Offenders Act 2012; Criminal Justice and Courts Act 2015; Offensive Weapons Act 2019; Sentencing Act 2020; Criminal Justice Act 2003 (Commencement No. 33) and Sentencing Act 2020 (Commencement No. 2) Regulations 2022; Judicial Review and Courts Act 2022 (Magistrates’ Court Sentencing Powers) Regulations 2023

Status: Amended

Text of statute as originally enacted

Text of the Prevention of Crime Act 1953 as in force today (including any amendments) within the United Kingdom, from legislation.gov.uk.

The Prevention of Crime Act 1953 (1 & 2 Eliz. 2 c. 14) is an act of the Parliament of the United Kingdom that restricts the carrying of offensive weapons in public.

The act was passed in response to the large rise in violent crime in the United Kingdom, with 800 cases of armed robbery, assault with intent to rob or robbery with violence and 4,445 cases of malicious wounding in 1951 (the last year up to that point with such statistics) while many of these crimes did not include the use of weapons there were calls from politicians, police officers and members of the public for new laws to combat the problem by restricting civilian weapons.

Prior to the act it was not a crime to carry a weapon in a public place for offensive or defensive purposes (though carrying or using a weapon during the commission of a crime would earn a greater punishment) unless it was a firearm or imitation firearm. The Prevention of Crime Act was created under the presumption that banning weapons from all civilians, regardless of their intention, from public places would reduce violent crime, receiving royal assent on 6 May 1953 and coming into force on 6 June. No subsequent studies were carried out afterwards to ascertain what effect, if any, the act had on crime.

Under the original act, all weapons carried by civilians would be deemed to be offensive weapons (except those persons who were deemed to have a reasonable excuse to have a weapon for self-defence by the courts), persons found in a public place carrying an offensive weapon commits a criminal offence punishable by up to two years in prison. A public place includes highways and anywhere to which the public could regularly have access – such as post offices and train stations. The act makes certain attempts to define an offensive weapon, dividing it into three categories: "articles made for causing injury to the person", such as knuckledusters and batons; "articles adapted for use for causing injury", such as a sock with a brick in it; and "articles intended for use for causing injury to the person", which would include normal, day-to-day items such as scissors. For a conviction under the third category, the prosecution must show evidence that the defendant was intending to use it as an offensive weapon. There is a defence if the defendant had lawful authority (e.g. a licence) or a reasonable excuse (e.g. a bow and arrows being transported for archery practice) for carrying the instrument to be proved on the balance of probabilities.

== Bibliography ==
=== Primary sources ===
- "Prevention of Crime Act 1953 (original text)" (PDF). Office of Public Sector Information. 1953.
- "Prevention of Crime Act 1953". UK Statute Law Database.

=== Secondary sources ===
- Edwards, J. (1953). "Prevention of Crime Act 1953". Modern Law Review. 16 (4). Blackwell Publishing. ISSN 0026-7961.
