= Offensive Weapons Act 2019 =

British criminal law

Offensive Weapons Act 2019 (Note: Section 71.)
- Act of Parliament
- Parliament of the United Kingdom
- Long title: An Act to make provision for and in connection with offences relating to offensive weapons.
- Citation: 2019 c. 17
- Introduced by: Sajid Javid (Commons); Baroness Williams of Trafford (Lords)
- Territorial extent: England and Wales; Scotland; Northern Ireland; (Note: Section 69.)

Dates
- Royal assent: 16 May 2019
- Commencement: Various (Note: Section 70.)
Other legislation
Amends	Prevention of Crime Act 1953; Firearms Act 1968; Restriction of Offensive Weapons Act 1959; Customs and Excise Management Act 1979; Magistrates’ Courts (Northern Ireland) Order 1981; Mental Health Act 1983; Police and Criminal Evidence Act 1984; Prosecution of Offences Act 1985; Criminal Justice Act 1988; Criminal Justice Act 1988 (Offensive Weapons) Order 1988; Police and Criminal Evidence (Northern Ireland) Order 1989; Criminal Procedure (Scotland) Act 1995; Criminal Justice (Northern Ireland) Order 1996; Powers of Criminal Courts (Sentencing) Act 2000Police (Northern Ireland) Act 2003; Criminal Justice Act 2003; Firearms (Northern Ireland) Order 2004; Criminal Justice Act 1988 (Offensive Weapons) (Scotland) Order 2005; Violent Crime Reduction Act 2006; Armed Forces Act 2006; Regulatory Enforcement and Sanctions Act 2008; Criminal Legal Aid (General) Regulations 2013
Amended by	Sentencing (Pre-consolidation Amendments) Act 2020; Sentencing Act 2020; Police, Crime, Sentencing and Courts Act 2022; Criminal Justice Act 2003 (Commencement No. 33) and Sentencing Act 2020 (Commencement No. 2) Regulations 2022; Judicial Review and Courts Act 2022 (Magistrates’ Court Sentencing Powers) Regulations 2023

Status: Amended

History of passage through Parliament

Text of statute as originally enacted

Revised text of statute as amended

The Offensive Weapons Act 2019 (c. 17) is an act of the Parliament of the United Kingdom. The act addresses crimes related to acid attacks (including the sale and possession in public places of corrosive substances); knife crime prevention orders; the sale of, delivery and possession of knives and other offensive weapons; and introduced further restrictions on firearms. It was introduced to Parliament as a government bill by Sajid Javid and Baroness Williams of Trafford of the Home Office.

== Legislative passage ==
Restrictions on 0.50 calibre rifles were removed after pressure from members of the European Research Group and the Democratic Unionist Party.

== Provisions ==
The provisions of the act include:

=== Part 1 ===
- Making it an offence to sell a corrosive product to any person under the age of 18.
  - A person found guilty of this offence, on summary conviction and in England and Wales, is liable to a prison term of no more than 51 weeks, a fine or both. In Scotland or Northern Ireland, the prison term is not to be more than 6 months.
- Regulating the despatch and delivery of corrosive products.
- Making it an offence for a person to have a corrosive substance in a public place unless they can prove they had a good reason or lawful authority to do so (Section 6).
  - In this context "corrosive substance" means a substance which is capable of burning human skin by corrosion.
- Making provisions for custodial sentences after a person is convicted of an offence under section 6.
- Amending the Police and Criminal Evidence Act 1984 to include reference to Section 6 and allow for police searches for corrosive substances if an offence under Section 6 has been committed, is being committed or is likely to be committed.
- Allows constables in Scotland to detain and search a person without a warrant if there is reasonable grounds for suspecting that the person is carrying a corrosive substance or has committed or is committing an offence under Section 6.
- This section also allows constables to seize any substances found during a search if it can be reasonably suspected that the substance is corrosive.
- When detaining a person using powers from this section, the constable must inform the person that they are doing so.
- It also makes it an offence to intentionally obstruct a constable acting in the exercise of their powers under the section or to conceal a corrosive substance from a constable when being searched under the powers given in this section.
- Amending the Police and Criminal Evidence (Northern Ireland) Order 1989 in a similar way to the amendment of the Police and Criminal Evidence Act 1984, as detailed above.

=== Part 2 ===
- Allowing courts to make a knife crime prevention order without passing conviction.
- Establishing requirements for the applications of such orders.
- Allowing courts to make a knife crime prevention order with convictions.
- Establishing the provisions and requirements of knife crime prevention orders.

=== Part 3 ===
- Establishing defences and their limitations to persons charged with selling a bladed article to a person under the age of 18.
- Regulating the despatch and delivery of bladed products.
- Defining that a "bladed product" in the Act means an article which:
  - (a) is or has a blade, and
  - (b) is capable of causing a serious injury to a person which involves cutting that person's skin.

=== Part 4 ===
- Amending the definition of "flick knife" from the Restriction of Offensive Weapons Act 1959 to be:
  - Any knife which has a blade which opens automatically—
    - (i) from the closed position to the fully opened position, or
    - (ii) from a partially opened position to the fully opened position,
  - by manual pressure applied to a button, spring or other device in or attached to the knife
- Amending the Restriction of Offensive Weapons Act 1959 in respect to the possession of dangerous knives.
- Increasing the restrictions of the Criminal Justice Act 1988 in respect to the possession of offensive weapons on school premises to cover further education premises.
- Increasing the powers of the Home Secretary, the Scottish Ministers and the Department of Justice in Northern Ireland in regards to the arranging of the "orderly surrender" of offensive weapons at police stations.
- The establishment of payments to persons surrendering weapons which would become illegal due to the amendment of the Restriction of Offensive Weapons Act 1959.

=== Part 5 ===
- Amending the Prevention of Crime Act 1953 in regards to the threatening with an offensive weapon in a public place.
- Amending the Criminal Justice Act 1988 in regards to the threatening with an offensive weapon on education premises.
- Making it an offence to, while in a private place, unlawfully and intentionally threaten another with an article or substance in a way that there would be an immediate risk of serious harm to the other person.
  - In this context, "an article or substance" is defined as:
    - (a) an offensive weapon as described in section 1 of the Prevention of Crime Act 1953
    - (b) an article to which section 139 of the Criminal Justice Act 1988 applies, or
    - (c) a corrosive substance.
  - A person found guilty of this offence is liable, on summary conviction, to a prison term not exceeding 12 months, a fine or both. If found guilty on conviction on indictment, a person is liable to a prison term of up to 4 years, a fine or both.
- Making provisions to allow constables to, if they have reasonable grounds for suspicion, search school and further education premises and persons on them for corrosive substances and allowing them to seize any suspected corrosive substances.

=== Part 6 ===
- Amending the Firearms Act 1968 and the Firearms (Northern Ireland) Order 2004 to prohibit firearms that use the propellant gas to extract the spent casing (except rifles in .22 rimfire) and bump stocks.
- Making provisions for the surrender of and compensation for the above items that were now illegal.

=== Part 7 ===
- Allowing local weights and measures authorities to enforce laws relating to the sale of offensive weapons.

== Timetable ==
=== House of Commons ===
The bill had its first reading in the House of Commons on 20 June 2018 and its second reading a week later, on 27 June. The bill's committee stage began in July 2018 when it was debated by a public bill committee chaired by Mike Gapes. The committee reported to Parliament on 28 November 2018, with the bill having its third reading the same day.

=== House of Lords ===
The bill had its first reading in the House of Lords on 29 November 2018 and its second reading on 7 January 2019. The Lords Committee first debated the bill on 28 January and made its report in February 2019. The bill passed its third reading on 19 March 2019 and the amendments were passed back to the Commons.

=== Amendments and royal assent ===
MPs amended the Lords' proposals on 26 March and passed the Bill back to the Lords where it was debated on 10 April. The previous Lords amendments which the Commons had refused were not insisted on and the other Commons amendments were accepted. Royal assent was achieved by May 2019.

== See also ==
- Criminal Justice Act 1988
- Offensive weapon
