= Community sentence =

Punishment of convicts other than a custodial sentence

Community sentence or alternative sentencing or non-custodial sentence is a collective name in criminal justice for all the different ways in which courts can punish a defendant who has been convicted of committing an offense, other than through a custodial sentence (serving a jail or prison term) or capital punishment (death).

Traditionally, the theory of retributive justice is based on the ideas of retaliation (punishment), which is valuable in itself, and also provides deterrent. Before the police, sentences of execution or imprisonment were thought pretty efficient at this, while at the same time removing the threat criminals pose to the public (protection). Alternative sentences add to these goals, trying to reform the offender (rehabilitation), and put right what they did (reparation).

Traditionally, victims of a crime only played a small part in the criminal justice process, as this breached the rules of society. The restorative approach to justice often includes a requirement for the offender to apologize, compensate for the damages they have caused, or repair such damages with their labor as part of their sentence.

The shift towards alternative sentencing means that some offenders avoid imprisonment with its many unwanted consequences. This is beneficial for society, as it may prevent them from getting into the so-called revolving door syndrome, the inability of a person to go back to normal life after leaving prison, becoming a career criminal. Furthermore, there is hope that this could alleviate prison overcrowding and reduce the cost of punishment.

Instead of depriving those who commit less dangerous offenses (such as summary offenses) of their freedom, the courts put some limitations on them and give them some duties. The list of components that make up a community sentence is of course different in individual countries, and will be combined individually by the court. Non-custodial sentences can include:

- unpaid work (this can be called community payback or community service)
- house arrest
- curfew
- suspended sentence (that means that breaking the law during a sentence may lead to imprisonment)
- wearing an electronic tag
- mandatory treatments and programs (drug or alcohol treatment, psychological help, back-to-work programs)
- apology to the victim
- specific court orders and injunctions (not to drink alcohol, not to go to certain pubs, meet certain people)
- regular reporting to someone (offender manager, probation)
- judicial corporal punishment

== See also ==
- Parole
- Probation
- Youth rehabilitation order
