= Brass knuckles =

Weapon used in hand-to-hand combat

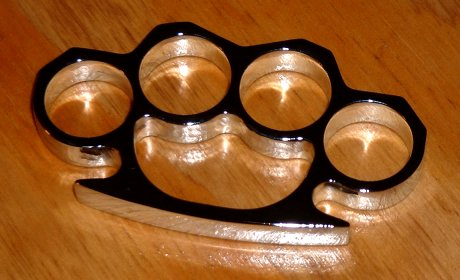
Brass knuckles

Brass knuckles (also referred to as brass knucks, knuckledusters, iron fists and paperweights, among other names) are melee weapons used primarily in hand-to-hand combat. They are fitted and designed to be worn around the knuckles of the human hand. Despite their name, they are often made from steel, wood, aluminium, plastics or carbon fibers and not necessarily brass.

Designed to preserve and concentrate a punch's force by directing it toward a harder and smaller contact area, they result in increased tissue disruption, including an increased likelihood of fracturing the intended target's bones on impact. The extended and rounded palm grip also spreads the counter-force across the attacker's palm, which would otherwise have been absorbed primarily by the attacker's fingers. This reduces the likelihood of damage to the attacker's fingers.

The weapon is controversial for its easy concealability and its association with organized crime; as a result it is illegal to own and use in a number of countries and provinces.

== History and variations ==
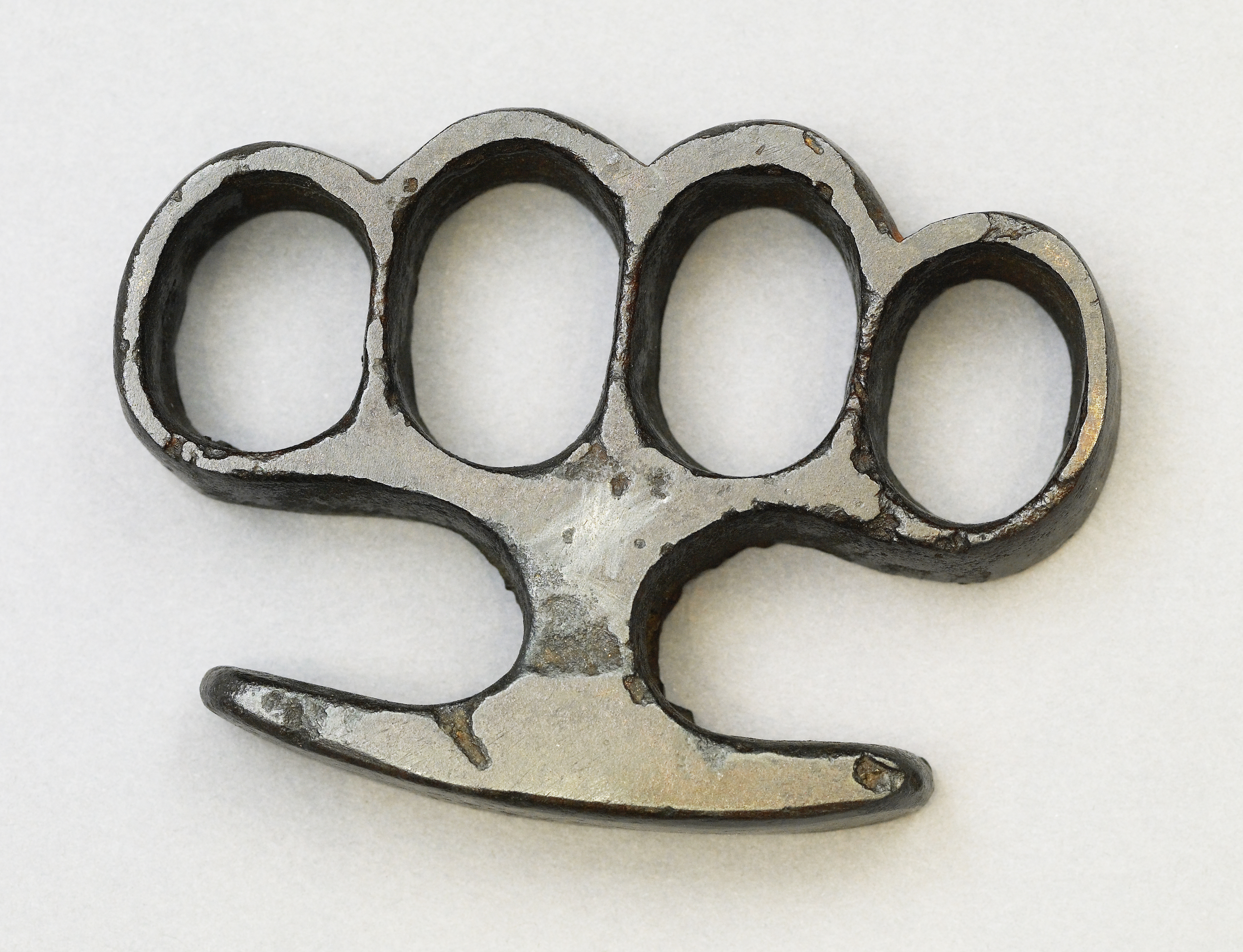
Brass knuckles carried by Abraham Lincoln's bodyguards during his train ride through Baltimore. Ford's Theatre National Historic Site, 2007

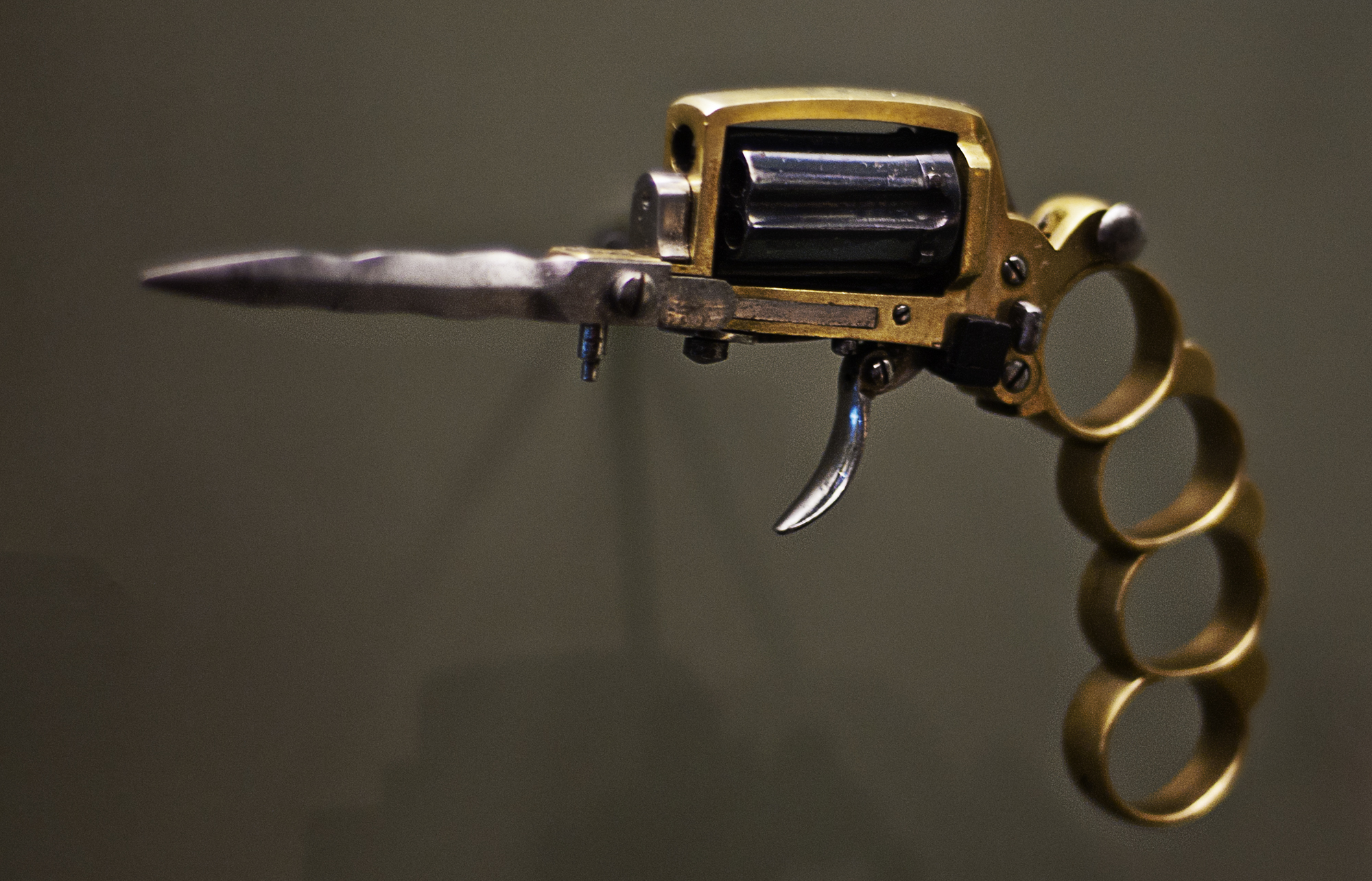
An Apache revolver, a weapon that combines brass knuckles with a firearm and a dagger – Curtius Museum, Liège, 2011

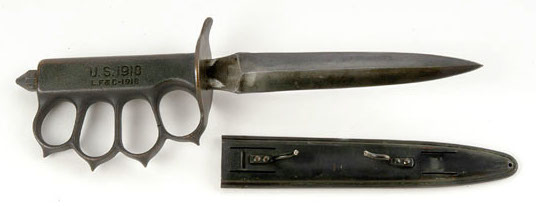
Mark I brass knuckles trench knife

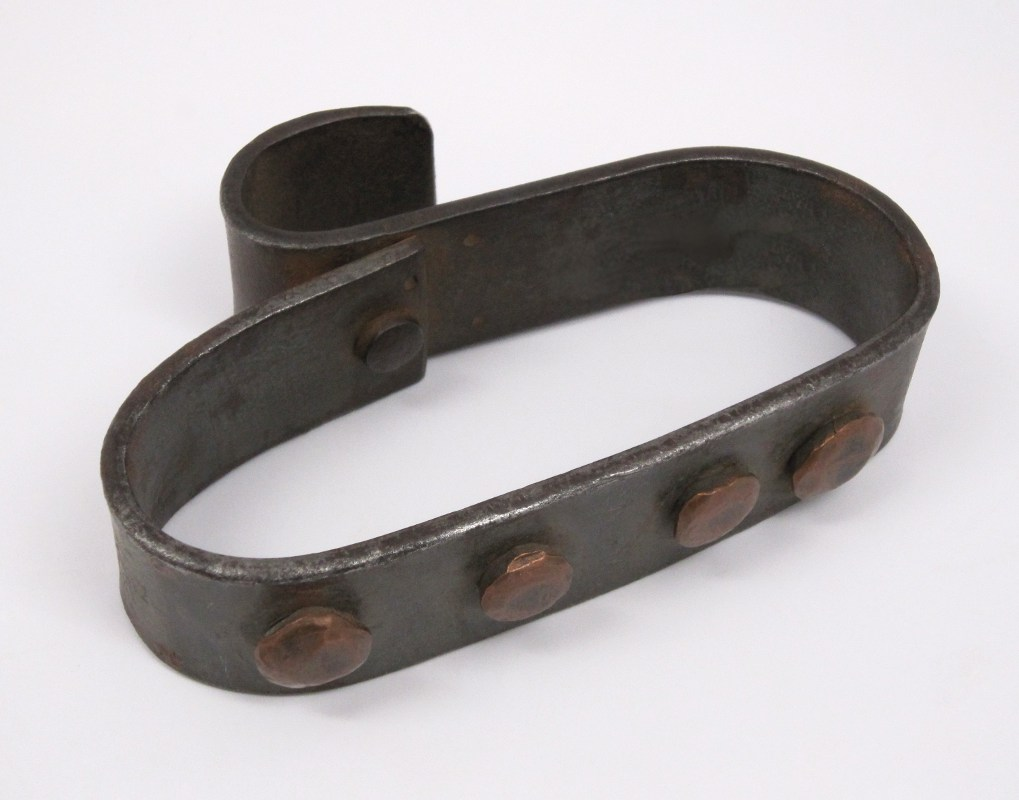
Homemade brass knuckles used in a lumber camp in Pine County, Minnesota. c. 1890

Similar weapons like the Cestus or Vajra-mushti have been used since ancient times. Some brass knuckles have rounded rings, which increase the impact of blows from moderate to severe damage. Other instruments (not generally considered to be "brass knuckles" or "metal knuckles" per se) may have spikes, sharp points and cutting edges. These devices come in many variations and are called by a variety of names, including "knuckle knives."

During the American Civil War (1861–1865) knuckles made of cast iron, brass, lead, and wood became popular. Soldiers would often buy cast iron or brass knuckles. If they could not buy them, they would carve their own from wood, or cast them at camp by melting lead bullets and using a mold in the dirt.

By the late 19th century, knuckledusters were incorporated into various kinds of pistols such as the Apache revolver used by criminals in France in the late 19th to early 20th centuries. During World War I the US Army issued two different knuckle knives, the US model 1917 and US model 1918 Mark I trench knives. Knuckles and knuckle knives were also being made in England at the time and purchased privately by British soldiers. It was advised not to polish brass knuckles as allowing the brass to darken would act as camouflage on the battlefield.

By World War II, knuckles and knuckle knives were quite popular with both American and British soldiers. The Model 1918 trench knives were reissued to American paratroopers. A notable knuckle knife still in use is the Cuchillo de Paracaidista, issued to Argentinian paratroopers. Current-issue models have an emergency blade in the cross guard.

== Legality and distribution ==
Legality of brass knuckles: Green: Possession only legal Teal: Possession legal in many local subdivisions Blue: Possession and bearing legal Red: Illegal

Brass knuckles are illegal in several regions, including: Italy, Hong Kong, Austria, Belgium, Bosnia and Herzegovina, Canada, Denmark, Croatia, Cyprus, Estonia, Finland, France, Germany, Greece, Hungary, Iran, Israel, Ireland, Malaysia, the Netherlands, Norway, Poland, Portugal, Russia, Spain, Turkey, Sweden, Singapore, Taiwan, Ukraine, the United Arab Emirates and the United Kingdom.

Import of brass knuckles into Australia is illegal unless a government permit is obtained; permits are available for only limited purposes, such as police and government use, or use in film productions. They are prohibited weapons in the state of New South Wales.

In Brazil, brass knuckles are legal and freely sold. They are called soco inglês, which means 'English punch', or soqueira, which means 'puncher'.

In Canada, brass knuckles (Canadian French poing américain, which literally means 'American fist'), or any similar devices made of metal, are listed as prohibited weapons; possession of such weapon is a criminal offence under the Criminal Code. Plastic knuckles have been determined to be legal in Canada.

In France, brass knuckles are illegal. They can be bought as a "collectable" (provided one is over 18), but it is forbidden to carry or use one, whatever the circumstance, including self-defense. The French term is coup-de-poing américain, which literally means 'American punch'.

In Russia, brass knuckles were illegal to purchase or own during Imperial times and are still forbidden according to Article 6 of the 1996 Federal Law on Weapons. They are called кастет (from French casse-tête, literally 'head breaker').

In Serbia, brass knuckles are legal to purchase and own (for people over 16 years old) but are not legal to carry in public. They are called боксер, literally 'boxer'.

In Taiwan, according to the law of the Republic of China, possession and sales of brass knuckles are illegal. Under the regulation, brass knuckles are considered weapons. Without the permission of the central regulatory agency, it is against the law to manufacture, sell, transport, transfer, rent, or have them in any collection or on display.

In China, brass knuckles are legal as per the law of the People's Republic of China. According to Article 32 of the "Public Security Administration Punishment Law of the People's Republic of China", citizens can legally own them for self-defense, but they are prohibited items in certain places. For example, brass knuckles are not allowed to be carried when travelling on metro systems, buses, trains or other public transport. In ancient China, brass knuckles were popular, and were used regularly as a concealed weapon or self-defense tool.

In the United States, brass knuckles are not prohibited at the federal level, but various state, county and city laws, and the District of Columbia, regulate or prohibit their purchase and/or possession. As of 2025, brass knuckles are prohibited in 20 states. Some state laws require purchasers to be 18 or older. Most states have statutes regulating the carrying of weapons, and some specifically prohibit brass knuckles or "metal knuckles". Some companies manufacture belt buckles or novelty paper weights that function as brass knuckles. Brass knuckles made of plastic, rather than metal, have been marketed as "undetectable by airport metal detectors". Some states that ban metal knuckles also ban plastic knuckles. For example, New York's criminal statutes list both "metal knuckles" and "plastic knuckles" as prohibited weapons, but do not define either.

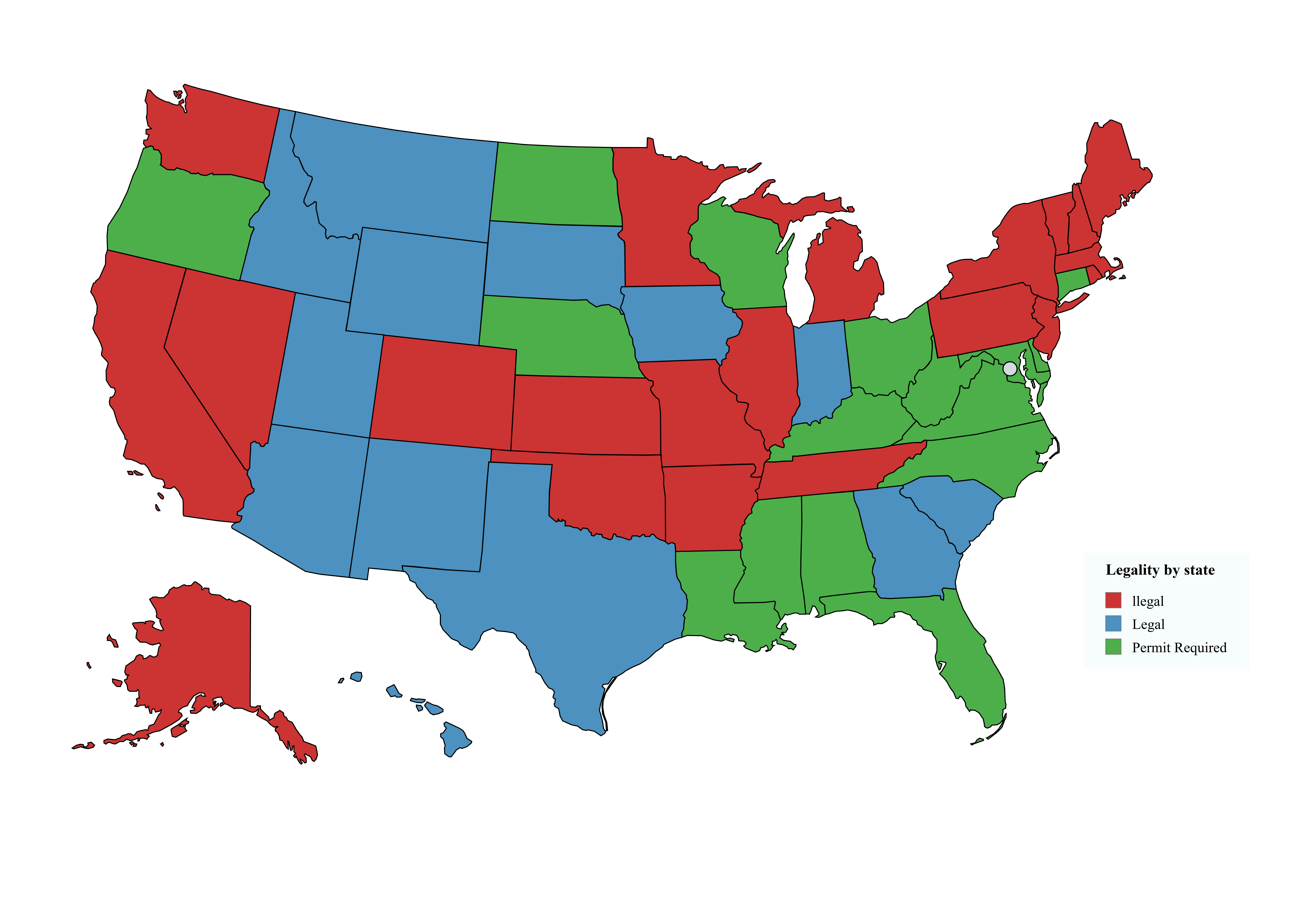
Brass knuckles legality in the United States: Red: Illegal, Blue: legal, Green: legal with permit.

== See also ==
- Bagh nakh
- Cestus (boxing)
- Gauntlet (glove)
- Mark I trench knife
- Tekkō
- Vajra-mushti
- Weighted-knuckle glove
