= Cestus (boxing) =

Ancient fighting glove

Gallo-Roman mosaic (ca. 175 AD) showing a boxing scene from Virgil's Aeneid, book 5: cesti are worn by the aging Sicilian victor Entellus, who sacrifices his prize bull by landing a great blow to its head, and by the young Trojan Dares, his head spurting blood

A cestus or caestus (Classical Latin: [ˈkae̯stʊs], Ancient Greek: κεστός) is a fighting glove that was sometimes used in Roman gladiatorial events. It was based on a Greek original, which employed straps called himantes and sphirae, hard leather strips that enclosed and protected the fist and lower arm. Some cesti were fitted with studs or spikes to inflict potentially lethal injuries. Cestus fighters seem to have had no form of body armour, apart from the cestus itself. Contemporary depictions show the cestus worn in pairs.

== Terminology ==
Latin Caestus or cestus translates as "striker". Its plural is caestus. More rarely, plural cesti is used; this translates as "thongs". English language plural "cestuses" is also used.

== Greece and Rome ==
In Greece, cestus-fights were featured in the Olympic games. Theagenes of Thasos, cestus champion in the Olympics of 480 BC, is said to have killed "most of his opponents"; he was also victor of the Olympic pankration and many other athletic events, and was given hero cult after his death. At some time in the development of Rome's gladiator games, cestus fighting was introduced as an arena spectacle.

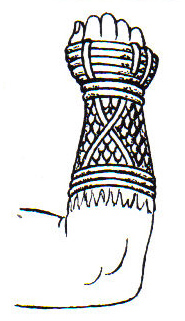
Drawing of a cestus

The basic Roman cestus was made of hard leather straps, which enclosed and protected the fighter's lower arm and fist. The straps could be studded, or, more extremely, spiked. Caestūs were usually worn in pairs. In Roman gladiator contests, cestus-fighters were probably matched against others of their kind; the cestus was effective protection and weaponry against other cestus fighters, and possibly against armoured gladiators equipped with other weapons. Apart from the cestus itself, the cestus-fighter would probably have had no body armour.

Like all arena personnel (arenarii), cestus fighters were either slaves or infames, "infamous ones" who held a very low level of citizenship, their status and privileges severely restricted because of their professional association with blood-pollution and death.

== See also ==
- Boxer at Rest – Hellenistic Greek bronze sculpture
- Boxing glove
- Brass knuckles
- Cestvs: The Roman Fighter – Japanese manga series
- Gauntlet (glove)
- MMA gloves
- Weighted-knuckle glove
