= Cestus =

Ancient band, girdle or tie

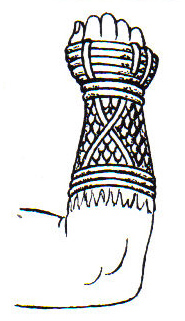
Drawing of a cestus

Cestus (Ancient Greek: κεστός, romanized: kestos), plural: cesti (Ancient Greek: κεστοί, romanized: kestoi), in a general sense meant, for ancient Greeks and Romans, any band or tie.

However, it was more frequently used to refer to:

- The Girdle of Aphrodite.
- Boxing gloves used by ancient Greeks and Romans, also written Caestus.
- A girdle or belt worn by women in ancient Greece.
- A marriage girdle, given by a newly married wife to her husband.

Because the Cestus of Aphrodite was believed to have powers of attraction and seduction, the term cestus came to refer more broadly to any striking or showy garments worn by women.

In poetry (especially epigrams), the word was used figuratively. For example, one poem says someone "sounded more magical than the kestos", meaning more enchanting or seductive. Another poem describes dewy lips and a sweet youthful harmony as the kestos of the Paphian Aphrodite.

According to tradition, Paris was said to have composed or recited a hymn to Aphrodite called the Kestos.

One of the works of Sextus Julius Africanus is Kestoi ("Charmed Girdles"), a work in 24 books. It is a kind of practical or physical treatise that collects magical spells, including incantations, charms, written symbols, and various ritual practices or procedures.
