= Zombie knife =

Ornate weapon inspired by zombie media

Illustration of a zombie knife

A zombie knife (also known as a zombie killer knife or zombie slayer knife) is a type of ornate knife or bladed weapon inspired by zombie films and TV series. These knives can range in size and shape, but are legally defined in the UK as having a cutting edge, a serrated edge and images or words (whether on the blade or handle) that suggest that it is to be used for the purpose of violence. Despite being designed for collectors and survivalists, the appearance of zombie knives led to their increasing usage in criminality. In 2016, parts of the United Kingdom made the sale of such knives illegal but with exceptions. In September 2024, the UK Government made the selling of zombie knives illegal without exceptions.

== History ==
American knife company KA-BAR released a series of Zombie-Themed knives in 2011, with a company official joking about "the need for knives capable of killing a zombie when firearms aren't available". The original set of six knives named: Kharon, Acheron, Famine, War, Pestilence and Death featured distinct neon-green handles and a bio-hazard symbol. Commenting on the company's Zombie Knife line, CEO John Stitt stated that, when exhibited at trade show SHOT 2011, "everybody laughed at us"; however, "the next year everything was green, everything was zombies!" Soon other manufacturers such as Gerber joined the craze by releasing their own zombie apocalypse inspired products.

=== Prohibition in the United Kingdom ===
In 2015, after years of falling numbers, knife crime in London increased by 18% while the number of people murdered yearly increased by 26%. Responding to the figures, the Metropolitan Police outlined the sale of zombie knives on the dark web as a contributing factor.

In 2016, an amendment to the Criminal Justice Act 1988 (Offensive Weapons) Order 1988 added the following to the list of weapons whose importation, manufacture, sale or hire is banned:

the weapon sometimes known as a "zombie knife", "zombie killer knife" or "zombie slayer knife", being a blade with—

1. a cutting edge;
2. a serrated edge; and
3. images or words (whether on the blade or handle) that suggest that it is to be used for the purpose of violence.

The ban took effect from 18 August 2016. The Offensive Weapons Act 2019 further prohibited possession of weapons listed in the order, including zombie knives, even in private. Possession is a summary offence with a penalty of up to six months' imprisonment. In Northern Ireland it is an either way offence with a maximum sentence of four years' imprisonment, or 12 months if tried summarily.

In 2024, the Offensive Weapons Act was further amended, prohibiting the possession of weapons which did not have images or words depicting violence on the blade or handle, effectively closing a legal loophole. An amnesty and compensation scheme was introduced to encourage the collection of the prohibited weapons.

The Criminal Justice Act 1988 (Offensive Weapons) (Amendment, Surrender and Compensation) (Scotland) Order 2022 makes similar provision to the 2016 order in Scotland, and also established a three month period in which the knives could be surrendered to the police in exchange for compensation. The ban on possession was then brought into force in Scotland in March 2023.
