= Sheath knife =

Fixed-bladed knife

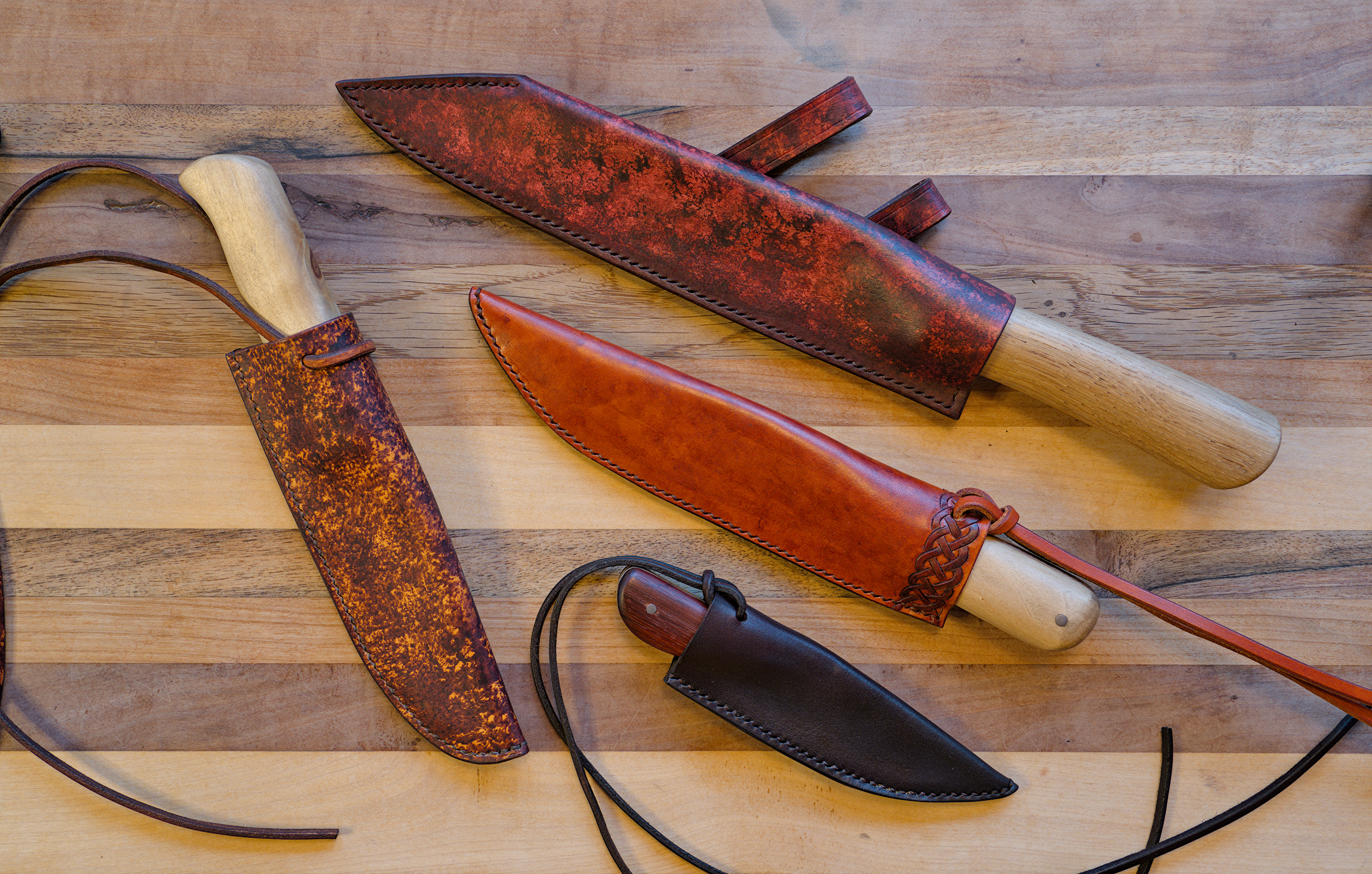
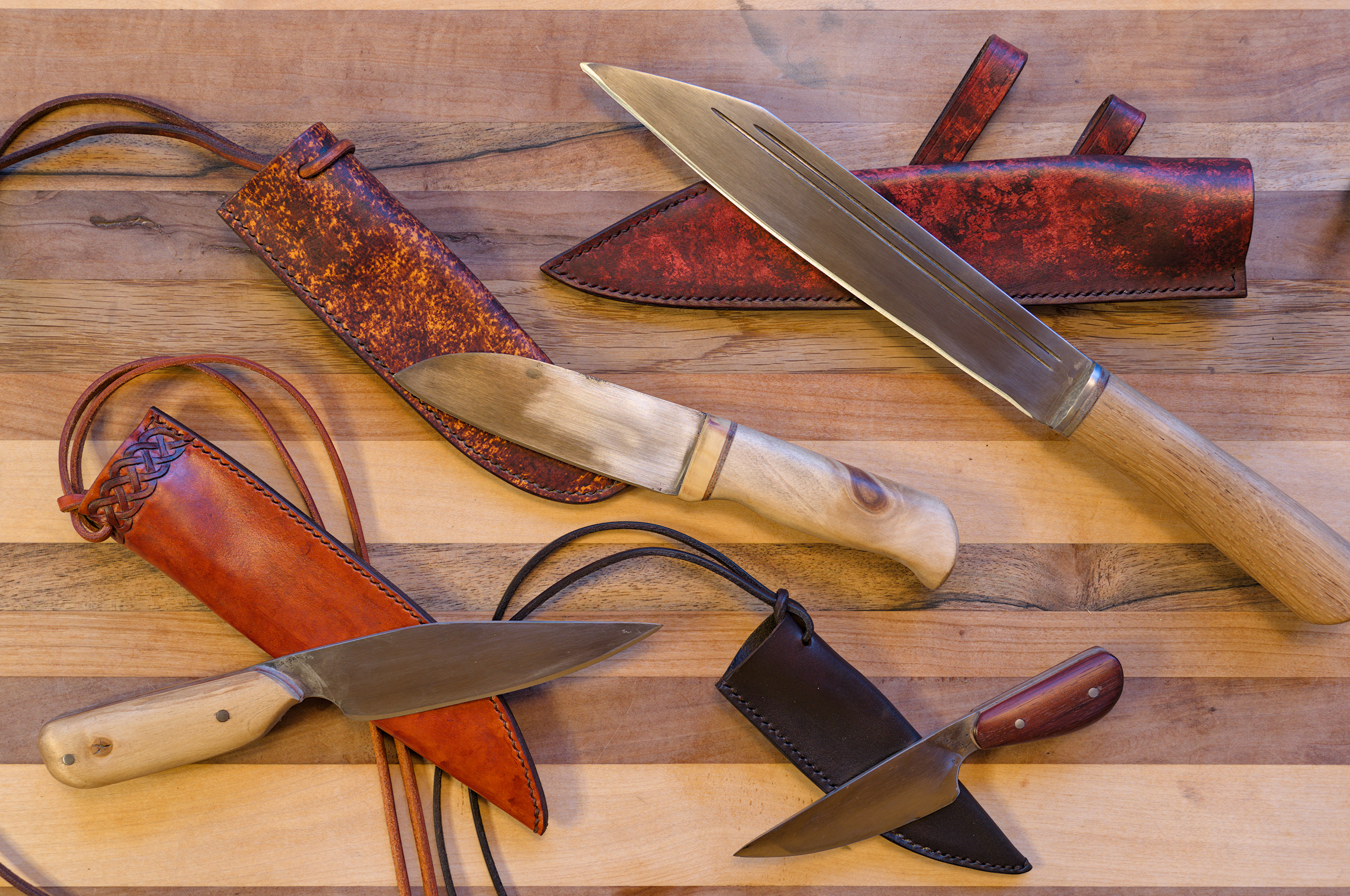
Sheath knives

A sheath knife is a fixed-bladed knife that fits into a sheath, by tradition usually of leather, now often of other material such as nylon or kevlar. The sheath is used to protect the knife and act as a carrier. Most importantly, the sheath protects the person carrying the knife (e.g. in the pocket or hanging on the belt) from potentially serious injuries that the sharp blade could easily cause if unprotected. To provide sufficient protection, sheaths made of soft materials, such as leather, often have reinforcements, inside or outside, made of metal sheet or other suitable strong materials.

The blades vary in size, shape, and construction.

In Australian law, "sheath knife" has a different definition. In this case, it is a type of non-folding, fixed-blade knife which has "a sheath which withdraws into its handle", thus giving something of the effect of an "out-the-front" flick knife. These knives, like flick knives, are classed as "prohibited weapons" in Australia.

== See also ==
- Pocket knife
- Sliding knife
