= Knife legislation =

Legal aspects of selling, owning, carrying, and using certain types of knives

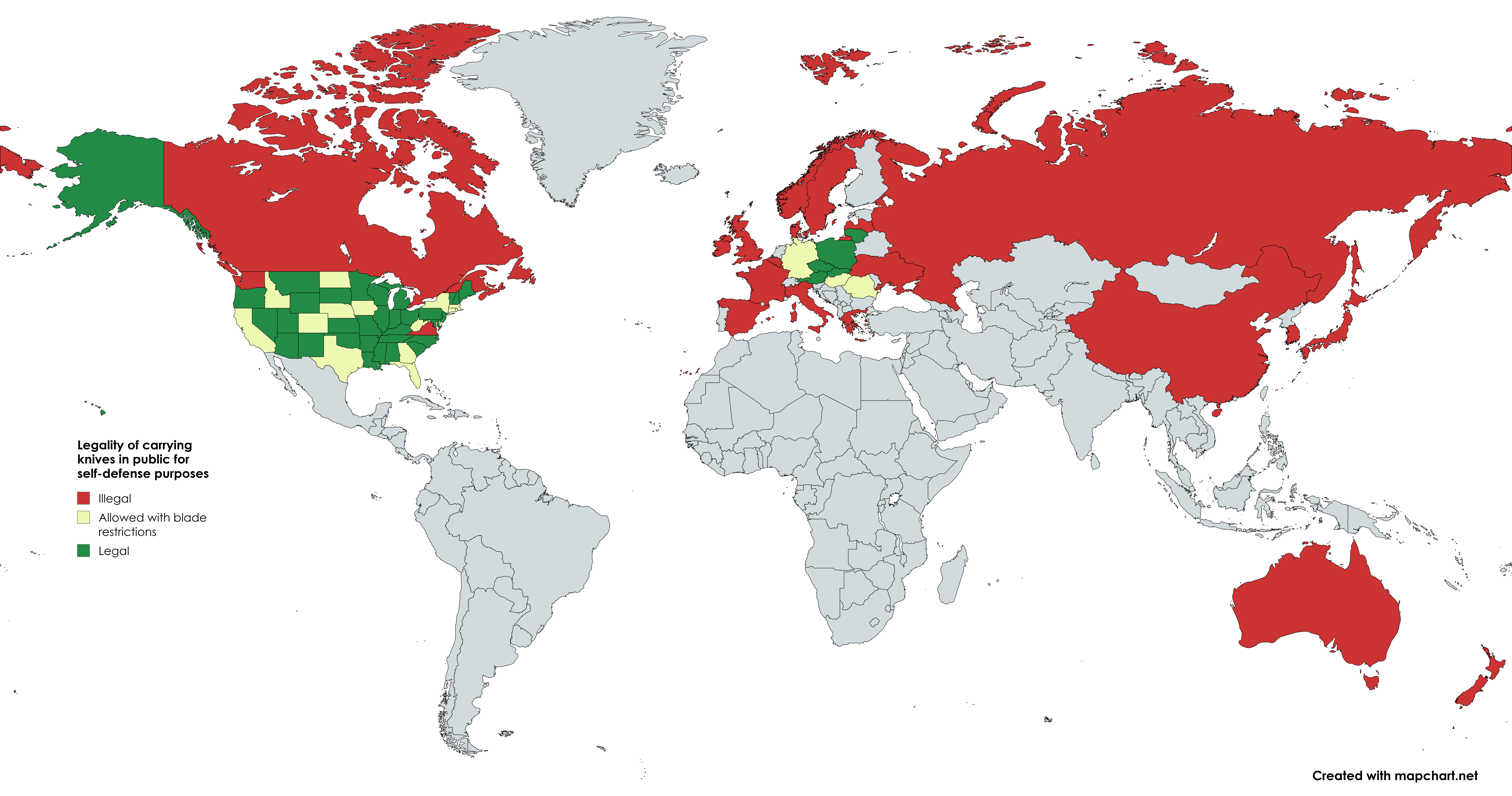
Laws on carrying knives in public for self-defense by country

Knife legislation is defined as the body of statutory law or case law promulgated or enacted by a government or other governing jurisdiction that prohibits, criminalizes, or restricts the otherwise legal manufacture, importation, sale, transfer, possession, transport, or use of knives.

Carrying knives in public is forbidden or restricted by law in many countries. Exceptions may be made for hunting knives, pocket knives, and knives used for work-related purposes (chef's knives, etc.), depending upon the laws of a given jurisdiction. In turn, the carrying or possessing of certain types of knives perceived as deadly or offensive weapons, such as switchblade knives and butterfly knives, may be restricted or prohibited. Even where knives may be legally carried on the person generally, this right may not extend to all places and circumstances, and knives of any description may be prohibited at schools, public buildings, courthouses, and public events.

== Austria ==
Under the Austrian Arms Act of 1996 (Waffengesetz 1996), it is illegal to buy, import, possess, or carry weapons that are disguised as another object or as an object of common use (sword canes, e.g., or knives disguised as ink pens, brush handles, or belt buckles). For ordinary knives, however, there are no restrictions or prohibitions based on blade length or opening or locking mechanism.

The Arms Act defines weapons as "objects that by their very nature are intended to reduce or eliminate the defensive ability of a person through direct impact", specifically including all firearms. Consequently, certain knives are considered "weapons" under this definition. Except for firearms, however, which are heavily regulated, such "weapons", including automatic opening lock-blade knives (switchblades), OTF automatic knives, butterfly knives, and gravity knives are implicitly permitted under the Arms Act, and thus may be bought, possessed and carried by anyone over the age of 18 who has not been expressly banned from owning any weapon (Waffenverbot) by the civilian authorities.

== Belgium ==
Article 3, §1 of the 2006 Weapons Act lists the switchblade or automatic knife (couteaux à cran d'arrêt et à lame jaillissante), as well as butterfly knives, throwing knives, throwing stars, and knives or blades that have the appearance of other objects (i.e. sword canes, belt buckle knives, etc.) as prohibited weapons. In addition to specifically prohibited knives, the police and local jurisdictions have broad authority to prohibit the carrying or possession of a wide variety of knives, to include carriage inside a vehicle, if the owner cannot establish sufficient legal reason (motif légitime) for doing so, particularly in urban areas or at public events. This discretion extends to even folding knives without a locking blade.

== Bulgaria ==
Bulgarian weapon law is maintained annually. It is called ZOBVVPI (Bulgarian: ЗОБВВПИ; Закон за оръжията, боеприпасите, взривните вещества и пиротехническите изделия) and it covers ONLY the possession and usage of firearms (including gas and signal ones), and pellet or BB (Bulgarian: сачми) pneumatic guns. A state regulation on melee weapons of any kind does not exist, whether knives, swords, bats, or electric devices. No juridical definition of "melee weapon" or "cold weapon" exists in any Bulgarian law. Hence, it is legal in Bulgaria to possess and carry a knife without providing any reason. Concealed knife carry is OK, anywhere and anytime.

Although there are no restrictions on possessing or carrying any type of knife or sword, it is not widely accepted or considered appropriate to carry a knife openly in public places such as streets or public buildings, stores, or restaurants. In urban areas, if a police officer sees open carrying of a larger knife, even if there is a legal right to do so, one can expect an instant check and hassle. From a societal point of view, the open carry of knives in Bulgaria is justified only in rural areas, when fishing or hunting, or when the knife serves as a tool in work activities, such as gardening. Some places like courts, banks, clubs, bars, etc. will deny one access to any weapon (knives included), and most do not offer a safekeeping option.

As it is an urban legend in Bulgaria that knives above 10 cm (3.9 in) are illegal to carry, police encourage carriers to surrender such knives voluntarily. Advocacy groups suggest that carriers instead state the purpose of "daily needs", "utility usage", or "self-defense" for carrying, and clarify the lack of crime. Requesting citation of an applicable (though nonexistent) law against such knife carrying often results in one keeping the knife and being issued a "warning". Otherwise, requesting police contact their superior officer often results in one retaining the knife. Some city councils issue acts to limit knife lengths above 10 cm (3.9 in) though such acts are considered illegal and with no compliance force since the councils have only administrative functions and no jurisdiction to invent or impose any laws.

Although Bulgaria is very liberal in terms of knife carrying and possession compared to many other countries, one needs to be familiar with the law regarding self-defense beforehand, whether defending oneself or others, with or without a weapon.

== Canada ==
There is no law banning the carrying in public of knives with sheaths, knives that take both hands to open, and any knife with a fixed blade and certain non-prohibited folding knives, if they are not carried for a purpose that poses a danger to public peace or to commit a criminal offense.

The Canadian Criminal Code criminalizes the possession of knives that open automatically. Section 84(1) defines "a knife that has a blade that opens automatically by gravity or centrifugal force or by hand pressure applied to a button, spring or other device attached to or in the handle of the knife" as a prohibited weapon. Only persons who have been granted exemption by the Royal Canadian Mounted Police through the Canadian Firearms Program are allowed to possess (but not acquire) prohibited weapons.

If a person is found in unauthorized possession of a prohibited knife by any law enforcement officer, the person is liable to a maximum of 5 years in jail and the weapon being seized. The Crown can then apply to a Provincial Court judge for the weapon to be forfeited and destroyed. The import and export of prohibited weapons is also strictly regulated and enforced by the Canada Border Services Agency.

Examples of prohibited knives include:

- any knife, including a switchblade, or butterfly knife with a blade that opens automatically by gravity or centrifugal force or by hand pressure applied to a button, spring, or other device in or attached to the handle of the knife;
- Constant Companion (belt-buckle knife);
- finger rings with blades or other sharp objects projecting from the surface;
- push daggers.

Manually-opened or 'one-handed' opening knives, including spring-assisted knives, that do not fall within the categories listed as prohibited weapons definition are legal to own and use, however importation of many of these items has been banned by the CBSA.

There is no length restriction on carrying knives within the Criminal Code. Still, there is a prohibition against carrying a knife if the possessor intends to carry it for a purpose dangerous to public peace or to commit a criminal offense.

== China ==
Due to concerns about potential violence at the 2008 Olympic Games in Beijing, China began restricting "dangerous knives", requiring that purchasers register with the government when purchasing these knives. Included in the new restrictions are knives with "blood grooves", lockblade knives, knives with blades measuring over 22 cm (8.7 in) in length, and knives with blades over 15 cm (5.9 in) in length also having a point angle of less than 60 degrees.

== Czech Republic ==
Czech weapon law from the year 2002 concerns firearms only, with no other legislation concerning knives in existence (except the paragraphs of the penal code penalizing the use of any weapons in criminal offenses). This means there are no restrictions on the possession or carrying of any types of knives or swords, whether openly or in a concealed manner.

== Denmark ==
Owning a knife:

Legal knives: In Denmark, folding knives (pocket knives) and fixed-blade knives are legal to own, if the blade is no longer than 12 cm (4.7 in). Blades over this length may only be legally owned if the possessor has a legitimate reason for owning the knife (knives for cooking at home, the knife used as a tool, an especially designed knife for hunting, a butcher's knife, and so on) or a special collector's permit.

Illegal knives: All knives with automatic-opening (switchblades), push daggers, gravity knives, disguised knives (belt-buckle knife, sword cane, etc.), knives with two-parted handles (butterfly knives), knives with ready access by the wearer (neck or belt knives, boot knives, etc.) are illegal to own or possess. Owning throwing knives and throwing in private or public is subject to permissions.

Carrying a knife: Generally, you can carry a knife if you have a legitimate reason.

1. used for work (artisans' tools)
2. used for accepted leisure activities, such as hunting, fishing, hiking, sailing, outdoor picnic, scouting, or other accepted leisure activities.

The knife should be appropriate for the task – a hunting knife only for hunting, and a boy scout cannot carry a butcher's knife – also you have to convincingly prove to the police, that you are on your way to an accepted leisure activity (no good to claim that you are going on a picnic, if you do not carry food, beverage and a blanket for it). The knife should be carried directly to and from the activity.

- Carrying a knife is an aggravated illegal activity in nightlife, as a spectator at sports events, during demonstrations, and mass gatherings – such as concerts/festivals, and other situations where you are likely to be drunk/intoxicated or excited. Schools and public transportation are generally no-go, unless you have a legitimate reason.
- Carrying an illegal knife in public is a very severe offence

Sanctions for violating the above-mentioned legislation for carrying a knife in public are usually only fines (normally 3000 DKK or more), but in case of repeated illegal knife carrying or for aggravated illegal knife carrying, you might go to jail (most often 4 months, but the maximum is 2 years). Danish police, army, state authorities, and the Royal Court of the Kingdom of Denmark are exempt from this legislation.

== France ==
In France, any knife of any blade length with a fixed blade, or a folding blade with a locking system, falls into unregulated Category D weapon (armes de catégorie D en vente libre). Unregulated category D weapons may be legally purchased if over 18 years of age, but they may not be carried on one's person, unless carried "for good reason", for example, as part of the tools of one's profession. If carried in a vehicle, such knives must be placed in a secure, locked compartment not accessible to the vehicle occupants. In addition, French law provides that authorities may classify any knife as a prohibited item depending upon circumstances and the discretion of the police or judicial authorities. Although "reasonable size" knives are tolerated in most circumstances, authorities may summarily confiscate them. Knives, whether they are fixed-blade or folding with a locking system, are also considered objects that can constitute a dangerous weapon for public safety, including types such as disguised knives, daggers, and knife-daggers.

Regarding sanctions, if an individual is found outside their residence, carrying or transporting a Category D weapon without a legitimate reason, they can incur a fine of up to €15,000 and a prison sentence of one year. If two or more individuals commit the offense, the fine can reach €30,000 with a prison sentence of two years.

== Germany ==
German knife law establishes three categories of knives: 1) prohibited knives; 2) knives designated as cutting and thrusting weapons; and 3) other knives. Some knives are additionally classified as restricted-use, in that they may be possessed in the home or business but not carried on the person. In addition, paragraph 42 section 5 of the Weapons Act gives each German state the option in certain areas to enact local regulations prohibiting the carrying of weapons "and any dangerous objects" in so-called "weapons ban" areas for purposes of protecting public safety and order. "Weapons ban" areas have been enacted in Berlin and Hamburg.

=== Cutting and thrusting weapons ===
Knives designated as cutting and thrusting weapons, but not otherwise specifically prohibited, may be possessed by persons 18 years and older. German law defines a cutting and thrusting weapon as any object intended to reduce or eliminate the ability of a person to attack another person or to defend themselves. This includes swords, sabers, daggers, stilettos, and bayonets. For example, a bayonet is a military weapon intended to injure or kill people, and it is regarded as a weapon by criminal law. In contrast, a machete is regarded as a tool to clear dense vegetation. Knives classed as cutting and thrusting weapons are generally restricted to possession and use on private property, and may not be carried in public or at certain public events.

=== Restricted-use knives ===
All knives that are not illegal may be legally purchased, owned, and used by anyone on private property. However, some knives are restricted from being carried in public, which is defined as exercising actual control of a restricted-class knife outside the home, business, or private property.

- All cutting and thrusting weapons such as daggers, swords, or stilettos (see above).
- All folding knives with a one-handed opening mechanism and can be locked with only one hand (whether automatic, assisted-opening, or manual). A knife with only one of these two features may be legal to carry (provided it does not violate the principles below and above).
- All knives with fixed blades over 12.0 cm (4.7 in)

Restricted-use knives may be carried if transported in a locked, sealed container, or if there is a commonly accepted legitimate purpose for carrying them, such as participation in a historical reenactment, sporting use (e.g., hunting), or as a necessary tool in a trade or business. The desire to defend oneself, or to use the knife as a tool without proof of necessity, is ordinarily not considered a legitimate purpose under the law.

== Greece ==
It is illegal to carry a knife as a weapon in attack or defense. The only general restriction is intended use, not the knife's properties (in particular, there is no restriction on blade length, despite popular belief). However, in practice there will be significant leeway for interpretation for police officers and judges – and much will depend on whether an intended use other than as a weapon can be argued – for which the properties of the knife in question will be very relevant (bad: flick-knife, automated, long blade, neck-knife, tactical). So, carrying a knife with its primary use as a weapon will be illegal. In addition, knives may not be carried in certain places, such as courtrooms, football matches, etc. Carrying knives is generally very unusual in towns, but not in the countryside.

Law 2168/1993 on weapons, explosives, etc.

"Article 1. Meaning of terms, applicability

...

§ 2. Objects that offer themselves [είναι πρόσφορα] to attack or defense are also considered weapons. In particular:

...

b) Knives of all sorts, except those where ownership is justified by use in the home, profession or education, or art, hunting, fishing, or other similar uses."

The remaining sections refer to: a) sprays and electro-shockers, c) knuckle dusters, clubs, nunchakus, etc., d) flame throwers or chemical sprays, e) fishing spear-guns.

No license is needed to import, trade, or carry knives for these uses (Art 7, 5).

See also the Areopagus' decision 1299/2008 where the intended use of the weapon found in the car of two criminals is the point of discussion.

A useful article from a hunting journal (in Greek).

== Hong Kong ==
Under the Weapons Ordinance (Cap 217), certain knives are designated as 'prohibited weapons' in this special administrative region of China, including:

- Gravity knife
- Knuckleduster, whether spiked or not, and with or without blade
- Any bladed or pointed weapon designed to be used in a fashion whereby the handle is held in a clenched fist and the blade or point protrudes between the fingers of the fist
- Any knife the blade of which is exposed by a spring or other mechanical or electric device

Possession of prohibited weapon is illegal under section 4 of the ordinance and offender is liable to a fine and to imprisonment for 3 years. Any Police officers or Customs officers can seize and detain any prohibited weapon. Once convicted, the weapon is automatically forfeited to the government and can then be disposed of by the Commissioner of Police.

== Hungary ==
Carrying a knife with a blade length over 8 cm (3.1 in) is prohibited in public places in Hungary unless justified by sport, work, or everyday activity. Automatic knives, throwing stars, and "French knives" are prohibited regardless of blade length and may be sold only to members of the army, law enforcement, and the national security agency. Violation may be punished with a fine up to Ft50,000. Possession at home and transportation in secure wrapping is allowed for everyone.

== Italy ==
Italians are restricted from buying and owning double-edged knives, automatic (open-assisted) knives, and swords. Carrying knives is permitted only for a 'valid reason', e.g., camping, fishing, etc., usually not in towns, and never for self-defense. Otherwise, only 'transport' is permitted, not 'at hand' but deep in your pack, etc.

There is considerable leeway in practice: police and border guards sometimes confiscate knives if they are 'too long', and some tourist sites have metal detectors that confiscate knives.

== Japan ==
"Swords" means a sword with a blade of 15 cm (5.9 in) or more requires permission from the prefectural public safety commission to possess. Permission requirements also apply to any sword over 6 cm (2.4 in) (including automatic knives), spears over 15 cm (5.9 in) in blade length, and Japanese glaves. All knives are prohibited from being carried, under a crime law, with an exception for carrying for duty or other justifiable reasons. Possession is considered a petty crime and is not usually punishable by prison time. However, in cases where assault occurs with a knife, there is a penalty of up to 2 years in prison or up to a ¥300,000 fine.

Following the 2008 Akihabara Knife Incident, Japan's knife laws were revised. Regardless of blade length, all knives are prohibited from carrying, except for lawful purposes. Such purposes include duty, work, or outdoor activities such as hunting, fishing, camping, hiking, etc. Blade length applies only to the illegal carrying of knives. A blade length of over 6 centimetres (2.4 in) becomes a violation of the jutouho 銃刀法 (gun and sword law), whereas under 6 cm (2.4 in) is a violation of the keihanzaihouihan 軽犯罪法案 (minor law violation). The former carries a heavier penalty than the latter. So unlike some other countries, blade length does not establish a right to legal carry. It only establishes the charge and degree of penalty. However, in practice, carrying alone is generally considered a minor crime unless used to carry out a criminal act.

"Swords" are traditional Japanese construction, where the tsuka (handle) and blade/tang can be separated by pushing through the mekugi. If it can not be taken apart, it is defined as a "knife" even if it looks like a tanto. Swords must be registered and carried with its ownership permit at all times. After the 2008 incident, all daggers (double-edged), and knives that have a "tanto" styled blade became prohibited by adding a definition – measurement of a straight line from the upper tip (kissaski) to the center of where the blade meets the guard or handle. If the line goes above the spine, it represents a curve and becomes classified as a sword. Additional knives prohibited are bayonets, butterfly knives, and switchblades/assisted open knives.

== Latvia ==
Latvian legislation "Law On the Handling of Weapons" defines knives as:

(1) Cold weapon – an object that has the features of a weapon and that is intended to cause damage utilising human muscle strength or special mechanisms.

and prohibits

(2) ..to carry non-firearm weapons except the non-firearm weapons necessary for hunters – in hunting and non-firearms necessary to sportsmen for the relevant sport – in competitions or training.

== Lithuania ==
According to Lithuanian law, possessing and carrying most types of knives is legal. This includes hunting knives, pocket knives, multi-tools, survivor knives, butterfly knives, etc., as knives are not considered weapons. The only exception is switchblades. It is illegal to carry or possess a switchblade if it meets one of the following criteria: the blade is longer than 8.5 cm; the width in the middle of the blade is less than 14% of its total length; the blade is double-sided.

== Luxembourg ==
According to the law of the 2nd of February 2022 on weapons and ammunition, knives that are considered to be bladed weapons are prohibited. No carry permit can be obtained, and carrying a knife can be punished by a fine and/or a prison sentence.

Certain bladed weapons, such as swords or bayonets, can be exempt and are subject to authorisation.

Pocket knives with a safety catch/detent/lock and without a guard are exempt as long as their blade fulfills all the following requirements:

- opens laterally from the handle
- requires two hands to be opened
- only has one cutting edge
- has a maximum length of 9 centimeters
- has a middle width of at least 20% of its length

Multi-tools with a blade that fits within the above parameters are also included, as are knives without a safety catch that fulfill all the other requirements, even if they can be opened one-handed. Knives with a fixed blade are also included as long as they fit the dimensions.

There are also exemptions for bladed and blunt weapons used for martial arts and other sports.

== Netherlands ==
=== National law ===
As of 2011, Dutch Law prohibits ownership or possession of the following knives:

- stilettos
- switchblades
- throwing knives
- folding knives with more than one cutting edge
- folding knives with an overall length of more than 28 cm (11 in) when deployed
- butterfly knives
- gravity knives
- disguised knives (belt knife, sword cane, etc.) and push daggers.

=== Local law ===
In addition to national laws, every Dutch city and urban district has the right to prohibit carrying any knife that can be used as a weapon in certain "safety risk" areas. Such a "no-go" area could include geographically limited urban areas such as bars, cafés, concerts, and public gatherings, a knife must be transported in such a manner so that it is not directly usable by the owner, such as storing the knife in a locked case for carrying in a backpack, or placing the locked-up knife in a storage area of a vehicle separate from the passenger compartment.

=== Notes ===
Additionally, it is illegal to carry a fixed-blade knife with multiple cutting edges. However, such a knife may be kept at home for collector purposes.

== New Zealand ==
Under New Zealand law, it is unacceptable to carry or possess a knife in public without a reasonable excuse. Two pieces of legislation restrict the possession of knives. Under the Summary Offences Act (s13A) there is a penalty of up to three months in prison or a fine of up to $2000 for possession, while under the Crimes Act (s202A) the penalty for carrying a knife as an offensive weapon in a public place is up to two years in prison. New Zealand law also prohibits importing knives that are considered offensive weapons.

== Norway ==
According to Norwegian law, one can spend up to 6 months in prison for purposefully bringing a knife or similar sharp tool especially suited for causing bodily harm to a public place, or for helping others do so. The law does not cover knives or other tools worn or used for work, outdoor pursuits, or similar reputable purposes. Note that this includes bringing knives in one's car. It is also illegal to buy, own, or store switchblade knives, butterfly knives, and stilettos.

== Poland ==
All kinds of knives are regarded as dangerous tools in the context of their usage in attack or self defense, but are not considered weapons under Polish law, so no restriction related to weapons apply. The exception is a blade hidden in an object that doesn't look like a weapon (a swordcane, a belt buckle knife, etc.). It is legal to sell, buy, trade, and possess any knives, and there is no restriction on blade length, type or shape.

Polish law does not prohibit carrying a knife in a public place; however, it is a misdemeanour to possess a knife, machete or "similar dangerous object" when other factors present can led the police to determine an intention to commit crime. This most often include publicly carrying unsheathed blade, participating in fights (even without using the knife) or making public threats. This misdemeanour law also applies to citizens attending a sport event or travelling in organized group to said event, aiming to prevent the football hooligan violence. The Polish Misdemeanour Code also outlaws possession of "dangerous tools and materials" during mass events and public gatherings. It is also worth noting that any object with distinguishable "blade" is covered by this law, including broken glass bottles. In all of the above misdemeanours, if the person is convicted, the bladed object is always forfeitured.

== Romania ==
A knife (a melee weapon with a blade) is considered illegal to carry in open spaces if it falls under the following conditions:

- The blade is either integral with the handle or equipped with a system which enables it to be joined to its handle;
- Has a double edge along its entire length;
- Its length is more than 15 cm;
- The width is bigger than or equal to 0,4 cm;
- Has a handle with a guard.

In addition to open spaces, knives are also forbidden in the premises of public institutions, meetings, and elections, or around persons of public interest. Offenders can be punished with prison time between one and three years, or a fine.

== Russia ==
Only certain knives are considered "melee weapons" and regulated in Russia, the others are common tools and are entirely unregulated, however violently using them is considered an "improvised weapon" usage and is an aggravating circumstance when the charges for an aggressive behavior are filed, and the local regulations may prevent bringing of "dangerous objects" to some events or businesses. The key point of knife regulations in Russia lies in determining whether the knife represents a weapon or an unregulated tool, which lies entirely within the opinion of a certified expert or an authorized certification board. In practice this means that there's no legal difference between the knife as a tool and as a weapon, and most given examples may be considered either, the only difference being the certificate issued by an authorized body, and any knife having this certificate being explicitly legal. Certifying the knives as a tool is not difficult, and most producers and importers do this by issuing a copy of a certificate with the knife during the sale for presentation to the police officers in case of an inquiry. However, unauthorized possession, creation, sale and transport of bladed weapons were decriminalized in 2001 and is now only a civil offence, carrying the penalty between 500 and 2000 rubles ($7.5 to $30) and/or a ban on a bladed weapon possession for 6 months to a year. Also, carrying any knife for self-defence (but not for other needs) is prohibited. For the knives considered weapons the law forbids only the throwing knives, and the automatic and gravity knives with the blades longer than 9 cm (3.5 in) (the shorter blades are allowed, providing the owner having the relevant permission).

== Serbia ==
The "Weapons and Munitions Law", Article 2, lists different types of weapons. It states that: "melee weapons, brass knuckles, dagger, kama, saber, bayonet and other items whose primary purpose is offense" are considered weapons. Most knives are therefore considered tools and technically legal to possess and carry. However, since any knife could be used a melee weapon and the law doesn't differentiate between particular types it is up to the authorities to determine the intent of the individual in possession of the knife and whether there is a "good reason" to do so. Thus, fixed-blade knives are considered appropriate for particular professions or when hunting and fishing, but will likely be treated as a weapon in an urban environment. Switchblades, butterfly knives, and blades concealed in everyday objects are usually treated as weapons, and assisted-opening knives may also fall into that category. The appearance of the knife (how aggressive it appears), the length (although there is no legal limit on length), the location where it was carried (large gatherings, schools, public buildings etc.) and the demeanor of the person carrying the knife all factor into the decision on whether the law has been broken. Purchase, possession and carry of a melee weapon is classified as a misdemeanor, subject to a fine of up to 10,000 dinars or up to 60 days imprisonment ("Weapons and Munitions law", article 35. In practice the less akin to a weapon the knife appears, and if carried and used with "good judgment" the lesser the likelihood of legal consequences.

== Slovakia ==
Carrying a knife in Slovakia is not explicitly prohibited, nor are there any prohibited types of knives. However, Act No. 372/1990 Offences Act states in paragraph 47 that carrying of a "cold weapon" such as a knife, dagger, or sabre in public places is a non-criminal offense to public safety if, from the circumstances of the case or the behaviour of the person, it can be concluded that these weapons can be used for violence or threats of violence. It is up to the individual to assess any single situation by a police officer and whether carrying such a weapon can lead to violence. This offense can be penalized with a fine as high as €500. An example of such a situation is visibly carrying a knife in crowded public places, public meetings, etc.

== Spain ==
In Spain, there are stringent laws proscribing the carrying of armas blancas, or fighting knives, and prohibiting the manufacture, sale, possession, or use of certain knives classified as prohibited. Armas blancas and other sharp-bladed instruments or cutting tools may be freely purchased and owned provided they are not on the list of prohibited weapons, are not purchased or possessed by minors, are kept at home for the exclusive purpose of a collection, and are not transported on the public roads. It is against the law generally to carry, display, or use any kind of knife in public, especially knives with pointed blades, unless one is on one's property or is working or engaged in a legitimate sporting activity requiring the use of such a knife.

The list of prohibited weapons is found in Anexo I – Armas prohibidas of the Real Decreto 137/1993 Por El Que Se Aprueba EL Reglamento de Armas, which prohibits the manufacture, importation, distribution, sale, possession and use of sword canes, automatic knives (switchblades), as well as daggers of any type. Knives with a double-edged, pointed-tip blade 11 cm (4.3 in) or less in length (measured from the forward end of the handle to the tip of the blade) are considered to be armas blancas, which may be owned, but not carried in public. The law also prohibits the marketing, advertising, sale, possession, and use of folding knives with a blade length exceeding 11 cm (4.3 in), measured from the bolster or top of the handle to the tip of the blade. Certain exceptions to the list of prohibited knives exist for legitimate knife collections and historical artifacts registered with the Guardia Civil for possession exclusively at one's home.

Civilians are prohibited from possessing knives, machetes, and other bladed weapons officially issued to the police, military, and other official authorities without a special license. Sale of such weapons requires presenting an official arms license duly certifying the identity and status of the person entitled to possess such weapons.

== Sweden ==
Swedish law prohibits carrying knives in public areas, including schools and vehicles in these areas, unless the carrier has a legitimate purpose for carrying a knife. Examples of legitimate purposes include artisans who use a knife at work, soldiers in uniform carrying a knife, hiking & camping purposes or the normal use of a pocket knife. The same law also regulates some other objects made to thrust, cut, or otherwise intended for crime against life and health. Furthermore, objects that are "particularly" intended for crime against life and health, such as switchblades, shurikens, and brass knuckles, are not permitted to be owned by, given to, or sold to anyone under the age of 21. Carrying a weapon for self-defence does not count as a legitimate purpose.

== United Kingdom ==
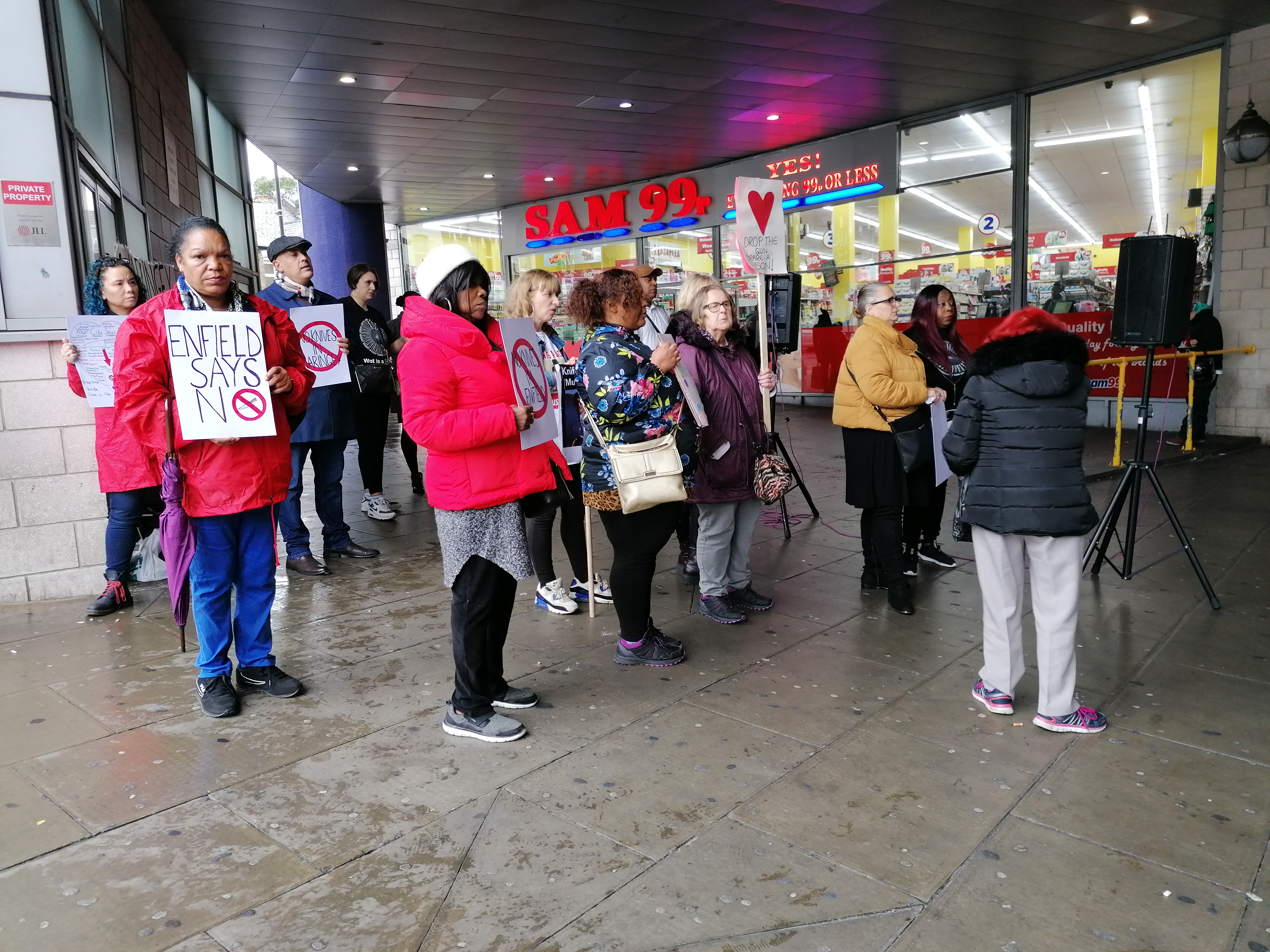
An anti-knife crime demonstration in Wood Green, North London, October 2019

The United Kingdom is a political union of four different countries, with three distinct (different) legal jurisdictions (England and Wales, Scotland and Northern Ireland). As such, the law related to the purchasing and possessing weapons (such as knives) varies depending on which part of the UK a person resides in. Overall, the UK has some of the strictest knife legislation in the world.

In general, knife crime is one of the leading causes of violent crime in the UK, with 50,510 knife-related offences recorded in England and Wales in the year ending March 2024. Statistics for knife-related crime have increased by 78% (in England and Wales) over the past 10 years, as per statistics recorded by the Office for National Statistics (ONS).

A 2019 survey of 2,000 UK parents showed that 72% were worried their child could become a victim of knife crime with one in 13 saying they know of a youngster who has been a victim directly.

Details on legislation (per jurisdiction) can be found in the table below:

=== England and Wales ===
In England and Wales, the sale of most knives are legal (Note: Certain knives are prohibited under UK law including: belt buckle knives; butterfly knives; cyclone or spiral knives; disguised knives; flick, gravity, switchblade, or automatic knives; Kyoketsu shoge knives; push daggers; swords, swordsticks, stealth knives, and zombie knives).), subject to age restrictions, and restrictions on use outside of a domestic setting.

=== History ===
Since 1953 the British Parliament has passed 6 Acts regulating civilian access to knives.

=== Prevention of Crime Act 1953 ===
The Prevention of Crime Act 1953 prohibits possessing an offensive weapon in any public place without lawful authority or reasonable excuse. The term "offensive weapon" is defined as: "any article made or adapted for use to causing injury to the person, or intended by the person having it with him for such use".

Under the Prevention of Crime Act, otherwise 'exempt' knives carried for "good reason or lawful authority" may still be deemed illegal if authorities conclude the knife is being carried as an "offensive weapon". In recent years, the Prevention of Crime Act 1953 has been reinterpreted by police and public prosecutors, who have persuaded the courts to minimize exceptions to prosecution because the defendant had "lawful authority or reasonable excuse" to apply the Act to various cases. This new approach now includes prosecution of citizens who have admitted carrying a knife for the sole purpose of self-defence (in the eyes of the law, this is presently viewed as an admission that the defendant intends to use the knife as an "offensive weapon", albeit in a defensive manner, and otherwise justifiable circumstances). While the onus lies on the officer to prove offensive intent, prosecutors and courts have in the past taken the appearance and the marketing of a particular brand of knife into account when considering whether an otherwise legal knife was being carried as an offensive weapon. In addition, the Knives Act 1997 now prohibits the sale of combat knives and restricts the marketing of knives as offensive weapons. A knife which is marketed as "tactical", "military", "special ops", etc., could therefore carry an extra liability.

The offense wording under Section 1 of the Prevention of Crime Act 1953 refers to 'causing injury to the person'. This opens a separate category for a self-defense tool intended and made for use against animals (e.g., Biteback dog spray) or a tool to be used against a person but not designed, intended, or adapted to cause injury (e.g., a pressure point tool).

=== Restriction of Offensive Weapons Act 1959 ===
The 1689 Bill of Rights ensured that only Parliament and not the King could restrict the people's right to bear arms. Since 1959, Parliament has enacted a series of increasingly restrictive laws and acts regarding the possession and use of knives and bladed tools.

The Restriction of Offensive Weapons Act 1959 (amended 1961) (ROWA), prohibits the importation, sale, hire, lending, or gift of certain types of knives in England and Wales, as of 13 June 1959 under Section 1:

(1) Any person who manufactures, sells or hires or offers for sale or hire, or exposes or has in his possession for the purpose of sale or hire or lends or gives to any other person—

(a) any knife which has a blade which opens automatically by hand pressure applied to a button, spring or other device in or attached to the handle of the knife, sometimes known as a flick knife or "flick gun"; or
(b) any knife which has a blade which is released from the handle or sheath thereof by the force of gravity or the application of centrifugal force and which, when released, is locked in place by means of a button, spring, lever, or other device, sometimes known as a gravity knife,

shall be guilty of an offence [...]

Subsection 2 also makes it illegal to import knives of this type as of 13 June 1959. The above legislation criminalizes the conduct of the original owner or transferor of an automatic-opening or gravity knife, not the new owner or transferee; in addition, the statute does not criminalize possession of such knives other than possession for sale or hire. It is therefore not illegal per se to merely possess such a knife, though the difficulties of acquiring one without violating the statute make it (almost) impossible to obtain one without either committing or abetting an offence.

The above legislation does not apply to assisted-opening knives (a.k.a. semi-auto knives) as two elements to this definition separate them. Firstly, they do not open 'automatically' as they are opened by hand manually and then continue themselves. Secondly, the pressure is applied to a notch in the blade itself, not to a "button, spring or other device in or attached to the handle". As of April 2018, the Home Office have made proposals to update the Criminal Justice Act 1988 to add assisted-opening knives to the increasing list of prohibited items under this act.

=== Criminal Justice Act 1988 ===
The Criminal Justice Act 1988 mainly relates to carrying knives in public places, Section 139 being the most important:

(1) Subject to subsections (4) and (5) below, any person who has an article to which this section applies with them in a public place shall be guilty of an offence.
(2) Subject to subsection (3) below, this section applies to any article which has a blade or is sharply pointed except a folding pocketknife.
(3) This section applies to a folding pocketknife if the cutting edge of its blade exceeds 3 inches (7.6 cm).
(4) It shall be a defence for a person charged with an offence under this section to prove that he had good reason or lawful authority for having the article with him in a public place.

The definition of "public place" is defined in Section 139(7) Criminal Justice Act 1988 as:
"In this section "public place" includes any place to which at the material time the public have or are permitted access, whether on payment or otherwise."

This can be loosely defined as anywhere the public has a legitimate right to be, whether this access is paid for or not, which could include any populated area within England and Wales, including one's motor vehicle, which is defined by law as a 'public place' unless parked on private property. A public place could include: 1) an organised wilderness gathering or event; 2) a National Park; 3) Forestry Commission land that is held open to the public; 4) public footpaths; 5) bridleways; and 6) any area where an individual does not need to ask specific permission to walk, camp, or travel from a landowner. Non-public places would be a person's residence, the area behind a counter in a shop, a locked building site, etc. – essentially anywhere a person would have to unlawfully commit trespass to gain access to.

The phrase "good reason or lawful authority" in Subsection 4 is intended to allow for "common sense" possession of knives, so that it is legal to carry a knife if there is a bona fide reason to do so. Subsection 5 gives some specific examples of bona fide reasons: a knife for use at work (e.g., a chef's knife), as part of a national costume, or for religious reasons (e.g., a Sikh kirpan). However, even these specific statutory exceptions have sometimes proven unavailing to knife owners. "Good reason or lawful authority" exceptions may be difficult to establish for those not using a knife in the course of their trade or profession, but merely because the knife is needed in case of emergency or for occasional utility use.

Although English law insists that it is the prosecution's responsibility to provide evidence proving a crime has been committed, an individual must provide evidence to prove that they had a "good reason or lawful authority" for carrying a knife (if this is the case) upon being detained. While this may appear to be a reversal of the usual burden of proof, technically the prosecution has already proven the case (prima facie) by establishing that a knife was being carried in a public place (see Violent Crime Reduction Act 2006 on Knives, etc.; New powers to tackle gun and knife crime)

As the burden of proving "good reason or lawful authority" lies with the defendant, it is likely that an individual detained and searched by the police will need to prove the following (sometimes known as the THIS list): Has THIS person got permission; to use THIS article (knife); for THIS use; on THIS land; and by THIS land owner.

The special exception which exists in the Criminal Justice Act 1988 (Sec. 139) for folding knives (pocket knives with non-locking blades) with a cutting edge (not blade) less than 3 inches (7.6 cm) long, is another "common sense" measure accepting that some small knives are carried for general utility; This exemption however only applies to folding knives without a locking mechanism. The wording of the Criminal Justice Act does not mention locking, so the definition of "folding pocket knife" was settled through case law. In the Crown Court appeal of Harris v. DPP (1992) and the Court of Appeal case of R. v Deegan (1998) the ruling that 'folding' was intended to mean 'non-locking' was upheld. As the only higher court in England and Wales to the Court of Appeal is the Supreme Court, the only way the decision in R. v. Deegan could be overturned is by a dissenting ruling by the Supreme Court or by Act of Parliament.

=== Offensive Weapons Act 1996 ===
The Offensive Weapons Act 1996 covers the possession of knives within school premises:

(1) Any person who has an article to which section 139 of this Act applies with him on school premises shall be guilty of an offence.
(2) Any person who has an offensive weapon within the meaning of section 1 of the M1 Prevention of Crime Act 1953 with him on school premises shall be guilty of an offence.
(3) It shall be a defence for a person charged with an offence under subsection (1) or (2) above to prove that he had good reason or lawful authority for having the article or weapon with him on the premises in question.
(4) (Subsection 4 gives the same specific exceptions as subsection 139(5) with the addition of "for educational purposes". This would appear to imply that all legislation on knives in public applies similarly to school premises, and therefore a folding pocket knife with a cutting edge (not blade) under 3 inches (7.6 cm) in length would be considered legal.

The Offensive Weapons Act 1996 imposes an age restriction of 16 on the sale of knives:

(1) Any person who sells to a person under the age of sixteen years an article to which this section applies shall be guilty of an offence [...]
(2) Subject to subsection (3) below, this section applies to—

(a) any knife, knife blade or razor blade...

The Criminal Justice Act 1988 (Offensive Weapons) (Exemption) Order 1996 states restrictions to sales of knives to those under 16 does not apply to:

- folding pocket-knife if the cutting edge of its blade does not exceed 7.62 cm (3 in)
- razor blades permanently enclosed in a cartridge or housing where less than 2 mm (3/32 in) of any blade is exposed beyond the plane which intersects the highest point of the surfaces preceding and following such blades.

These age restrictions in the Criminal Justice Act 1988 were increased to 18, effective from 1 October 2007, by the Violent Crime Reduction Act 2006.

=== Knives Act 1997 ===
The Knives Act 1997 prohibits the sale of combat knives and restricts the marketing of knives as offensive weapons.

=== Crime and Policing Act 2026 ===
Crime and Policing Act 2026 introduced 'Ronan's Law' which further toughens British knives regulation.

The Act creates a new offence of possessing weapons with intent to cause harm, with penalties of four to seven years in prison. It introduces fines for tech executives up to £10,000, and companies up to £60,000, for failing to remove illegal knife content. It increases maximum penalties for illegal possession, importation, or sale of prohibited weapons and selling to under-18s to two years. Also, it widens the ban on 'zombie-style' knives to include knives with specific physical features like serrated edges or spikes, obligates retailers to report sales of six or more knives to the same buyer or address within 30 days to the police and adds two-step age verification requirements for online purchases. Lastly, it gives police powers to seize and destroy knives on private property if they are suspected of being used for violence and entry of premises without warrants to retrieve GPS-tracked items.

=== Proposals ===
In May 2018, Nic Madge, a judge at Luton Crown Court, proposed that kitchen knives sold to or used by members of the public should have rounded rather than pointed ends. Judge Madge said that implementation of the proposal would lead to a "substantial" reduction in the number of life-threatening injuries caused by stabbings. A similar proposal had been made in 2005 by three emergency medicine health professionals from West Middlesex University Hospital.

=== Case law ===
Case law in 2005 stated that even a butter knife can be classed as a bladed article in a public place.

=== Scotland ===
In Scotland, the Criminal Law (Consolidation) (Scotland) Act 1995 prevents the carrying of offensive weapons as well as pointed or bladed articles in a public place without lawful authority or reasonable excuse. Defences exist to a charge of possessing a bladed or pointed article in a public place when carried for use at work, as part of a national costume, or for religious reasons. As in England and Wales, an exception is allowed for folding pocket knives which have a blade of less than 3 inches (7.6 cm)

Other relevant Scotland knife legislation includes the Criminal Justice Act 1988 (Offensive Weapons Act) (Scotland) Order 2005, which bans sword canes, push daggers, butterfly knives, throwing stars, knives that can defeat metal detectors, and knives disguised as other objects, and the Police, Public Order and Criminal Justice (Scotland) Act 2006, which makes it an offence to sell a knife, knife blade, or bladed or pointed object to a person under eighteen years of age, unless the person is sixteen or older. The knife or blade is "designed for domestic use." In 2007, the Custodial Sentences and Weapons (Scotland) Act 2007 allowed exemption from criminal liability under section 141 of the Criminal Justice Act 1988 for selling a prohibited offensive weapon if the sale was made for purposes of theatrical performances and of rehearsals for such performances, the production of films (as defined in section 5B of the Copyright, Designs and Patents Act 1988), or the production of television programmes (as defined in section 405(1) of the Communications Act 2003).

Under the Custodial Sentences and Weapons (Scotland) Act 2007 (in force since 10 September 2007), the Civic Government (Scotland) Act 1982 was amended and it was made compulsory to possess a local authority licence to sell knives, swords and blades (other than those designed for 'domestic use'), or to sell any sharply pointed or bladed object "which is made or adapted for use for causing injury to the person." Any dealer in non-domestic knives will be required to hold a 'knife dealer's licence'.

=== Northern Ireland ===
The laws restricting knife ownership, use, possession and sale are nearly identical to the laws of Scotland and the rest of the UK, though contained in different acts. In 2008, in response to a surge in public concern over knife-related crimes, Northern Ireland doubled the prison sentence for persons convicted of possessing a knife deemed to be an offensive weapon in a public place to four years' imprisonment. It added an evidential presumption in favour of prosecution for knife possession.

== United States ==
=== Federal laws ===
Under the Switchblade Knife Act of 1958 (amended 1986, codified at 15 U.S.C. §§1241–1245), switchblades and ballistic knives are banned from interstate shipment, sale, or importation, or possession within the following: any territory or possession of the United States, i.e., land belonging to the U.S. federal government; Native American lands (as defined in section 1151 of title 18); and areas within the maritime or territorial jurisdiction of the federal government, except for federal, state law enforcement agencies and the military. Federal laws may prohibit possessing or carrying any knife on certain federal properties such as courthouses or military installations. U.S. federal laws on switchblades do not apply to the possession or sale of switchblade knives within a state's boundaries; the latter is regulated by the laws of that particular state, if any.

Disputes over what constitutes a switchblade knife under federal law have occasionally resulted in U.S. Customs seizures of knives from U.S. importers or manufacturers. In one case, the seizure of a shipment of Columbia River Knife & Tool knives resulted in an estimated US$1 million loss to the company before the shipment was released.

Amendment 1447 to the Switchblade Knife Act (15 U.S.C. §1244), signed into law as part of the FY2010 Homeland Security Appropriations Bill on October 28, 2009, provides that the Act shall not apply to spring-assist or assisted-opening knives (i.e., knives with closure-biased springs that require physical force applied to the blade to assist in opening the knife).

=== State and local laws ===
Each state also has laws that govern the legality of carrying weapons, either concealed or openly, and these laws explicitly or implicitly cover various types of knives. Some states go beyond this and criminalize the mere possession of certain types of knives. Other states prohibit the possession or the concealed carrying of knives that feature blade styles or features sufficient to transform them into "dangerous weapons" or "deadly weapons", i.e., knives either optimized for lethality against humans or designed for and readily capable of causing death or serious bodily injury. These frequently include knives with specific blade styles with a historical connection to violence or assassination, including thrusting knives such as the dirk, poignard, and stiletto, the bowie knife, and double-edged knives with crossguards designed for knife fighting such as the dagger. Some states make the carrying or possession of any dangerous or deadly weapon with intent to unlawfully harm another a crime.

Summaries of every state knife law are available from handgun law websites.

==== Historical origin ====
The origin of many knife laws, particularly in the southern states, comes from attempts by early state legislatures to curtail the practice of knife fighting and dueling with large knives such as the bowie knife, which was commonly carried as an item of personal defense before the invention of the revolver. In Alabama, Mississippi, New Mexico, and Virginia, the carrying on one's person of large and lengthy fighting knives capable of causing grievous wounds such as the Bowie knife is prohibited by statute, Originally, in the interest of controlling or eliminating the then-common practice of dueling, a term which had degenerated from a rarely used social custom into a generalized description for any knife or gun fight between two contestants. In many jurisdictions, a local tradition of using knives to settle differences or for self-defense resulted in the enactment of statutes that restricted the size and length of the knife and, particularly, the length of its blade.

After the Civil War, many restrictions on knife and even gun ownership were imposed by state, county, and city laws and ordinances that were clearly based on fear of weapon possession by certain racial groups, particularly African-American and Hispanic Americans. In some states, so-called "Black Codes" adopted after the Civil War required Black People to obtain a license before carrying or possessing firearms or Bowie knives. The governments of Texas and other former states of the Confederacy, many of which had recognized the right to carry arms such as Bowie knives openly before the Civil War, passed new restrictions on both gun and knife possession and use. In some cases, these laws were directed at formerly enslaved people and other minorities; in other cases, by reconstruction legislatures anxious to disarm rebellious militias and groups seeking to disenfranchise African-American and other minorities. The April 12, 1871 law passed by Texas' Reconstruction legislature is typical, and is the ancestor of the present law restricting knife possession and use in Texas:

Any person carrying on or about his person, saddle, or in his saddle-bags, any pistol, dirk, dagger, sling-shot, sword-cane, spear, brass knuckles, bowie knife, or any other kind of knife, manufactured or sold, for offense or defense, unless he has reasonable grounds for fearing an unlawful attack on his person, and that such ground of attack shall be immediate and pressing; or unless having or carrying the same on or about his person for the lawful defense of the State, as a militiaman in actual service, or as a peace officer or policeman, shall be guilty of a misdemeanor..."

While most gun restrictions were eventually repealed, many knife laws remained in effect in the South. In Texas, this was largely explained by the presence of large numbers of Tejanos. By 1870, Texas whites of the day had almost universally and exclusively adopted the revolver for self-defense, while Tejanos, steeped in the blade culture (el legado Andaluz) of Mexico and Spain and generally without the means to purchase handguns, continued to carry knives. Thus, while local and state Texas gun laws and ordinances were gradually relaxed or eliminated during the late 1800s, the old prohibitions against bowie knives, daggers, dirks, and other long-bladed knives remained on the books since they served to disarm and control a minority group viewed as engaging in lawless behaviors and violence without legal justification. The Texas law remained on the books for almost 150 years, until modified in 2017 to allow carrying these weapons with some restrictions.

==== Interpreting current state laws ====
Many of today's state criminal codes restricting knife use and ownership have been amended repeatedly over the years rather than rewritten to remove old classifications and definitions that are essentially a historical legacy. This process frequently results in illogical, confusing, and even conflicting provisions. Thus in Arkansas, a state in which knife fights using large, lengthy blades such as the Bowie and Arkansas toothpick were once commonplace, a state statute made it illegal for someone to "carry a knife as a weapon", specifying that any knife with a blade 3.5 inches (8.9 cm) or longer constituted prima facie evidence that the knife was being carried as a weapon, yet allowed a complete exemption to the law when "upon a journey".

While Arkansas eventually repealed its archaic criminal knife possession law, other states still periodically amend archaic criminal codes that penalize historical and present-day behavior involving knife use and ownership; these patchwork statutes can result in lengthy legal disputes over legislative intent and definitions. As one example, Indiana law makes it illegal to possess a "dagger, dirk, poniard, stiletto, switchblade knife, or gravity knife" on school property, or to possess any knife on school property "capable of being used to inflict cutting, stabbing, or tearing wounds" if that knife "is intended to be used as a weapon", but provides for a criminal penalty only if a person "recklessly, knowingly, or intentionally" possesses such a knife on school property. The statute thus requires 1) an examination of the knife and the legislative history of the statute; 2) expert testimony on the individual characteristics of historic knife designs to determine whether the knife in question fits within one of the six specified categories of a knife; 3) a determination as to whether the blade can cause a "cutting, stabbing, or tearing wound"; 4) a determination as to what degree of injury constitutes a "wound", and 5) two separate determinations of the defendant's intent by the fact finder – before guilt or innocence may be adjudged.

Some states prohibit the possession of a folding knife with a quick-opening mechanism such as a gravity knife, butterfly knife, or switchblade. Other states may impose no restrictions at all, while many allow possession with some restrictions (age, carrying on one's person, carrying concealed, carrying while a convicted felon, prohibited possessor, or while in the commission of a serious offense, etc.)

The continual advent of new knife designs, such as assisted-opening knives, can complicate legality issues, particularly when state laws have not been carefully drafted to clearly define the new design and how it is classified within existing law. This omission has led to cases where state courts have substituted their understanding of knife design to interpret legislative intent when applying statutes criminalizing certain types of knives.

In 2014, attention was brought by many newspapers and media outlets to 1950s-era legislation leading to many arrests and convictions for possession of the loosely defined gravity knife. This law was later declared unconstitutionally vague and subsequently repealed.

=== City, county, and local laws ===
City, county, and local jurisdictions (to include sovereign Native American nations located within a state boundary) may enact criminal laws or ordinances in addition to the restrictions contained in state laws, which may be more restrictive than state law. Virtually all states and local jurisdictions have laws that restrict or prohibit the possession or carrying of knives in some form or manner in certain defined areas or places such as schools, public buildings, courthouses, police stations, jails, power plant facilities, airports, or public events.

Local or city ordinances are sometimes drafted to include specific classes of people not covered by the state criminal codes, such as individuals carrying folding knives with locking blades primarily for use as weapons. For example, a San Antonio, Texas city ordinance makes it unlawful for anyone to knowingly carry within city limits "on or about his person" any folding knife with a blade less than 5.5 inches (14 cm) long with a lock mechanism that locks the blade upon opening. This ordinance is designed to work in tandem with the Texas state statute making illegal the carrying of knives with blades longer than 5.5 inches (14 cm). The San Antonio ordinance allows police to charge persons carrying most types of lock blade knives without good cause with a criminal misdemeanor violation, allowing police to remove the knife from the possession of the offender, while providing exemptions from the ordinance designed to protect certain classes of people the city assumes to pose no threat to public order. This ordinance was negated in 2015 when Texas adopted a statewide law preempting any expansion of state knife law by local government entities. Occasionally, city and county ordinances conflict with state law. In one example, the city of Portland, Oregon initially passed a city ordinance banning all pocket knives, until the measure was overturned by the Oregon Supreme Court as conflicting with state criminal statutes.

=== Constitutional protection ===
The constitutional status of knives as being protected arms under the Second Amendment (or state analogs to the Second Amendment) is currently being litigated in light of recent Supreme Court rulings. In the landmark ruling New York State Rifle & Pistol Association v. Bruen (2022), an expansive definition is accepted: "Thus, even though the Second Amendment's definition of "arms" is fixed according to its historical understanding, that general definition covers modern instruments that facilitate armed self-defense." In October 2026, the U.S. Court of Appeals for the Fifth Circuit ruled in Knife Rights, Inc. v. Blanche (2026) that the federal ban on the interstate sale of switchblade knives violated the Second Amendment.

The Massachusetts Supreme Judicial Court ruled in Commonwealth vs. David E. Canjura (2024) that a ban on carrying a switchblade knife violates the right to bear arms under the Second Amendment.

The United States Court of Appeals for the Ninth Circuit ruled in Teter v. Lopez (2023) that banning pocket knives (including butterfly knives) has no historical analog from the founding era and is unconstitutional.

The California Court of Appeal ruled in People v. Mitchell (2012) that prohibiting the concealed carrying of a dirk or dagger is constitutional.

The Connecticut Supreme Court ruled in State v. DeCiccio (2014) that the Second Amendment protects dirk knives and police batons.

The Delaware Supreme Court ruled in Griffin v. State (2012) that carrying a concealed knife in one's home is constitutionally protected.

The Indiana Court of Appeals ruled in Lacy v. State (2009) that possession of a knife with an automatic opening blade is not constitutionally protected.

The New Jersey Supreme Court ruled in State v. Lee (1984) that a statute prohibiting a person who knowingly possesses a weapon other than certain firearms "under circumstances not manifestly appropriate for such lawful uses as it may have is guilty of a crime of the fourth degree" is constitutional and that "intent to use for an unlawful purpose" is not an element of the offense; State v. Wright (1984) that being prosecuted for strapping a knife to one's leg was justified; State v. Blaine (1987) that walking in public with a pocket knife in one's pocket is insufficient for conviction; State v. Riley (1997) that carrying, but not displaying or brandishing, a pocket knife is insufficient for conviction; State v. Montalvo (2017) that possession of a machete in the home for self-defense is constitutionally protected.

The New Mexico Court of Appeals ruled in State v. Murillo (2015) that switchblades are not constitutionally protected.

The Ohio Court of Appeals ruled in Akron v. Rasdan (1995) that Akron's ordinance prohibiting carrying of a knife with 2.5 inches (6.4 cm) or longer blade to be unconstitutional.

The Oregon Supreme Court ruled in State v. Kessler (1980) and State v. Blocker (1981) that prohibiting the possession of a billy club is unconstitutional; applying the same logic, the court ruled in State v. Delgado (1984) that prohibiting the possession and carrying of switchblades is also unconstitutional; and also applied the same to blackjacks in Barnett v. State (1985).

The Washington Supreme Court ruled in City of Seattle v. Montana and McCullough (1996) that kitchen knives are not constitutionally protected; City of Seattle v. Evans (2015) that some knives may be protected, but paring knives are not.

The Wisconsin Court of Appeals ruled in State v. Herrmann (2015) that prohibiting possession of a switchblade in the home is unconstitutional.

== See also ==
- Offensive weapon
- Self-defense
- Weapon possession (crime)
