= Light Decision =

Light Decision is a 2010 UK short film directed by Juriaan Booji for Work of Art Films that raises awareness about social issues associated with teenage knife crime in London. It was written by Ewa Cichon and produced by Ewa Cichon and Kay Headley who also plays the role of the father-Cassius Paterson, who is the main character in the film. Light Decision was presented at the Cannes Film Festival 2010 Short Film Corner.

== Background ==
Writer and Producer Ewa Cichon first came up with the idea for the film in 2008, when knife crime in London was on the rise. With each press report of another murder, there always seemed to have been someone stating that "lessons must be learnt...", which eventually became the theme of the film Light Decision – How many "lessons" do we have to learn before we finally decide to do something?

== Production ==
In April 2009, Juriaan Booij, an RCA graduate and a filmmaker best known for his documentary about a sinking nation of Tuvalu "King Tide", was filming his graduation short film "Conformists". Juriaan cast Kay Headley and Tom Bonington, both actors who went on to star in 'Light Decision'. Ewa Cichon had been asked to take stills from the set and that's how Ewa and Juriaan met. Having been very impressed with Juriaan's style as a director, Ewa and Kay set up a meeting with him and "Conformists" Director of Photography Justin Brown for August 2009 to discuss the script for "Light Decision". Principal photography commenced on 6 October 2009, when the beginning of the film had been shot. After finding a new DOP (Tom Turley), the filming continued in November 2009. By the end of January 2010 the film had been edited by Kay Headley and Ewa Cichon with input from the director. Kay Headley composed the music for the film and designed the sound. In March 2010, the film had been entered to Cannes Film Festival Short Film Corner and the London Film Festival.

== Cast ==
- Cassius Patterson- Kay Headley
- Sean Patterson- Kane Headley- Cummings
- Tom- Tom Bonington
- Jenny- Tina Meegan
- Chris- Ann Etchells
- Martin- Alex Murphy
- Jamal- Jonathan Renner
- Carlton- Maniki Boulasi
- Reporter- Sophie Lois Hemphill
