= Deadly weapon =

Legal term

A deadly weapon, sometimes dangerous weapon (although some jurisdictions differentiate between the two) or lethal weapon, is an item that can inflict mortal or great bodily harm. By statutory definition, certain items, especially firearms, are designated "deadly weapons per se", meaning they are regarded as deadly weapons no matter how they are used, from the Latin for "by itself". In addition, deadly weapons statutes often contain provisions covering other implements intended to be used to inflict harm.

The use or possession of a deadly weapon during the commission of a crime often constitutes a penalty enhancer. The deadly weapon penalty enhancer is premised on a belief that commission of the particular crime is inherently more dangerous.

In some jurisdictions, a distinction is made between deadly weapons and destructive devices, such as explosives, incendiary or poison gas, bombs, grenades, landmines, rockets, missiles, or similar devices, including the unassembled components from which such devices can be made.

== Deadly weapons per se ==
A deadly weapon per se is usually defined as a firearm and may include knives of a certain length (usually three inches or longer, depending on jurisdiction). Statutes list weapons such as switchblade, gravity knife, ballistic knife, stiletto, sword, dagger, blackjack, brass knuckles, nunchaku (fighting sticks), shuriken (throwing stars), among others.

== Other deadly weapons ==
Any object designed, made, or adapted for the purposes of inflicting death or serious physical injury can be considered a deadly weapon.

For example, a shoe or a shod foot used for kicking may be considered a dangerous weapon. A man from Florida was charged with aggravated assault with a deadly weapon after throwing a live alligator through the open drive-through window of a fast food restaurant. In Texas a federal grand jury decided that a flashing GIF, intended to provoke an epileptic seizure resulting in death, can be considered as a deadly weapon.

== Examples of statutes ==
=== In Wisconsin ===
In Wisconsin, statute §939.22(10) defines dangerous weapon:

"Dangerous weapon" means any firearm, whether loaded or unloaded; any device designed as a weapon and capable of producing death or great bodily harm; any electric weapon, as defined in s. 941.295 (4); or any other device or instrumentality which, in the manner it is used or intended to be used, is calculated or likely to produce death or great bodily harm.

=== In Pennsylvania ===
Pennsylvania Crimes Code, Title 18 Pa.C.S.A. § 2301. Definitions.

"Deadly Weapon." Any firearm, whether loaded or unloaded, or any device designed as a weapon and capable of producing death or serious bodily injury, or any other device or instrumentality which, in the manner in which it is used or intended to be used, is calculated or likely to produce death or serious bodily injury. (effective June 6, 1973)

=== In Maine ===
In Maine, the definition of "dangerous weapon" includes firearms, each of are defined in Title 17-A M.R.S.A § 2 sub (9) & (12-A);

17-A M.R.S.A. § 2(9) Dangerous weapon: A. "Use of a dangerous weapon" means the use of a firearm or other weapon, device, instrument, material or substance, whether animate or inanimate, which, in the manner it is used or threatened to be used is capable of producing death or serious bodily injury. B. "Armed with a dangerous weapon" means in actual possession, regardless of whether the possession is visible or concealed, of: (1) A firearm; (2) Any device designed as a weapon and capable of producing death or serious bodily injury; or (3) Any other device, instrument, material or substance, whether animate or inanimate, which, in the manner it is intended to be used by the actor, is capable of producing or threatening death or serious bodily injury. For purposes of this definition, the intent may be conditional. C. When used in any other context, "dangerous weapon" means a firearm or any device designed as a weapon and capable of producing death or serious bodily injury.

17-A M.R.S.A. § 2(12-A) Firearm: "Firearm" means any weapon, whether loaded or unloaded, which is designed to expel a projectile by the action of an explosive and includes any such weapon commonly referred to as a pistol, revolver, rifle, gun, machine gun or shotgun. Any weapon which can be made into a firearm by the insertion of a firing pin, or other similar thing, or by repair, is a firearm.

=== In Florida ===
Sec. 21-14. - Dangerous weapons; penalty; trial court. (a) Concealed dangerous weapons. It shall be unlawful for any person to wear under his clothes, or concealed about his person, or to display in a threatening manner any dangerous or deadly weapon including, but not by way of limitation, any pistol, revolver, slingshot, cross-knuckles or knuckles of lead, brass or other metal, or any bowie knife, razor, dirk, dagger, or any knife resembling a bowie knife, or any other dangerous or deadly weapon, except as hereinafter provided. Note— Florida Statutes § 790.33, as amended, preempts and declares null and void all local ordinances, administrative regulations and rules in the field of firearms and ammunition, with limited exceptions set forth in § 790.33, as amended.

== See also ==
- Offensive weapon
