= Butterfly knife =

Type of folding knife

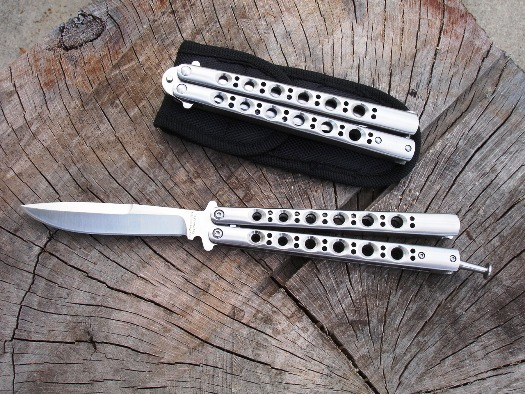
Two butterfly knives in closed and open positions

A balisong, also known as a butterfly knife, fan knife or Batangas knife, is a type of folding pocketknife that originated from the Philippines. Its distinct features are two handles counter-rotating around the tang such that, when closed, the blade is concealed within grooves in the handles. A latch sometimes holds the handles together, typically mounted on the one facing the cutting edge (the "bite handle").

The balisong was commonly used by Filipinos, especially those in the Tagalog region, as self-defense and a pocket utility knife. Hollow-grind balisongs were also used as straight razors before conventional razors were made available in the Philippines. In the hands of a trained user, the knife blade can be brought out to bear quickly using one hand. Manipulations, called "flipping", are performed for art or amusement. Blunt "trainer" versions of these knives are also available and can be used to practice tricks without the risk of injury.

The knife is either illegal, or the length of the blade is restricted in some countries. Often restricted under the same laws and reasons as switchblades or concealed weapons, additionally having restrictions in some countries due to the balisong being classified as a gravity knife. Within the Philippines, it is no longer as common in urban areas as in the past.

== Name ==
Names for the knives in English include "fan knives" and "butterfly knives" from the motion, and "click clacks" from the sound they make when they are opened and closed.

The name "balisong" is derived from barangay (village) Balisong, part of the municipality of Taal, Batangas province, which along with the neighboring barangay Pandayan (now part of Poblacion zones 6, 9, and 10 of Taal town proper), were the original manufacturing centers of the knives in the Philippines. The two barangays were home to a blacksmith industry that also produced other bladed implements such as bolo knives. It is also dubiously claimed that the meaning of the term balisong is derived from the Tagalog words baling sungay (literally, "broken horn") as the hilt of the blade was supposedly traditionally made from carved carabao and deer horn, as well as bones, but the mass production of the knife ever since the early 20th century already used metal. The traditional balisong is also known as veinte y nueve or "twenty-nine" in the Philippines because they are 29 cm (11 in) long when opened.

An exceptionally large balisong is called a balisword. The term "balisword" is a portmanteau of the words "balisong" and "sword". The standard length of an open sword is around 37 inches (94 cm). A normal blade measures around 17 inches (43 cm) long, with a set of folding hilts about 20 inches (51 cm) long. Baliswords can reach from 2 ft (0.61 m) to over 6 ft (1.8 m) in length.

== History ==
The origin of the knives is unclear. Mass production of the balisong in the Philippines can only be attested to the early 1900s. It is speculated that the balisong was originally an adaptation of a French measuring tool called the pied du roi ("foot of the king"), invented between the 1500s to the late 1760s. However, how it was introduced to the Philippines is unknown. There are theories that it may have been introduced by sailors in the Spanish Empire, which was then allied with France.

Regardless of origin, the modern balisong was perfected in the Philippines, where it became much larger and was predominantly used as a weapon, not just a tool. The quick opening techniques ("flipping") were also developed in the Philippines. In contrast, the French pied du roi was primarily a folding ruler, with the knife only included in some specimens as a novelty. They were cumbersome to open and unlikely to be used for self-defense, especially since they also commonly included a metal tang at a right angle from the end of the handle to aid in measuring. There were also very similar designs to the balisong produced in England in the late 19th century, presumably also derived from the pied du roi. But like the latter, they were primarily utilitarian tools.

== Construction ==
There are two main types of balisong construction: "sandwich construction" and "channel construction".

Sandwich-constructed balisong knives are assembled in layers that are generally pinned or screwed together. They allow the pivot pins to be adjusted more tightly without binding. When the knife is closed, the blade rests between the layers.

For a channel-constructed balisong, the main part of each handle is formed from one piece of material. In this handle, a groove is created (either by folding, milling, or being integrally cast) in which the blade rests when the knife is closed. This style is regarded as being stronger than sandwich construction.

A version known as faux-channel construction also exists, where the handles are sandwiched between channel spacers that mimic the feel of a channel handle while being customizable with different types of spacers. Another variation is speed-channel construction, where a hole is milled out on the outside groove of the handle to support flow while flipping.

Sometimes, the handles can be made smaller in width to support a scales/liners system. Scales are the main handle construction in either the sandwich construction or the channel construction. Liners are the outside cover to make the full-sized handle. These liners are commonly made from G10 fiberglass or carbon fiber.

Additionally, the two main construction types can be combined to form a "chanwich construction", a portmanteau of "channel" and "sandwich", which involves two halves of a channel handle screwed together. The chanwich construction can be divided into 2 types: standard chanwich and speed chanwich. Although rare, this construction generally keeps the best elements of both constructions and discards the worst, as it retains the better handle shape channel construction is known for, while still allowing adjustment of the tightness the handles are held together to some extent, as well as easier access to the inside of the handle for cleaning.

There are also three types of pivots systems that balisongs use: bearings, bushings, or washers-only.

Bearing-operated balisongs have small ball bearings housed in a circular concavity around the hole in the pivot. These bearings allow the handles of the balisong to rotate.

Bushing-operated balisongs have a small metal bushing slightly thicker than the tang in each pivot hole, with a usually bronze disc known as a washer on each side. These washers clamp down on the bushing, but not on the tang, when the pivot screw is tightened, allowing the handle to rotate around the tang.

There are also washer-only operated balisongs, which are usually much cheaper and lower quality than the other kinds, as they don't need bushings, but the handles will always bind to the tang when the screws are tightened enough, and the washers, tang and handles all wear themselves down much faster due to the increased friction.

Some of the blades of traditional butterfly knives in the Philippines were made from steel taken from railroad tracks, thus giving them a decent amount of durability and toughness, while others are made from recycled leaf springs of vehicles.

There are 2 types of pin systems: tang pins, small pins on the tang of the blade that space the handles, preventing them from hitting too hard, stopping blade wobble, and engaging the latch; and zen pins, which are two small pins embedded in the top of the handles of the balisong that make contact with the bottom of the blade. In certain knives the zen pins are hidden, embedded into the handle construction. While a balisong with zen pins is easier for the end user to perform maintenance on and significantly easier to design, they do not hold up as long as tang pins would in a properly made knife. The force of the harder blade contacting the soft zen pins will mean they need to be replaced far more often than tang pins, which should be mild steel, so the blade doesn't crack and can cushion against soft handle materials rather than crush each other.

Some modern balisongs also have a "pinless" system, in which they do not have any pins, and instead rely on the material of the handles to make contact with the blade, similar to how zen pins work. The longevity of the pinless is exceedingly short and not meant for long-term usage before the system itself fails and the knife breaks.

== Parts ==
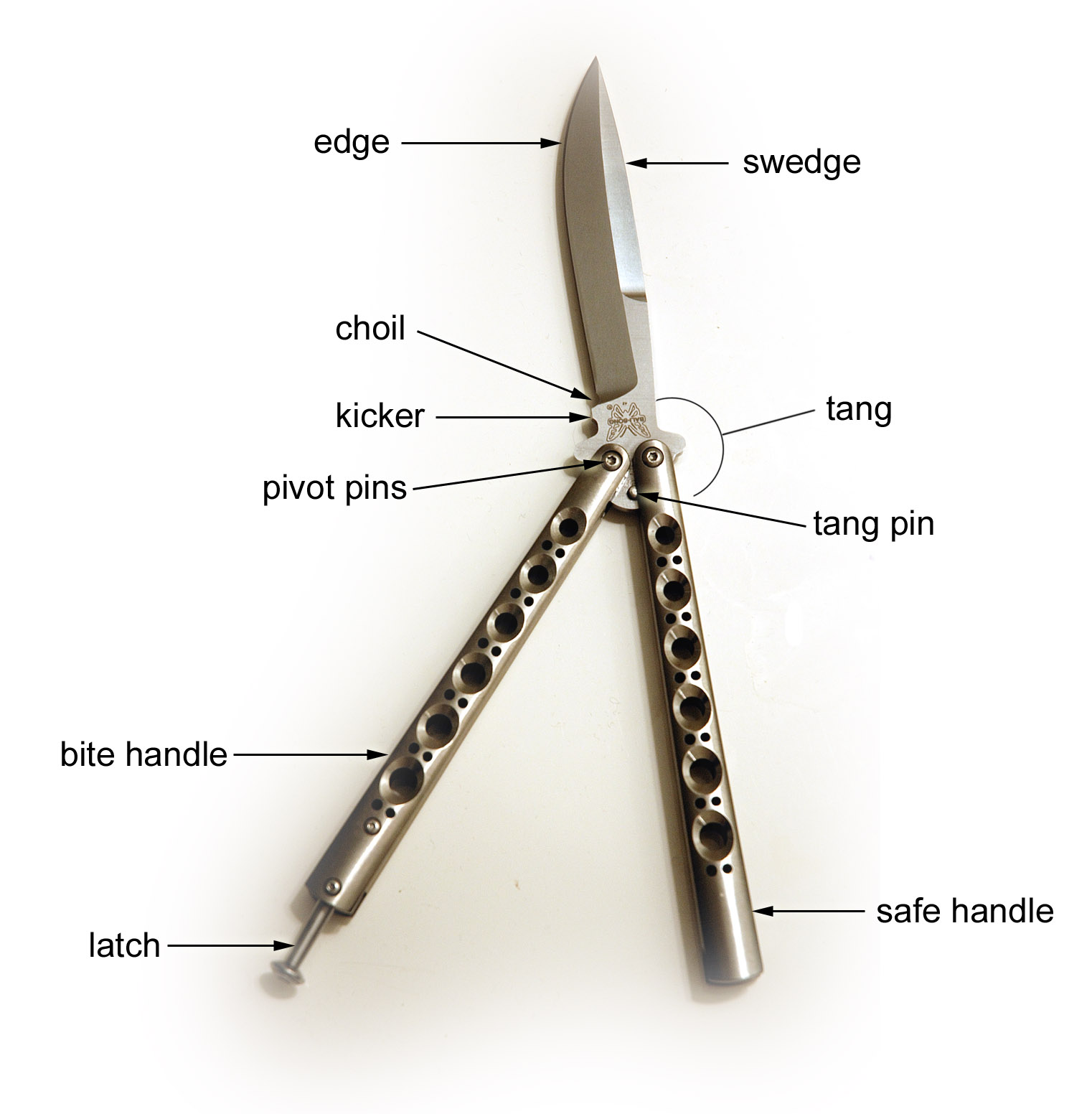
Parts of a Benchmade 42

A balisong being opened and closed

Bite handle
The handle that closes on the sharp edge of the blade, and will cut the user if they are holding that handle when the knife closes. This handle usually carries the latch.
Choil
The unsharpened portion of the blade just above the kicker, which makes it easier to sharpen the blade.
Jimping
Grooves at the near ends of the handles to support certain tricks (Ladder tricks or the Choker Fan trick) and provide comfort while flipping.
Kicker (or Kick)
Area on the blade that prevents the sharp edge from touching the inside of the handle and suffering damage. This is sometimes supplanted by an additional tang pin above the pivots.
Latch
The standard locking system, which holds the knife closed. Magnets are occasionally used instead.
Latch, Batangas
A latch that is attached to the bite handle.
Latch, Manila
A latch that is attached to the safe handle.
Latch, Spring
A latch that utilizes a spring to propel the latch open when the handles are squeezed.
Latch gate
A block inside the channel of the handles, stopping the latch from impacting the blade.
Pivot joint
A pin about which the Tang/Blade/Handle assemblies pivot.
Safe handle
The handle (generally the handle without the latch) that closes on the non-sharpened edge of the blade.
Swedge
Unsharpened spine of the blade. Some balisongs are also sharpened here or on both sides with either a more traditional look or wavy edges similar to a Kris sword.
Tang
The base of the blade where the handles are attached with pivot pins.
Tang Pin(s)
Pin meant to hold the blade away from the handle when closed to prevent dulling; and, in some cases, a second pin to keep the handles from excessively banging together while the butterfly knife is being manipulated.
Zen Pins
Screws mounted inside the handles that collide with the kicker mounted on the tang to prevent the blade from moving around while in the open or closed position.
Blade
The blade is a piece of steel that runs down the center of the knife, secured by both handles when closed. One edge of the blade is sharp and will cut the user if they are not careful, especially when flipping the knife. The other side is called the spine and can have what is known as a swedge. The swedge is a blunt bevel ground in for looks and won't cut the user. The spine commonly impacts the user's hand when flipping. Some knives will have a dual-edge blade, with both sides of the blade having a sharpened edge. Some models that uses the dual-edge blade include: Benchmade 49, Krake Raken Zenith (Squid Industries), or the Kris Talisong (Eldon Talley - Flytanium)

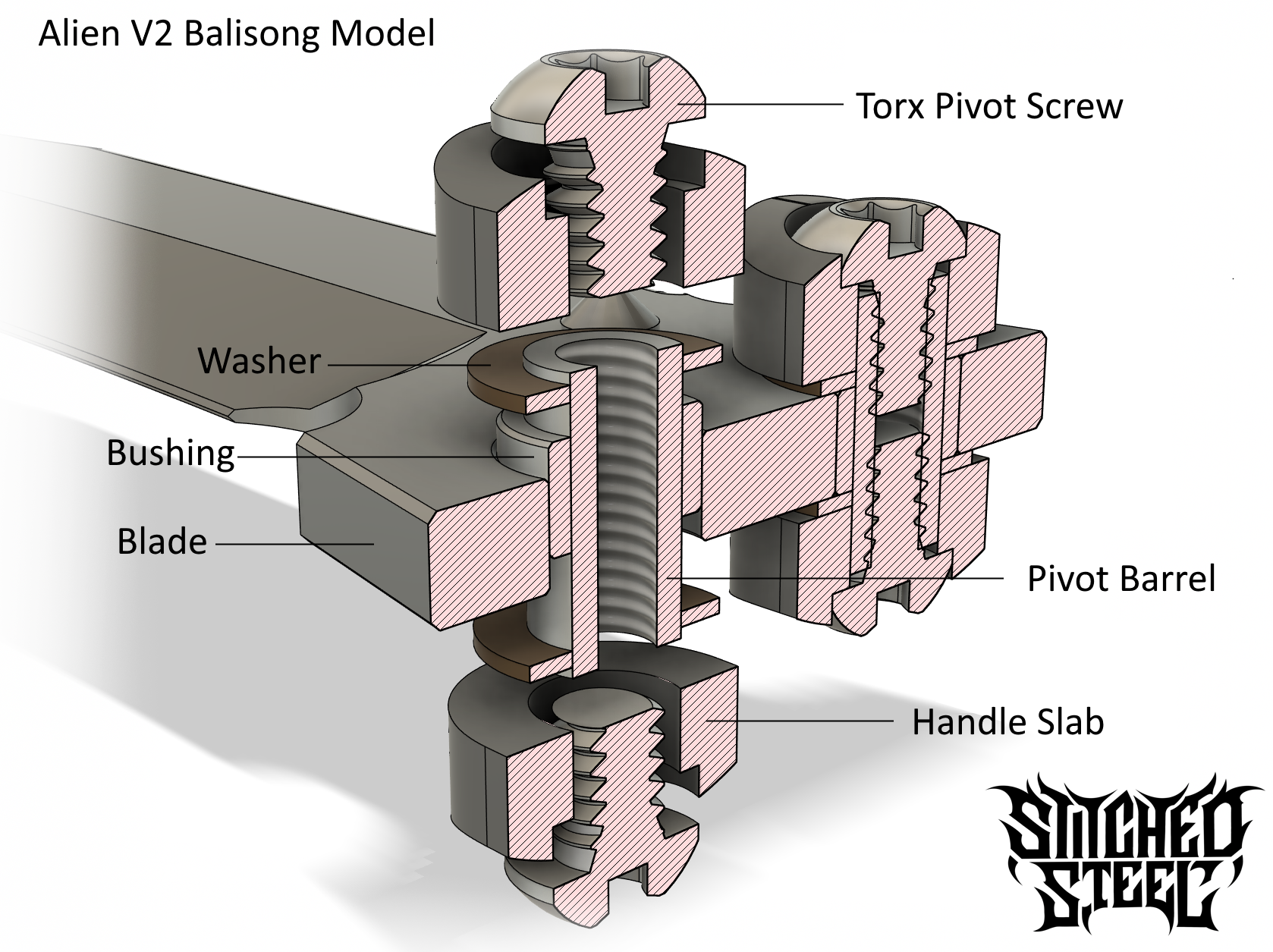
Exploded bushing construction in a modern balisong

Bushing
A small barrel of steel included in the blade so the handles can be tightened without back and forth movement. The bushing is a highly precise element of modern balisong knives and requires specialized tuning to function properly.

== Legal status ==
The balisong has been outlawed in several countries, mainly due to its easy utility in crimes and its ability to be easily concealed for the same purpose. In some jurisdictions, its criminal use is considered a knife crime.

- In Australia, balisongs are generally classified as a prohibited weapon, which requires a special, legitimate excuse to possess them. Australia defines balisongs as a flick knife (or other similar device) that has a blade which opens automatically by gravity or centrifugal acceleration or by any pressure applied to a button, spring, or device in or attached to the handle of the knife.
- In Belgium, butterfly knives are illegal.
- In Canada, although not specified by name as a prohibited weapon, the balisong knife is often considered by courts to fall under the gravity knife or centrifugal classification and is therefore prohibited, unless grandfathered in before prohibition.
- In the Czech Republic, balisongs, switchblades, and gravity knives are treated like normal knives.
- In Denmark, butterfly knives are illegal.
- In Finland, balisongs are legal to be purchased, sold, and possessed, and are treated just like regular knives and fall under the edged weapons law. Carrying one in public is permitted if the person carrying one can prove it is used as a tool.
- In France, balisongs are legal to own if one is over 18 years of age, but are illegal to carry without official authorization.
- In Germany, the balisong was outlawed when the Waffengesetz (weapons law) was tightened in April 2003 in the aftermath of the Erfurt massacre. Thus, buying, possessing, lending, using, carrying, crafting, altering, and trading it is illegal and is punishable by up to five years imprisonment, confiscation of the knife, and a fine of up to €10,000. Using a butterfly knife for a crime of any kind – as is any illegal weapon – is punishable by from 1 to 10 years imprisonment.
- In Hungary, balisongs, switchblades, and gravity knives are treated like normal knives. They are legal to possess one regardless of its length, but it is illegal to carry one that is longer than 8 cm (3.1 in) in public.
- In Ireland, butterfly knives are illegal offensive weapons.
- In Italy, balisongs are legal to own if not sharpened on both sides, but illegal to carry without justifiable reason.
- In Lithuania, balisongs, among other knives, are legal to possess and carry as they are not considered weapons. This excludes switchblades.
- In the Netherlands, balisongs are illegal.
- In New Zealand, balisongs are illegal.
- In Norway, balisongs are illegal.
- In the Philippines, it is now generally illegal to carry one without identification or a proper permit in the streets of the capital because of their prevalent use in crime and altercations. One now needs to demonstrate the need for a professional livelihood or utilitarian purpose (such as cutting grass, preparing fruit and meat, being a vendor of knives, being martial arts instructors, etc.) to be able to walk around with bladed implements in the urban areas. Another rule of thumb is that the blade of pocketknives must not exceed the length of the palm and must not be openable by one hand to be considered as a utility knife, as opposed to a weapon (thus, Swiss Army Knives, are legal).
- In Poland, balisongs, switchblades, and gravity knives are treated like normal knives.
- In Russia, balisongs are legal only if the length of the blade is not more than 90 mm (3.5 in).
- In Sweden, balisongs are illegal to carry, import, or trade, but legal to own and collect.
- In Switzerland, balisongs are illegal to carry, give, lend, buy, or trade.
- In the United Kingdom, the balisong has been legally classified as an offensive weapon since January 1989. Carrying one in public is an offence under the Prevention of Crime Act 1953. Sale, lending, hiring, giving, or importing is prohibited by the Criminal Justice Act 1988, as amended by the Offensive Weapons Act 1996. Any imported goods are liable to be seized, and prosecution may follow. An exception is made for knives of this type over 100 years old, which are classed as antiques.
- In some parts of the United States, it is illegal to possess or carry such a knife in public. In certain jurisdictions, balisongs are categorized as gravity knives, switchblades, or daggers.
  - In California, balisong/switchblade knives are legal to own, buy, sell, and transport if the length of the blade is not more than 2 inches (51 mm). If the length of the blade is more than 2 inches (51 mm) they are illegal to buy, sell, transfer, or possess in public, although it is legal to possess one if kept at home (Penal Code section 17235 & 21510).
  - In Florida, butterfly knives are legal, as Florida defines butterfly knives as a type of folding knife. However, butterfly knives are subject to the same concealed carry licensing requirements as all other folding knives with blades longer than four inches.
  - In Hawaii, it was illegal to possess, manufacture, sell, transfer, or transport any balisong/butterfly-type knife until the 9th Circuit Court of Appeals overturned the ban in August 2023.
  - In Kansas, there were once legal restrictions on butterfly knives; however, as of July 2013, the Kansas Comprehensive Knife Rights Act decriminalized the carrying of all types of bladed weapons.
  - In Illinois, it is legal to own and carry a butterfly knife.
    - In Chicago, it is illegal to carry a concealed knife with a blade longer than 2.5 inches (64 mm). Automatic (switchblade) knives and gravity knives are prohibited, as carrying a concealed double-edged knife.
  - In Indiana, it is legal to own and carry a butterfly knife both concealed and open.
  - In Kentucky, the balisong is legal for concealed and open carrying anywhere one is not otherwise prohibited from carrying a concealed deadly weapon. Kentucky's constitution and revised statutes prohibit cities and counties from enacting weapons laws and restrictions.
  - In Maine, it is legal to own, sell, and carry.
  - In Massachusetts, the balisong is legal for concealed and open carrying so long as it does not "[present] an objective threat of danger to a person of reasonable and average sensibility." Restrictions also apply depending on the area of the person carrying the knife (such as within a public school).
  - In Michigan, the balisong is legal because it is classified as a folding knife.
  - In New Jersey, balisongs are illegal (NJSA 2C:39-1), but the question of legality or illegality is open.
  - In New Mexico, possession of a butterfly knife is illegal because the butterfly knife is a switchblade within the meaning of the statute, making possession of switchblades unlawful.
  - In New York, the balisong has been determined not to be a gravity knife, and therefore not prohibited under the Penal Law [see: People v. Zuniga, 303 A.D.2d 773 (2nd Dept. 2003)] However, the law prohibiting gravity knives was found to be unconstitutional and their possession was decriminalized in 2019.
  - In North Carolina, citizens are allowed to carry most pocketknives most of the time. Statute S.14-269, which prohibits the concealed carrying of any "bowie knife, dirk, dagger", or "other deadly weapon of like kind" doesn't apply to an "ordinary pocketknife carried in a closed position".
  - In North Dakota, it is legal to own a balisong and carry it openly. However, they are illegal to carry concealed, as they are considered to be deadly weapon.
  - In Ohio, it is legal to possess a balisong and carry it either openly or concealed, provided the knife is not actively used as a deadly weapon, following the enactment of Senate Bill 140 in 2021.
  - In Oklahoma, the balisong is legal for open carry but is illegal to carry concealed.
  - In Oregon, it is illegal to carry a concealed balisong.
  - In Tennessee, there are no restrictions on carrying a balisong and similar knives, whether open or concealed carrying. Restrictions on these instead focuses on intent rather than merely carrying.
  - In Texas, switchblades are legal as of 1 September 2013.
  - In Utah, balisongs are legal to own and carry as long as you are not a "Restricted Person" as described in Utah State Code §76-10-503.
  - In Virginia, the balisong is legal for concealed and open carrying according to state law.
  - In Washington, the balisong is classified as a spring blade knife, and under state law, one cannot manufacture, sell, dispose of, or possess such knives.

Balisong trainers feature a special blunt and unsharpened "blade" and are legal in some areas where balisongs are not.

== See also ==
- Arnis
- Fighting knife
- Filipino martial arts
- Hackman (company)
- Jacob's ladder (knife)
- Knife fight
- Pantographic knife
- Pocketknife
