= Katar =

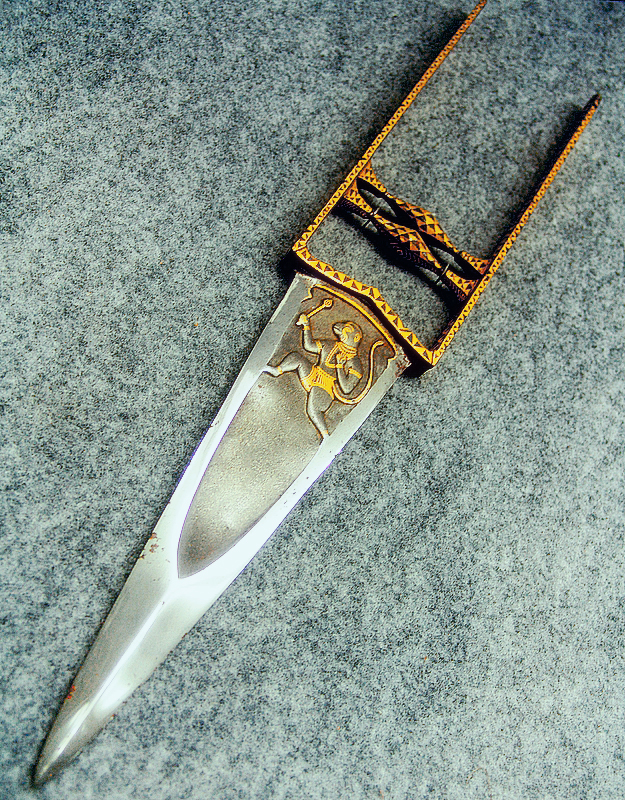
- Ornamented katar
- Type: Push dagger
- Place of origin: South India, Indian subcontinent

Specifications
- Hilt type: Horizontal

The katar is a type of push dagger from the Indian subcontinent. The weapon is characterised by its H-shaped horizontal hand grip which results in the blade sitting above the user's knuckles. Unique to the Indian subcontinent, it is the most famous and characteristic of Indian daggers. Ceremonial katars were also used in worship.

== Etymology ==
Having originated in South India, the weapon's earliest name-form was likely the Tamil kaṭṭāri (கட்டாரி). It is alternatively known in Tamil as kuttuvāḷ (குத்துவாள்) which means "stabbing blade". This was adapted into Sanskrit as kaṭār (कट्टार) or kaṭārī. The name however is of Indo-Aryan origin, which means Tamil loaned the word from them.

Other regional names for the weapon include kaṭhāri (ಕಠಾರಿ) in Kannada, kathari (కఠారి) in Telugu, kaṭāra (കട്ടാര) in Malayalam, kaṭyāra (कट्यार) in Marathi, kāṭār, (ਕਟਾਰ) in Panjabi, kaṭārī (କଟାରି) in Odia and kirat Dewan language|(chhuiket) in Nepal kaṭāra (कटार) or kaṭāri in Hindi.

== History ==
The katar was created in Southern India, its earliest forms being closely associated with the 14th-century Vijayanagara Empire. It may have originated with the mustika, a method of holding a dagger between the middle and index finger still used in Kalaripayattu and Gatka today. The real name of this is "Kidaari" from the ancient Tamil warfare class of weapons. Kidaari derived from the term "Kedayam Ari" meaning the "Shield Splitter" in Tamil. The name indicates this weapon being used to break shields and armor. The weapon was used by many ethnic Tamil infantry units aka "Kaalatpadai". This falls under the "mushtikai" class of Indian weapon system. "Mushti" means the fingers closed and "kai" means arm.

A Tamil king would be gifted with a golden Kidari as a token of loyalty from the Kaalatpadai General. It was worn as a symbol of respect by the king to the soldiers who lay down their lives for him in war without any hesitation. Later Chhatrpati Shivaji Maharaj was gifted with a Kidaari during his conquest to Tamil Nadu. A specific type of dagger might have been designed for this, as maustika is described vaguely as a "fist dagger" in the arsenal list of Abu'l-Fazl ibn Mubarak. One of the most famous groups of early katar come from the Thanjavur Nayak kingdom of the 17th century. Katar dating back to this period often had a leaf- or shell-like knucklebow curving up from the top of the blade to protect the back of the hand. This form is today sometimes called a "hooded katara" but the knuckleguard was discarded altogether by the later half of the 17th century. As the weapon spread throughout the region it became something of a status symbol, much like the Southeast Asian kris or the Japanese katana. Princes and nobles were often portrayed wearing a katar at their side. This was not only a precaution for self-defense, but also meant to show their wealth and position. Mughal nobility would even hunt tigers with a katar.

Some modern katar designs may include single-shot pistols built into either side of the weapon. In the 18th century, some traditional katar were refurbished with this innovation. The katar ceased to be in common use by the 19th century, though they were still forged for decorative purposes. During the 18th and 19th century, a distinctive group of katar were produced at Bundi in Rajasthan. They were ornately crafted and their hilts were covered in gold foil. These katar were shown at the Great Exhibition of 1851 in Crystal Palace, London. Since then, the weapon has sometimes been mistakenly referred to in English as a "Bundi dagger".

== Appearance ==
The basic katar has a short, wide, triangular blade. Its peculiarity lies in the handle which is made up of two parallel bars connected by two or more cross-pieces, one of which is at the end of the side bars and is fastened to the blade. The remainder forms the handle which is at right angle to the blade. Some handles have long arms extending across the length of the user's forearm. The handle is generally of all-steel construction and may be gilded or otherwise decorated.

The blade, typically measuring 30–90 cm (12–35 in) in length, is usually cut with a number of fullers. Most katar have straight blades, but in south India they are commonly wavy. South Indian blades are often made broad at the hilt and taper in straight lines to the point, and elaborately ribbed by grooves parallel to the edges. Occasionally the blades are slightly curved. Some blades are forked into two points, and one decorative variation includes a hollow outer blade which hinges open to expose a smaller blade inside.

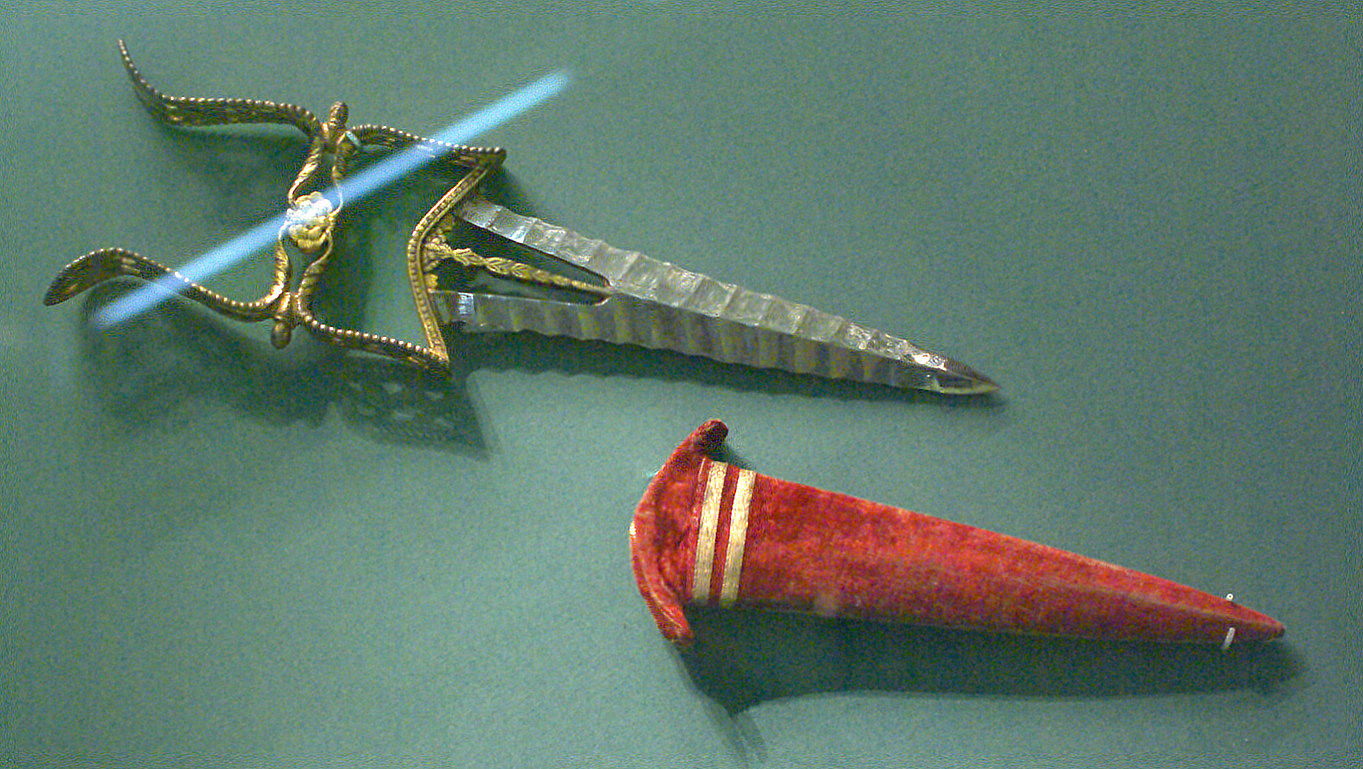
Katar and sheath

The Indian nobility often wore ornamental katar as a symbol of their social status. The hilts may be covered in enamel, gems, or gold foil. Similarly, figures and scenes were chiselled onto the blade. Sheaths, generally made from watered steel, were sometimes pierced with decorative designs. The heat and moisture of India's climate made steel an unsuitable material for a dagger sheath, so they were covered in fabric such as velvet or silk. Some katar served as a sheath to fit one or two smaller ones inside.

== Techniques ==
Because the katar's blade is in line with the user's arm, the basic attack is a direct thrust identical to a punch, although it could also be used for slashing. This design allows the fighter to put their whole weight into a thrust. The sides of the handle could be used for blocking but it otherwise has little defensive capability. As far back as the 16th century, there was at least one fighting style which focused on fighting with a pair of katar, one in each hand.

== See also ==
- Pata (sword)
- Push dagger
