= Jacob's ladder (knife) =

Type of three-part pocket knife

The "Jacob's ladder" is a type of pocketknife consisting of two handle segments joined by a pivot, with a blade connected by a second pivot to the end of one handle segment.

The design presumably takes its name from the multi-jointed wooden toy also known as a Jacob's ladder, which is itself named after the ladder to heaven witnessed by the biblical patriarch Jacob (Genesis 28:12).

== Design ==
It is conceptually similar to the butterfly knife (balisong) in that it has no mechanical lock or spring pressure, but is kept in the open position during use by the leverage imparted by the user's hand.

== History ==
This type of knife was out of production for decades, but was revived in the 1990s by two manufacturers: Fred Perrin (both made by himself and those outsourced) and Cold Steel.
