= Push dagger =

Weapon

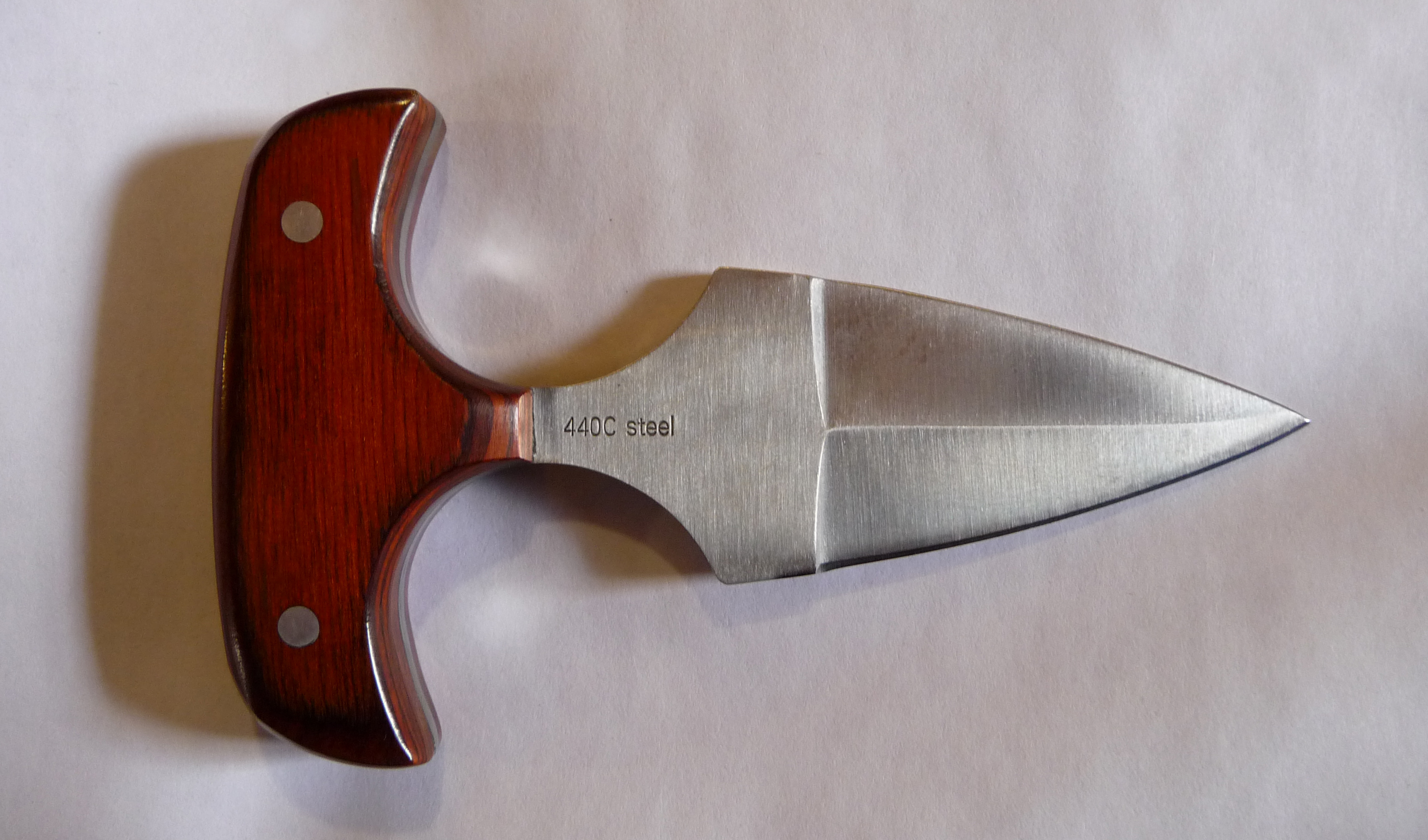

A push dagger (alternately known as a punch dagger, punch knife, push knife or, less often, a push dirk) is a short-bladed dagger with a "T"-shaped handle, designed to be grasped and held in a closed-fist hand, so that the blade protrudes from the front of the fist; either between the index and middle fingers, or between the two central fingers, when the grip and blade are symmetrical.

It originated as a close-combat weapon for civilians in the early 19th century, and also saw some use in the trench warfare of World War I.

== History ==
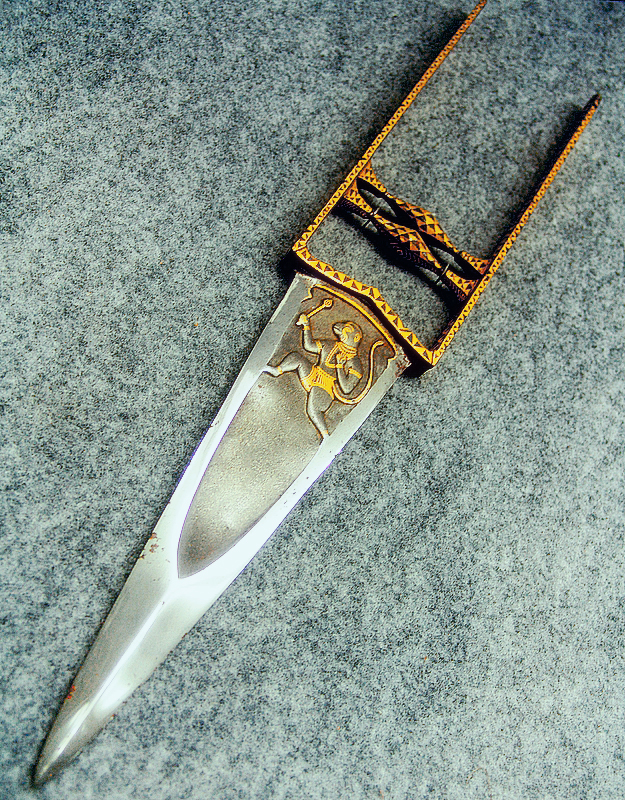
Indian katar

The 16th-century Indian katar (कटार), or punching sword, has been compared to the push dagger. This weapon is analogous, or a remote predecessor at best, as the katar is gripped by two close-set vertical bars, while a push dagger uses a T-handle and a blade that protrudes between the fingers when properly gripped.

=== American push dagger ===
The push dagger originates in the 19th-century Southern United States. Politicians wore them into state and federal buildings, even the United States Capitol. As a concealable weapon, the push dagger was a favorite choice of civilian owners requiring a discreet knife capable of being used for personal protection. Before the development of reliable small pistols such as the derringer, the push dagger was especially popular among riverboat gamblers and residents of the larger towns and cities of the Old Southwest, particularly gamblers and émigrés from the city of New Orleans, Louisiana.

The New Orleans-style push dagger was known as the gimlet knife. The gimlet knife had a short two-inch (50 mm) blade with a "gimlet" or T-handle. It was a common weapon in the city during the 1800s and was usually slipped into a boot or concealed inside a coat sleeve or hung on a waistcoat button by a strap attached to the knife's leather sheath. The gimlet knife was used in so many riots, fights, and murders in New Orleans that the city passed an ordinance in 1879 prohibiting anyone within city limits from selling, offering or exhibiting such a weapon for sale.

The push dagger also was a favorite weapon in 19th-century San Francisco, California. The San Francisco style of push dagger tended to have a slightly longer blade than the gimlet knife and was most often equipped with a T-handle made of walrus ivory.

=== Stoßdolch ===
During the latter half of the 19th century, the push dagger also enjoyed a brief period of popularity in Britain and Central Europe, particularly in Germany, where it was called the Stoßdolch or Faustmesser, meaning "push-dagger" and "fist-knife", respectively. The weapon was introduced there in the mid-1800s by foreign sailors visiting North German ports. German cutlery makers began manufacturing domestic versions of the design, often set in nickel-silver mountings. The Stoßdolch was sold primarily as a self-defense weapon for travelers, salesmen, and others who required a compact, concealable weapon. Push daggers continued to be sold in Britain and Europe through the end of the 19th century, when the combination of more effective police forces and the availability of inexpensive small handguns caused a substantial decline in sales and usage of push daggers and other types of specialized fighting knives.

=== World War I ===
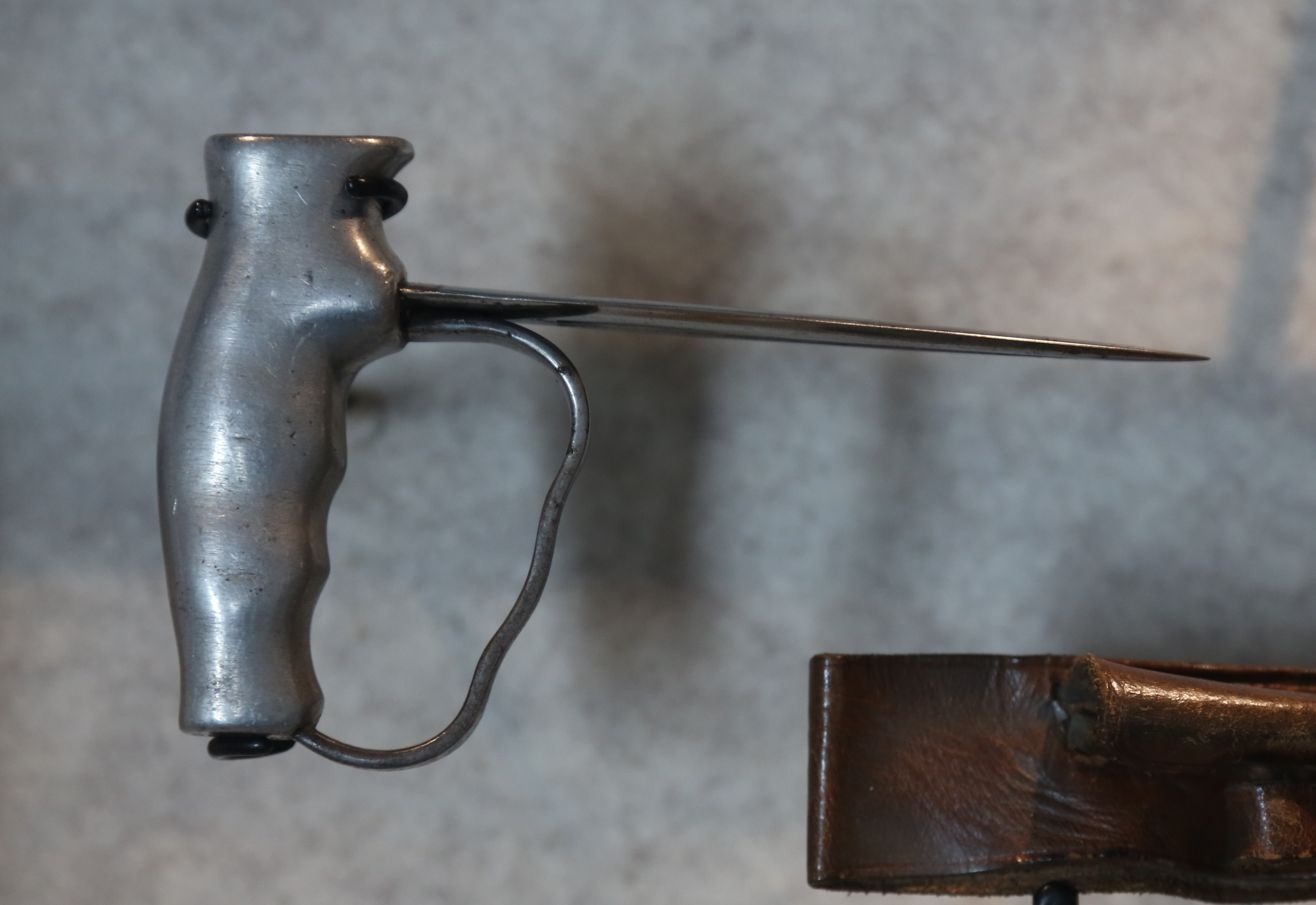
A Dudley push dagger

The reality of static trench warfare in World War I created a need for short, handy close-combat weapons that could be used in the confines of a trench. With pistols in short supply, a variety of knives and other stabbing weapons were created or issued to troops serving in the trenches. Most of these weapons were originally fabricated in the field from readily available materials such as metal stakes. Still, soon factory-made examples of knuckle knives and push daggers appeared at the front and were used by both sides in the war. In Britain, the Robbins-Dudley Co. of Dudley, Worcestershire, a metalworking company, was one of the first commercial producers of specialized wartime knuckle-knives and push daggers for private sale to individual soldiers and officers. The typical Robbins-Dudley push dagger – referred to as a 'punch knife' by its maker – utilized an aluminium "knuckle"-type handle cast onto a 3.625-inch (92.1 mm) heat-treated steel dagger blade or a 5-inch (130 mm) metal spike, which was subsequently blackened to prevent reflections in moonlight.

=== World War II ===
The push dagger re-emerged during World War II, where it was first issued as combat weapon for British commandos, SAS, SOE, and other specialized raiding or guerrilla forces requiring a compact and concealable weapon for sentry elimination or close-quarters fighting.

=== Contemporary designs ===
During the 1980s, several new versions of the push dagger concept were produced by various specialty cutlery manufacturers and sold primarily as "tactical" or self-defense weapons, particularly in the U.S.

== Legality ==
The sale and possession (or possession in public) of a push dagger with blade perpendicular to the handle is prohibited in some countries, such as the United Kingdom, Ireland, and Canada. However, if the edge is parallel to the handle, it is legal. The laws of many countries and several U.S. states and cities prohibit or criminalize to some degree the purchase, possession, or sale of push daggers or knuckle knives.

== See also ==
- Katar (dagger)
- Knife legislation
- List of daggers
- Mark I trench knife
- Ulu
