= Gravity knife =

Knife that opens its blade by the force of gravity

A gravity knife is a knife with a blade contained in its handle, which opens its blade through the force of gravity. This mechanism of opening is fundamentally different from the switchblade, which extends its spring-propelled blade automatically upon the push of a button, switch, or fulcrum lever. The main purpose of gravity opening is to allow opening and closing to be done with one hand, in situations where the other is occupied. Hence, historically, parachutists have been issued them to cut off caught lines, such as lines tangled in trees, a major potential use of the gravity knife.

The gravity knife uses a button, trigger, or fulcrum lever to release the blade from both the open and the closed positions, and may use a side-folding or telescoping (out-the-front, or OTF) blade. While most military gravity knives utilize a locking blade design, other types may not mechanically lock open but rely instead upon friction to wedge the blade's rear section against the handle's interior. Factory-made gravity knives have various types of buttons, triggers, and fulcrum levers, which usually are used to release the blade from both the open and the closed positions.

== Design and operation ==
=== Flieger-Kappmesser / Luftwaffe Gravity Knife (LGK) ===
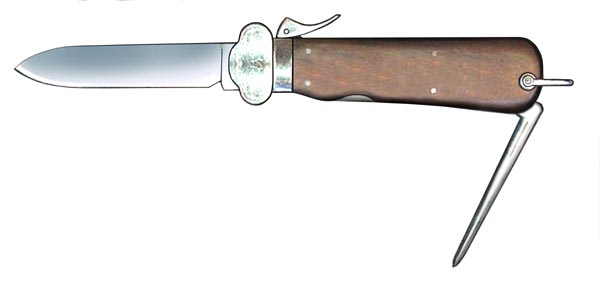
German Luftwaffe Fallschirmjäger-Messer or air force paratrooper knife

One of the most recognizable gravity knives is the World War II-era Flieger-Kappmesser (lit. 'flyer's cutting knife'), which utilizes a 4 in (10 cm) telescoping (OTF), gravity-propelled locking blade. First produced in 1937, the often so called Fallschirmjägermesser (lit. 'paratrooper knife') was initially issued to German flight crews and paratroops, primarily to cut a trapped parachutist from his rigging in case he landed with a tangled parachute, or became entangled in trees or in the water with the shroud lines. The spike was used to untie knots while packing the parachutes. Luftwaffe air crew members used the knife to cut themselves out of their harnesses or cut through the aluminum hull of the aircraft after a crash landing. Though not intended for use as a fighting knife in the first place, the LGK was introduced to the 1st Skijäger Division and SS units on the Eastern Front to be used primarily as a close combat weapon from 1944 on.

The Flieger-Kappmesser uses a sliding blade inside a metal grip frame, which was initially fitted with smooth wood scales. The blade is relatively blunt spear-point, and the profile is flat ground, tapering to a utility edge. To open the blade, the user points the knife downwards while flipping up the fulcrum-style operating lever, allowing gravity to draw out the blade to its fullest extent. Releasing the lever locks the blade into position. The LGK may also be opened by flipping the blade release lever while flicking the wrist holding the knife, causing the blade to extend. The LGK was also equipped with a folding marlinspike or awl. Primarily intended for untangling rope knots, it was also used as a prying tool or to fix jammed weapons. The spike does not lock when opened and was never intended to be used as a combat weapon.

There are two principal types of wartime-era Flieger-Kappmesser with 10 known variations. The Type I LGK (three manufacturers, five WWII variations) has wood scales (handle), was made from 1937 to 1943, and, unlike successive models, has no takedown capability. The Type II LGK (two manufacturers, five WWII variations) is the same knife, but with takedown features, and was produced from 1943 until 1945 and then again from c. 1950 until 1965.

After the end of World War II, the newly organized West German Bundeswehr placed new orders with German cutlery manufacturers for a postwar version of the Kappmesser for issue to the Army's airborne forces and tank crews. The West German Luftwaffe abandoned the gravity knife concept completely and purchased different rescue knives, including a shroud line cutter. The initial Type III "trap door" gravity knife, made from 1955 to 1961, was unreliable. Thus, the original WWII Type II design was reintroduced until the early Type IV knives finally replaced it in 1968. The Type IV LGK is similar to the WWII-production Type II takedown knife but features plastic polymer instead of wooden scales. It was made by WMF, OFW, and Eickhorn from 1972 to 1984. They were issued to Bundeswehr soldiers until 2017. The third West German post-war model is the Type V LGK, initially named AES79 and still today produced under the designation LL80 (1979–present) by Eickhorn. The LL80 is smaller, has fewer parts, and is more cost-effective than earlier Flieger-Kappmesser. It was procured by the Swiss Air Force and issued to their Dassault Mirage pilots in 1983. These knives are marked AES83 and bear the number of the aircraft on the metal head.

On the other side of the Iron Curtain, in the German Democratic Republic, WWII gravity knives were refurbished and re-issued to the paratroopers and pilots until the existing stock was gone. In the early 1960s, two companies produced an East German version of the Type I knives. They were then used until the early 1970s.

=== Ibberson gravity knife ===
After British forces had captured numbers of Type I Flieger-Kappmesser, the British government approached George Ibberson & Co. of Sheffield, England, a knife and cutlery manufacturer, and requested production of a British version of the German Luftwaffe Gravity Knife for the Special Operations Executive (SOE) and other clandestine warfare units. Under the initial wartime contract, George Ibberson & Co. made 500 gravity knives for issue to the SOE and other special forces. These Sheffield gravity knives had smooth wood or textured plastic scales. Still, they were otherwise identical in features and operation to the Type I Flieger-Kappmesser, with a locking gravity-deployed blade and a folding rigging spike or awl. In the hands of British SOE agents, the Sheffield gravity knife was considered to be a secondary combat weapon. In addition to the knife blade, SOE close combat instructors found that the folding rigging spike was useful for silent killing of sentries by opening the carotid artery on the neck.

=== 'False gravity' and non-gravity knives ===
Some folding or telescoping knives that can open their blades by force of inertia or gravity were not intended or advertised by the manufacturer to do so. Knives that will lock their blades open, but do not have any closed position lock device, are referred to as "false" gravity blades.

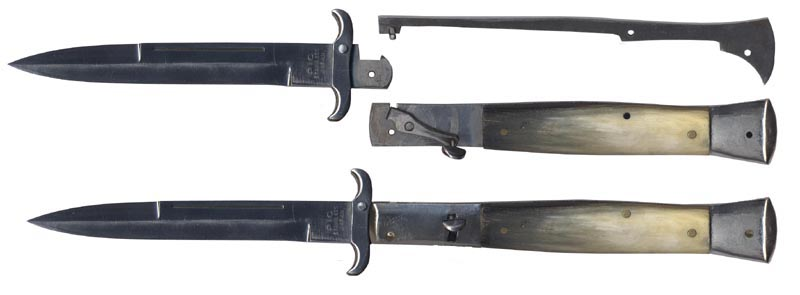
Folding "false" gravity knife

The illustration shows the internal parts of a 1960s Japanese import 'false' gravity knife. Other knives may be considered 'false' gravity knives, including certain lock-back and liner lock folding knives that will not lock a blade in both open and closed positions.

After the passage of the Switchblade Knife Act in the U.S. in 1958, it was discovered that some U.S. businesses were importing folding stiletto knives without spring mechanisms that did not have a pronounced blade heel (internal surface) in the pivot area allowing the longer 11 and 13 in (28 and 33 cm) bladed models to flick open quickly. Modern (post 1965) folding stilettos imported or distributed in the U.S. now have blade heels that are intentionally pointed and ratchet against the lockback mechanism, preventing inertia opening.

Other knives commonly mistaken for gravity knives include the automatic OTF knife, the switchblade and the butterfly knives (or balisong), the sliding knife, penny knife, and occasionally even common folding hunting knives such as the Buck 110 Folding Hunter.

=== Other ===
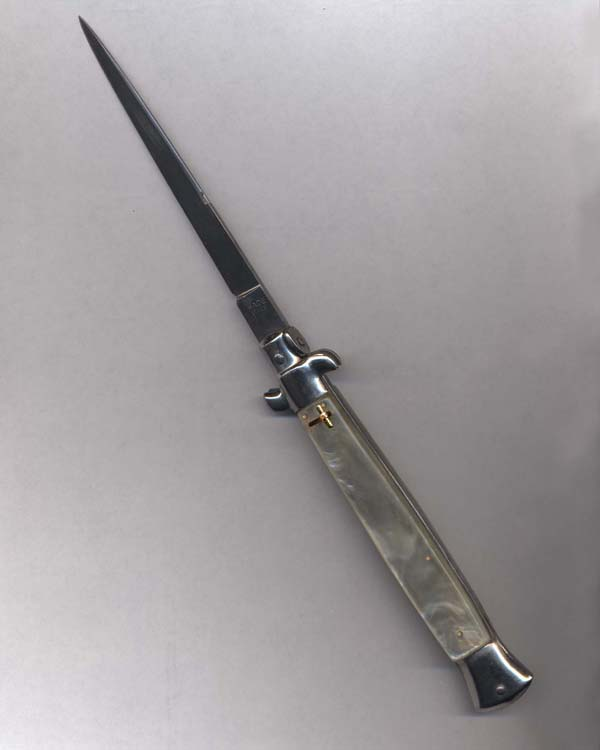
Conversion knife

The 'conversion' gravity knife is a standard folding knife fitted with after-market modifications. The knife pictured does not lock closed, and is thus classed as a 'false' gravity knife. It can still be opened manually without touching the toggle switch. The addition of the toggle, which is attached to an internal bellcrank-arm, will lift the lockback mechanism to allow the blade to swing more easily.

== Legality ==
In some countries, such as the United Kingdom, Canada, and some U.S. states, a gravity knife is proscribed under the law as a prohibited weapon, with attendant criminal penalties. Other laws may criminalize the ownership, sale, importation, or carrying of a gravity knife upon one's person, either concealed or unconcealed. In the United States, some state criminal codes prohibit either the ownership or the carrying of gravity knives, either by name or by including a functional description of their opening mechanisms. Other state criminal codes bar gravity knives by redefining them variously as switchblades or butterfly knives. Local jurisdictions including cities and counties may also restrict the ownership or carrying of gravity knives.

In a few jurisdictions, such as Colorado and New York City, courts have periodically attempted to classify ordinary lock-blade folding knives with a blade that may be opened by centrifugal force (normally, using a flicking motion of the wrist) as a gravity knife, thus making the knife's owner subject to the same criminal penalties imposed for illegal possession of a gravity knife. The New York statute banning gravity knives has been declared "unconstitutionally vague" by a federal District Court in March 2019. New York State legalized the possession of gravity knives on May 30, 2019 but New York City retains its ban on public transport.

== See also ==
- Butterfly knife
- Rampuri
- Pantographic knife, often incorrectly referred to as a "Paratrooper Knife"
