= Pantographic knife =

Type of folding knife

A pantographic knife or paratrooper knife is a folding knife whose blade is opened by a unique scissors method. The blade has a slightly longer tang than a folding knife heel. The handle is symmetrically segmented and articulated to fold away on both sides to grip the longer tang. The manner is similar to a butterfly knife (also called a Balisong knife after its modern place of origin)—with which it is often confused. Unlike the balisong knife handles that swing freely and independently, the pantographic knife uses a pantograph linkage to keep the handles aligned during opening and closing. The mechanism includes a collar that travels up the blade. The pantographic knife is very strong when compared to most other folding knife designs, being joined at several points and along several planes—this increases the force required to break the blade away from the handle. By enclosing the blade on both sides, double edged blades can be used.

This knife is also known as a paratrooper knife, although it was never issued as such to Airborne forces. It may have gotten this name because it resembles an OTF gravity knife which was used by German paratroopers.

== History ==
Examples of pantographic knives with patent markings D.R.G.M. (Deutsches Reich Gebrauchsmuster) indicate production in Germany during the Second World War, but do not imply military issue. Although this design predates Second World War, records of German paratroopers having genuinely been issued pantographic knives have not surfaced. To complicate identification, samples made with German army markings (brass handles with text in English language) seem to be post-war (1948) marketing attempts capitalizing on the term paratrooper.

== Function ==
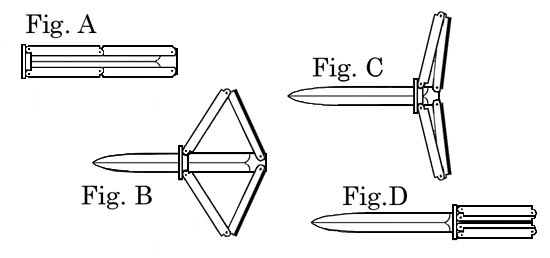

In this illustration:

- Figure A shows the closed knife, with blade retracted.
- Figure B shows the pantographic legs opening. The collar is shown sliding down the blade.
- Figure C shows the blade almost extended.
- And finally, Figure D shows the pantographic legs folded together, making a handle that is half as long as when the knife was closed.
