= Sliding knife =

Type of knife

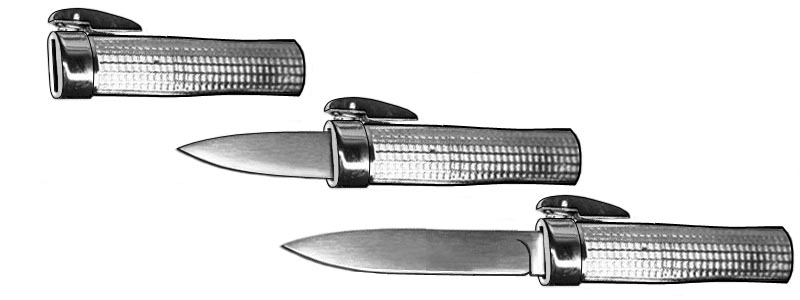
An OTF knife, showing the blade being extended from the handle

A sliding knife, also known as an OTF knife, out-the-front knife, sliding knife, telescoping knife, or angel blade, is a pocketknife with a blade that is extended through a hole in one end of the handle. This design contrasts with the majority of utility knives, which are either standard folding knives or are "fixed blade" sheath knives (having no mechanical operation).

"OTF" only refers to the basic portion of the knife's mechanical operation where the blade slides parallel with the handle to deploy.

Switchblades and gravity knives provide a great variety of different OTF mechanisms.

== "Gentlemen's" OTF knives ==
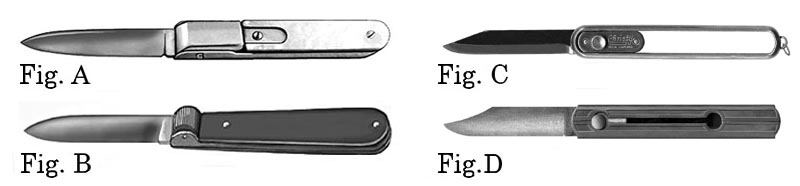

Illustrated above are four very small OTF knives. Figure A shows simple rocking jaw type button, and Figure B is a roll-lock design. Both figures depict gravity knives that fall open. The leading edge of the roll cap or jaw acts as a hole cover when closed, and rests in a groove milled across the open blade tang in order to lock open.

Figures C and D are known as sliders or sliding knives. The knife blade must be pushed with the button along the length of the handle, finger pressure must overcome friction. The lock buttons on C & D are not automatic releases. Figure C is a Christy Cutter (trademark) and Figure D is an antique design. The simplicity of sliding mechanisms have allowed some knife manufacturers to build extremely thin gentlemen's models, that are very comfortable to pocket.

== Automatic OTF knives ==
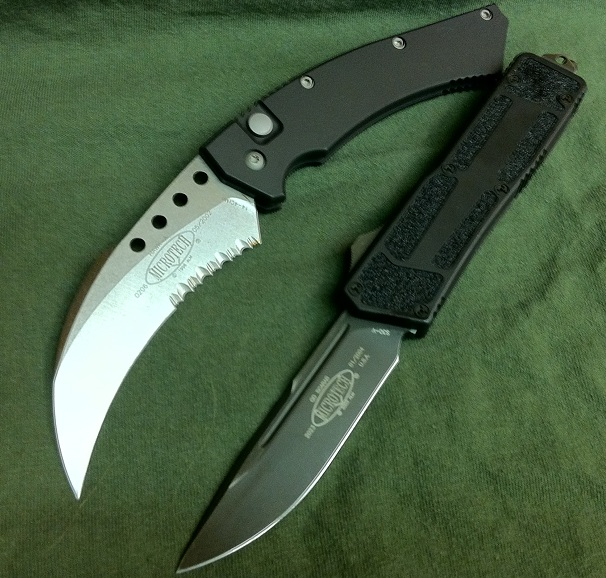
A Microtech Hawk and OTF Scarab

An automatic OTF knife blade travels within an internal track or channel in the same manner as a manual slider or gravity knife, but the automatic main spring drive and button mechanism enclosed within the knife requires a switchblade handle to be thicker or longer than a similar size gravity or sliding knife. The term "Slider" is usually not applied to automatic knives.

There are two types of "Out the Front" automatic knives, DA-OTF (double-action) and SA-OTF (single-action). Double-action OTF knives deploy and retract with a multifunction button and spring design. Single-action OTF knives deploy automatically, but must be manually cocked or retracted to close.

== Gravity OTF knives ==
A gravity OTF knife is also not considered a slider, because the blade extends outward by force of gravity or inertia, instead of finger pressure. The most famous gravity knife is the Fallschirmjaeger-Messer, or German paratrooper knife of World War II. The term gravity knife should primarily reference the Fallschirmjaeger-Messer as the archetypical example.

== Spring-assisted gravity knives ==
Some civilian gravity OTF knives have a small helper spring to kick out the blade. This partial spring drive is not sufficient to classify this type of knife as a switchblade, because it does not drive the blade out to full lock.

== Sheath-deployed telescoping knives ==
Another type of telescoping sliding knife is the Kershaw Ripcord. This is a sheath knife that partially retracts into the handle, and has a small scabbard cap covering the remaining blade tip. The design utilizes a specialized belt hanger/holsters that grasps the retracted blade so the blade is pulled fully open when unholstering. It is a unique compact fixed blade alternative. During the 1990s, a similar sheath-activated sliding knife with embossed Red Star handle was sold in the United States, claimed to be a police knife from the People's Republic of China. However, no proof of this assertion has been shown.

== Roll-lock sliding knives ==
A roll-lock knife is a type of sliding knife in which the blade rides on a track running the length of the scales, tilting into a detent to lock open or closed. Examples would be the Benchmark Rollox, or its licensed derivative, the CRKT Rollock. Sliding knives like the Rollox are not considered inertia or gravity knife.

== Spring-assisted out-the-front knives ==
Schrade and Smith & Wesson have both recently introduced OTF knives that are opened by sliding forward a handle attached to the blade to engage the torsion spring. In the US, as it is classified as spring-assisted, it is not proscribed by the Federal Switchblade Act or most state laws on switchblades.

== See also ==
- Pantographic knife
