= Thales Group =

French multinational company

Thales S.A.
- Type: Public
- Traded as: Euronext Paris: HO; CAC 40 component
- ISIN: FR0000121329
- Industry: Aerospace; Defence; Electronics; Cybersecurity
- Predecessor: Thomson-CSF
- Founded: 6 December 2000; 25 years ago
- Headquarters: Paris, France
- Area served: Worldwide
- Key people: Patrice Caine (chairman and CEO)
- Products: avionic and astrionic systems, radars and surveillance systems, military communication systems, software systems, combat vehicles, weapon systems and munitions
- Revenue: ▲€22.13 billion (2025)
- Operating income: ▲€2.08 billion (2025)
- Net income: ▲€1.67 billion (2025)
- Total assets: ▼€39.15 billion (2025)
- Total equity: ▲€7.98 billion (2025)
- Number of employees: 83,000 (2024)
- Divisions: Thales Optronics
- Subsidiaries: OEMServices; Thales Defense & Security; Thales Air Defence; Thales Underwater Systems; Thales Services; Thales Nederland; Thales Australia; Thales Japan; Thales Training & Simulation; Thales Alenia Space; Thales Elektronic Systems GmbH; Edisoft; SYSGO; Vormetric; Imperva
- Website: thalesgroup.com

Thales S.A., trading as Thales Group (French pronunciation: [talɛs]), is a French multinational aerospace and defence corporation specialising in electronics. It designs, develops and manufactures a wide variety of aerospace and military systems, devices and equipment but also operates in the cybersecurity and formerly civil ground transportation sectors. The company is headquartered in Paris' business district, La Défense, and its stock is listed on Euronext Paris.

The company was originally founded as Thomson-CSF in 1968. Following its privatisation, heavy restructuring, and reorganisation around three business areas (defence, aerospace and information technology), the firm was rebranded Thales Group in 2000, reportedly due to the company's desire to simplify and improve its brand. Throughout the 2000s and 2010s, Thales Group completed various acquisitions that have expanded its presence in the defence, ground transportation, and IT sectors.

Thales is partially owned by the French state and operates in more than 68 countries. In 2025, the company generated €22.22 billion in revenue and was the 10th largest defence contractor in the world, with 72 percent of its total revenue generated from its military activities.

== History ==
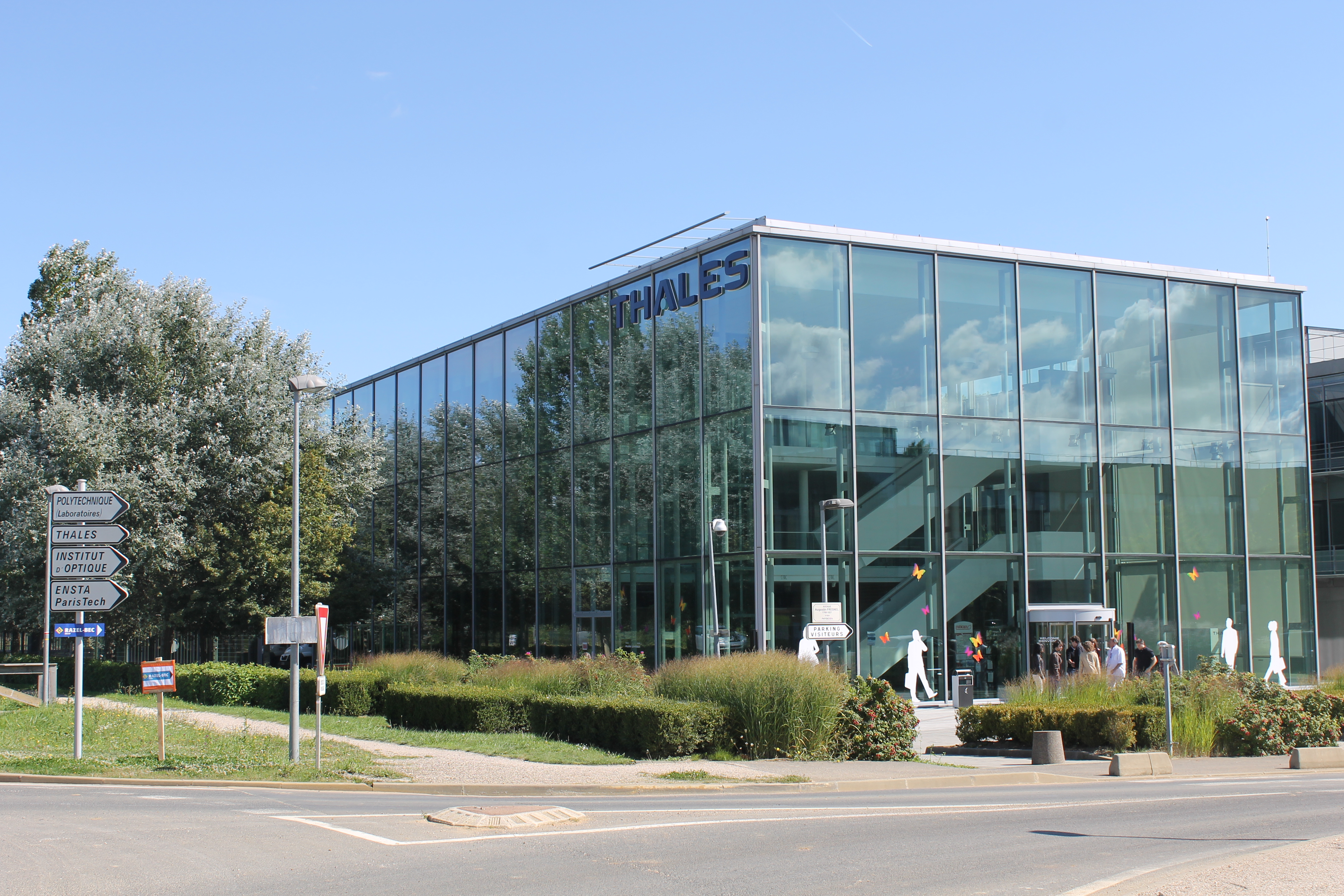
The Thales research centre in the business cluster of Paris-Saclay, France

The firm began as Compagnie Française Thomson-Houston (CFTH), established in 1893. In 1968, Thomson-Brandt (a renamed CFTH) merged its electronics arm with that of Compagnie générale de la télégraphie sans fil (CSF) to form Thomson-CSF. Following a series of reorganisations and different directions, including its nationalisation in 1982, privatisation in the late 1990s, and reorganisation around three business areas: defence, aerospace and information technology in 2000, the company changed its name to Thales Group in December of that year.

In June 2001, Thales formed ThalesRaytheonSystems, an equal-ownership joint venture with Raytheon combining their radar and communication systems divisions. It was restructured in 2016 to sell exclusively to NATO agencies and member states.

In 2002, Thales set up the joint venture company Armaris with the French shipbuilder DCN to offer a total "bottom up" shipbuilding capability. Also in 2002, Thales Broadcast Multimedia, a former subsidiary of Thales, provided China with standard short-wave radio-broadcasting equipment designed for general public radio broadcasting. Though the contract was not for this purpose, it later appeared that China used these ALLISS antennas for jamming foreign radio broadcasts to China.

In 2003, Thales UK's design won the competition for the Royal Navy Future Carrier (CVF), and the company now participates in an alliance company with BAE Systems and the United Kingdom's Ministry of Defence.

=== Acquisitions and divestments ===
In October 2006, after receiving approval from the Australian Government, Thales acquired Australian Defence Industries, a manufacturer of military equipment such as smokeless gunpowder and the Bushmaster Protected Mobility Vehicle. During 2006, Thales Navigation, a division that produced satellite navigation units, was sold to private equity group Shah Capital Partners for $170 million and renamed Magellan.

In April 2006, Thales announced it would acquire Alcatel's space business (67 percent of Alcatel Alenia Space and 33 percent of Telespazio) and Alcatel's Rail Signalling Solutions division, in a deal which raised Alcatel's ownership of Thales to 21.66 percent. The French government would also decrease its ownership in Thales to 27.1 percent from 31.3 percent as part of the acquisition. The deal would also include the Systems Integration activities (those not dedicated to telecoms operators, and covering mainly the transport and energy sectors). In January 2007, the €1.7 billion deal ($2.24 billion) was approved.

Logo of nCipher

In July 2008, Thales acquired British hardware security module vendor nCipher. In December 2008, Alcatel agreed to sell a 20.8 percent stake in Thales Group to the French aircraft manufacturer Dassault Aviation in exchange for €1.57 billion ($2.27 billion).

In 2012, the German IT supplier SYSGO was taken over by Thales Group. It provides operating systems and services for embedded systems with high safety and security-related requirements, typically using Linux. During 2014, Alcatel-Lucent initiated talks to sell its cybersecurity unit to Thales; the deal was signed in October of that year. In 2016, Thales acquired the data security company Vormetric in exchange for $400 million.

In April 2017, it acquired the data analysis firm Guavus. Later that year, it bid €4.76 billion to purchase the digital security company Gemalto. During late 2018, Thales decided to divest nCipher as a condition for its acquisition of Gemalto. in June 2019 it divested nCipher to Entrust. In 2023, Thales acquired the cybersecurity company Imperva from Thoma Bravo for $3.6 billion. The acquisition was completed in December 2023. In early July 2026, Thales announced an agreement with the company Exail (which specializes in marine drones), with a view to a 100% buyout.

== Operations ==
Thales Group supplies electronic devices and equipment used by the French Armed Forces from its past as Thomson-CSF, including the SPECTRA helmet for the army and the gendarmerie. It has worked with Dassault Aviation on the Dassault Rafale aircraft and made its SPECTRA defensive aids. Thales often worked with DCNS and designed the electronics used on French ships, and it is involved in the construction of both the Horizon and FREMM programs. Thales, as Thomson-CSF, was involved in the Taiwan frigates scandal, relating to the sale of La Fayette-class frigates to Taiwan.

It is also present in Eurosam as Thomson-CSF was a founder of the consortium along with Aérospatiale and Alenia Aeronautica. In February 2004, Thales was awarded a contract for a new command and control system for the French Navy, the SIC 21, that will be fitted on the aircraft carrier Charles de Gaulle, along with numerous navy vessels and shore locations. Additionally, the initially planned French aircraft carrier PA2 involved Thales as the main designer of the ship. However, the project was cancelled in 2013. Thales is also working on X-ray imaging, finances, energy and operating commercial satellites. By 2012, the company is mainly composed of five branches: Defense, Security, Space, Aerospace and Ground transportation.

Among the EU-supported projects Thales participates in are:

- Galileo - the European satellite navigation system, similar to GPS/Glonass/BeiDou
- SESAR - both as an aircraft equipment manufacturer and as an ATM system vendor

=== Defence ===
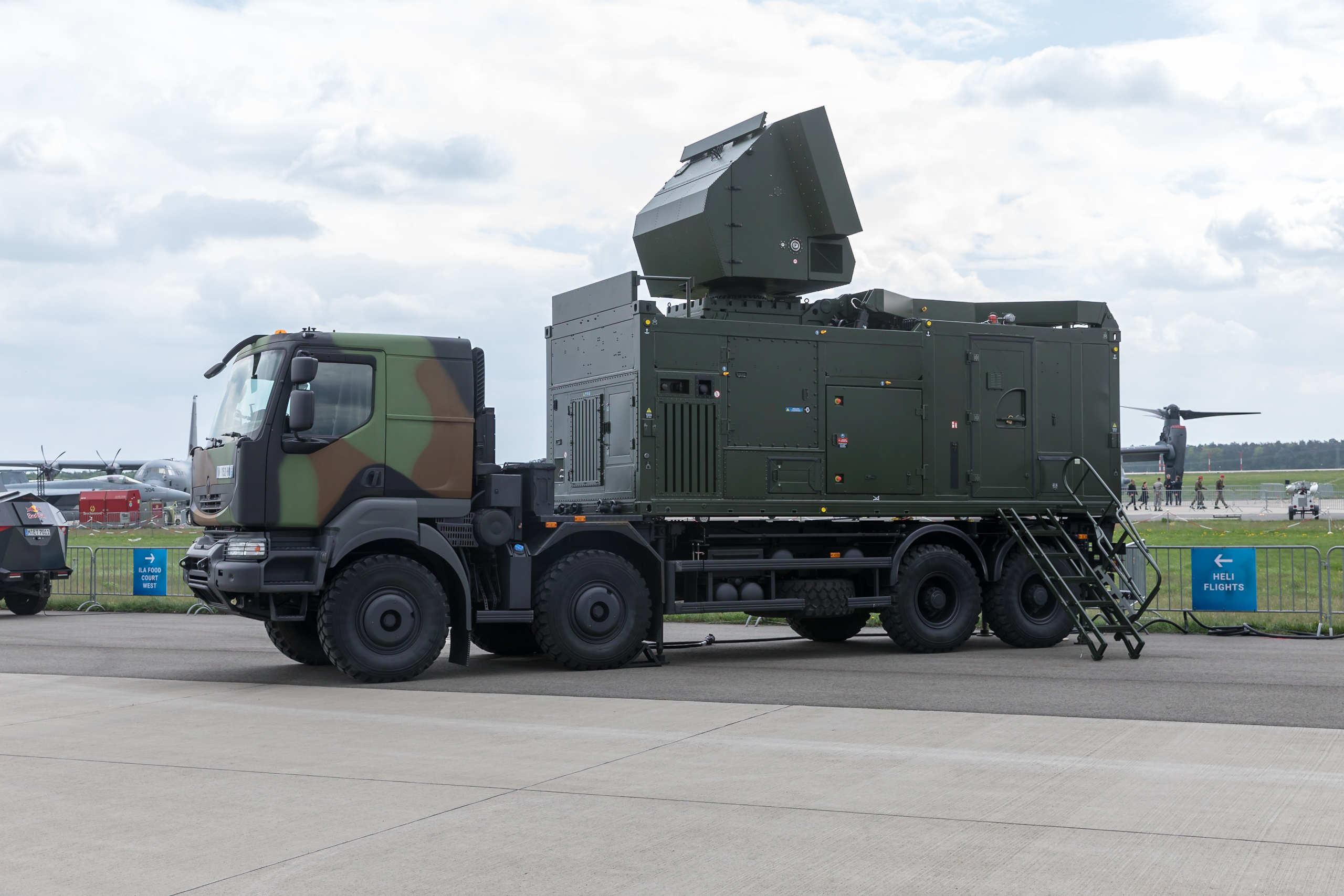
Thales Ground Master 200 active electronically scanned array

The company's design won the competition for the Royal Navy Future Carrier (CVF) programme, leading to the Queen Elizabeth-class aircraft carrier. It is part of the AirTanker consortium, the winning bid for the RAF's Future Strategic Tanker Aircraft. Thales UK won the contract for the British Army UAV programme, Watchkeeper; however, in January 2026, the company divested its 49% stake in the manufacturing joint venture, UAV Tactical Systems (U-TacS), to its partner Elbit Systems. It also produces the SWARM remote weapon station. Thales simulators include full motion devices as well as flat panels and other training facilities.

Thales Air Defence produces a range of short-range missile systems such as the Starstreak surface-to-air missile and the Lightweight Multi-role Missile (LMM).

In 2022, following the start of the Russian invasion of Ukraine, Thales was amongst several major arms manufacturers to report a sharp increase in interim sales and profits.

=== Aerospace ===
The Thales ATM (Air Traffic Management) solution is marketed under the name "TopSky", previously named "EuroCat". Thales supplies avionics to civil aircraft manufacturers, including fly-by-wire systems, cockpit systems, navigation computers, satellite communication, inflight entertainment and electrical systems. The coordination of Thales parts' servicing and maintenance is coordinated by its MRO division; OEM services, which handles the repair flow for component maintenance support.

In November 2017, Thales acquired a UK radar provider called Aveillant which produces software-defined holographic radar technology, which can detect small targets such as drones. In February 2018, Thales won on a A$1.2 billion ($946 million) contract with Airservices Australia and the Australian Department of Defence to unify Australia's civil and military airspace under a single air traffic control system, named "OneSKY".

=== Ground transportation ===
Thales has had major involvement in the UK rail industry as a result of the Racal merger and the 2006 acquisition of Alcatel's Rail Signalling Solutions division and transport business. As of 2025, Thales is to modernise 40 per cent of London Tube network London Underground.

In Denmark, Thales wholly owns the "East-west Consortium" that has been contracted to provide a nationwide travel card (Danish: "Rejsekort").

In India, Thales was selected in December 2014 by the New Delhi Metro Rail Corporation (DMRC) to deliver a completely automated fare collection system, as well as ticketing equipment. Thales has also been contracted by Hyderabad Metro Rail since 2017 to provide train control automation and communication services for the metro in Hyderabad.

In 2014, the company was tasked with equipping the public transport system of Bordeaux, France, with a contactless ticketing and revenue collection system, to be installed by February 2017. However, due to delays, the system was not expected to be operational until 2019.

In 2017, Thales was involved in a train collision in Singapore, resulting from a compatibility issue between the old signalling system's interface, and the new one. The accident resulted in 38 minor injuries. A similar incident occurred in March 2019 in Hong Kong on the Tsuen Wan line.

In Vietnam, the company was awarded a €265 million contract in 2017 to deliver the telecommunications system for the currently constructed Line 3 of the Hanoi metro. Running behind schedule by one year, the metro line is stated to be launched in 2023.

In Turkey, the Thales team delivered the first High Speed Line in the country in 2009, and has completed more than 400 km (250 mi) of the Ankara–Istanbul high-speed railway.

On 31 May 2024, Thales' ground transportation division was sold off to the Japanese firm Hitachi Rail in exchange for $2.5 billion.

== Other activities ==
Thales is also a major manufacturer of in-flight entertainment systems on board airliners. Thales' primary competitors in this area of business include Panasonic Avionics Corporation and Rockwell Collins.

Thales also produces and installs ticketing and communications systems for public transportation via its ticketing and revenue collection division. In November 2016, Thales announced its intention to divest from its transport ticketing, revenue collection, road toll and car park management business. The company entered into negotiations with Paris-based Latour Capital, but the negotiations ended in 2017 after Latour Capital announced this business was "not aligned closely enough with its investment priorities." After subsequent talks with Chinese investors failed, Thales abandoned the divestment.

== Thales international ==
Thales' international subsidiaries generated 52 percent of the company's revenue in 2008, with Thales UK being the largest of these accounting for 13 percent of group revenue. Its large presence in the UK (largely as a result of the Racal acquisition) has resulted in several high-profile contracts.

Thales has offices in:

- Africa: South Africa, Egypt, Morocco.
- Asia: Oman, Saudi Arabia, United Arab Emirates, Qatar, Pakistan, India, China, Hong Kong, South Korea, Singapore, Japan, Vietnam, Taiwan
- Europe: Norway, United Kingdom, Netherlands, Germany, Belgium, France, Denmark, Switzerland, Austria, Romania, Poland, Italy, Spain, Portugal, Hungary, Turkey
- Oceania: Australia
- North America: Canada, Mexico, United States, Dominican Republic.
- South America: Brazil, Argentina.

== Products ==
- Watchkeeper WK450 drone
- TopSky air traffic control system
- Search Master, Ocean Master and Sea Fire radars
- Bushmaster armoured vehicle
- F88 Austeyr assault rifle
- Hawkei armoured car
- Goalkeeper CIWS
- Line of Sight Communication Systems
- Starstreak missile
- Crotale missile
- Thales Ground Fire
- Ground Master 400
- Ground Master 200
- Ground Master 200 Multi Mission
- Jamming Systems
- SelTrac
- Data Protection on Demand
- AVANT In-Flight Entertainment System
- Connectivity(???)
- Full motion simulator for the Scout Armoured Vehicle
- SOSNA-U Thermal Sight (used on Russian T-72B3 and T-80BVM tanks)

== Shareholding structure ==
As of 30 June 2025, Thales' major shareholders are:

Shareholder	Stake (% of ordinary shares)
French state	26.60%
Dassault Aviation	26.59%

== Finances ==
	2016	2017	2018	2019	2020	2021	2022	2023	2024	2025
Total revenue (€ billions)	14.9	15.8	15.9	18.4	17.0	16.2	17.6	18.4	20.6	22.1
Operating income (€ billions)	1.1	1.3	1.4	1.3	0.9	1.2	1.5	1.6	1.8	2.2
Net income (€ billions)	0.9	0.8	1.0	1.1	0.4	1.1	1.1	1.0	1.4	1.7
Total assets (€ billions)	22.7	23.3	25.5	31.2	31.8	32.8	34.4	38.8	40.0	39.2
Total equity (€ billions)	4.9	5.6	5.9	5.7	5.3	6.7	7.4	7.0	7.6	8.0
Full-Time-Employees	59,842	60,820	61,774	77,755	75,735	76,135	80,138	76,299	78,189	79,263

== Controversies ==
=== Greater Manchester ===
A High Court case decided in 2012 between Thales (supplier of Greater Manchester's tram management system) and Transport for Greater Manchester (TGM) considered the operation of an audit clause in a contract, and the extent to which a supplier must comply with this. Thales had submitted claims for increased costs and for extensions to the time allowed for delivery of the system. TGM made various requests for documents intended to better help assess their claims. The Court instructed Thales to supply the requested documents.

=== Bordeaux project mismanagement ===
Thales had been contracted to provide a ticketing and revenue collection system for Transports Bordeaux Métropole (TBM), the public transport system for Bordeaux and surrounding area. Although the ticketing system in Bordeaux was originally due for launch in the summer of 2017, multiple delays pushed the new launch date back by 20 months to 2019. The project's many setbacks are considered to reflect negatively on the city's reputation, with Bordeaux's city's mayor and former French prime minister Alain Juppé, calling Thales' inability to meet its commitments "unacceptable behaviour".

=== Centralised slush fund ===
Michel Josserand, former head of THEC, a subsidiary of Thales, and Dominique Monleau alleged that Thales has a centralised slush fund that it uses to bribe officials.

=== South Africa ===
On 30 May 2005, Schabir Shaik, the financial advisor to Jacob Zuma, the deputy president of the African National Congress party, was found guilty by the High Court in Durban of organising a bribe on behalf of Thomson-CSF.

On 22 January 2020, the KwaZulu-Natal High Court in Pietermaritzburg ruled that both the Thales Group and Zuma could be criminally tried for alleged illegal arms dealings which Thales was allowed to undergo in South Africa. Zuma is said to have allowed these illegal Thales arms dealings when he was the nation's deputy president and is also believed to have partaken in them as well.

=== Taiwanese naval order ===
On 10 June 2011, Thales Group and the French government were ordered to pay 630 million euros (almost a billion US dollars) in fines after the courts heard that bribes had been paid to the Taiwanese government to win a large naval contract. Part (about 27%) of the responsibility was transferred to Thales Group because it held the legacy from Thomson-CSF. As of 2011, this is the largest corruption case in French history.

=== Brazil submarines ===
In June 2024, police in France, Spain and the Netherlands searched the offices of Thales as part of a corruption probe. The operation is the result of two investigations; the first, opened at the end of 2016, focuses on suspected corruption of a foreign official, criminal association and money laundering involving the sale of submarines, and the construction of the naval base in Brazil. The second concerns similar offences linked to the sale of military and civilian equipment abroad.

=== Kiwirok bombings ===
In October 2021, the Indonesian government carried out bombing attacks against civilians in Kiwirok, Bintang Mountains Regency, Papua (currently in Highland Papua). Australian investigative journalists found Thales-designed and -manufactured bombs had been used, together with drones made by the Chinese company Ziyan.

=== Russian supplies after arms embargo of the EU ===
Despite an EU arms embargo after the invasion of Crimea, Thales continued to supply systems to the Russian Army. This includes 800 Catherine XP thermal imaging cameras. The contract was signed in 2012. Thales also supplied TACAN navigation systems for 60 Su-30, and SMD55S head-up displays. The contract for these systems was signed in 2014, and deliveries lasted until 2018. Around 20 Topowl helmets were supplied to Russia for the MiG 29.

Sofradir, a joint venture of Thales and Safran, supplied infrared detectors beyond 2016, with 258 of these remaining to be delivered.

=== Supplies to Israel ===
Between 2018 and 2023, Thales supplied components for armed Israeli drones. According to Disclose, this equipment was likely used in strikes against Palestinian civilians. The company confirmed that it sold components to "Israeli entities". Since at least 2022, Thales has manufactured 155 mm artillery shells in Australia. These shells are exported by the United States to the Government of Israel, including $147.5 million worth of shells in December 2023. On 17 November 2023 and 3 April 2024, protesters occupied Thales offices in the Netherlands, accusing the company of being complicit in genocide in Gaza.

=== UK passport contract ===
In June 2026, Thales' supplier Linxens came under scrutiny after the Financial Times reported that the holding company owning Linxens was created by a consortium including Wise Road Capital and JAC Capital, two Beijing-based private equity firms that the U.S. government placed on its trade restriction "entity list" in 2024 over national security concerns. Linxens manufactures the inlays used in UK biometric passports, which Thales has produced under a Home Office contract since 2018. The Labour party's business and trade select committee chair, Liam Byrne, said the report would be incorporated into an ongoing parliamentary inquiry into China and the UK economy. The Home Office said no personal data leaves the UK and that it did not consider Linxens' role in the supply chain to pose a security risk, while Linxens said its inlays are made in Thailand at a certified, regularly audited facility. Thales declined to comment, citing contractual confidentiality.

=== Suspected bribery & corruption ===
In November 2024, the UK Serious Fraud Office (SFO) launched an investigation into suspected bribery and corruption within Thales.

The SFO are working collaboratively with the French authority Parquet National Financier (PNF) in the investigation. The investigation, which was initiated as a result of an employee whistleblowing, came after police in France, the Netherlands and Spain searched Thales offices in June 2024 over suspicions of corruption linked to arms sales abroad.

== Components ==
- Thales Air Defence Limited
- Thales Underwater Systems
- Thales Nederland
- Thales Optronics
- Thales Rail Signalling Solutions
- Thales Information System, (Belgium)
- Thales Avionics, (Melbourne, Florida)

== See also ==
- Bernard Favre d'Echallens
- List of defense contractors
- Thomson SA
