= Forward assist =

Method of bringing a firearm fully into battery

Forward assisting is the practice of moving the bolt or bolt carrier of a firearm fully forward in battery when the return spring has not done so (or there is a chance that it will not have done so) to prevent out-of-battery firing. It is only used on closed bolt only firearms. Some firearms have a dedicated device to allow forward assisting; on others, it is simply a procedure performed on reciprocating (i.e. attached to the bolt/bolt carrier) charging handles.

== As a device ==
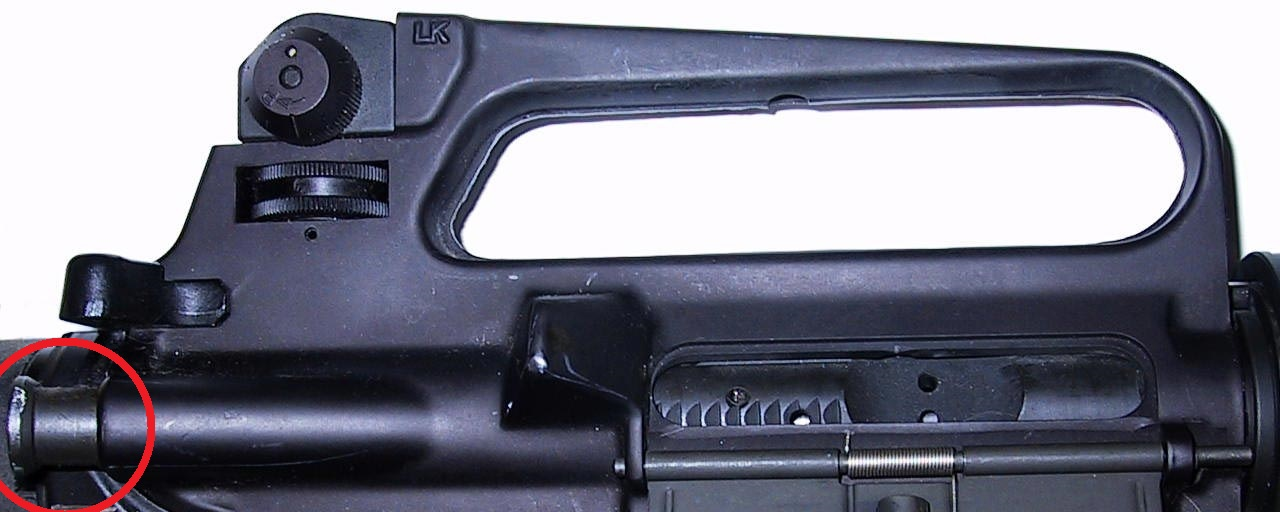
The forward assist of an M16A2 rifle, highlighted by a red circle. Note the multiple serrations on the side of the bolt carrier that interface with the device seen through the ejection port

Schematic of a forward assist

The forward assist is a button found on firearms with non-reciprocating (i.e. not attached to the bolt/bolt carrier) cocking handles, commonly on AR-15 rifle derivatives, such as the M16 rifle, and is usually located on the receiver near the bolt closure. It is a ratchet-like device that interfaces with the multiple serrations found on the side of the bolt carrier. The original AR15 and M16 designs lacked the "bolt forward assist" feature found on the later M16A1. When hit, it pushes the bolt carrier forward, ensuring that the bolt is locked. In order to ensure that the extractor is clipped around the rim of the casing, the forward assist is usually struck rather than pushed. It is commonly incorporated into standard loading procedure to prepare a firearm for firing, or to close the bolt when the firearm is excessively dirty.

Another instance where the forward assist can prove useful is when performing a stealth chamber check. Rather than letting the bolt go forward under full spring tension after verifying a round is in the chamber, the bolt can be let forward gently and then the forward assist can be used to fully close the bolt. Doing so will produce a very distinct "click" rather than the loud sound of the bolt slamming forward.

The forward assist had been used on the Heckler & Koch G41 and implemented in 2007 on the MSAR STG-556, a U.S.-made clone of the Austrian Steyr AUG rifle, but the usefulness of such device is questionable, since the design is not normally prone to the malfunction that leads to the forward assist being needed in other firearms; in fact Microtech Small Arms Research Inc., the manufacturer of the STG-556, has dropped the forward assist on all rifles manufactured since November 2008.

== As a procedure ==
On firearms where the cocking handle is permanently connected to the bolt/bolt carrier, a forward assist device is not necessary as the bolt can be assisted forwards by simply pushing or tapping the cocking handle forwards.

The forward assist is generally not necessary as a standard procedure on any firearm. An exception is the British SA80. Having realized the frequency with which the firearm jammed when taken outside of the clean environment of the test range, the forward assist was implemented to save the operator the potential danger of aiming the rifle and pulling the trigger and the rifle not going off because the bolt is not fully forward (a safety arrangement called a "safety sear" stopping the hammer from being released and the firearm firing, because of the dangers of firing with the bolt not fully closed).

The design of the L85 makes the forward assist quite awkward as the left supporting arm must come off the hand grip and reach over the top to strike the bolt forward with the left edge of the left hand, much like a "karate chop". It may be a perception of awkwardness by external users due to unfamiliarity, as the drills are not seen as awkward by common users; it is a slick and swift drill when carried out by trained personnel where reload and ready times are similar to that of M4 type counterparts.

== Further considerations for use ==
The forward assist's use can correlate with an increase in malfunctions with feeding and extraction. Test data from the original trials indicate that, while the forward assist itself is not causal to inducing a malfunction, the need to use the forward assist will likely coincide with feeding and extraction issues exclusive from the use of the forward assist. While the forward assist can be effective in some circumstances as the tests demonstrated, the firearm's user should know when to conduct a remedial action, such as cleaning the firearm, if repeated feeding and extraction issues present themselves and as time allows. It has also been demonstrated to be a safe mechanism to use even when held while firing.

== See also ==
- List of firearm terminology
- List of established military terms
- Receiver (firearms)
