= Sabre Defence =

Defunct American manufacturer of firearms and firearm parts and accessories

Sabre Defence Industries
- Type: Private Limited
- Industry: Firearms; Firearm Accessories
- Founder: Guy Savage
- Defunct: 2013
- Fate: Bankrupt. Assets acquired in 2016 by New Empire Industries.
- Headquarters: Nashville, Tennessee
- Products: XR15; M4 Carbine variants; M16A4s variants; Steyr AUG components
- Website: www.sabredefence.com

Sabre Defence Industries, LLC was an American manufacturer of firearms and firearm parts and accessories. It was contracted by the United States armed forces for parts and mounts for the M2 Browning machine gun and Minigun. In addition to its government contracts, it produced the XR15, non-standard M4 Carbines, and non-standard M16A4s, and contract components for civilian-market versions of the Steyr AUG. Sabre also acted as an importer for Sphinx Systems.

Its website now lists the company as out of business as of 2013.

== History ==
Sabre Defence was founded in December 2002 by Guy Savage.

The company was raided in 2010 by the BATF, which in 2011 indicted the company owner and four company officials on charges related to unauthorized exports of AR-15 parts to the sister company Sabre Defence Industries Inc. in the United Kingdom, and importing suppressors from Finland without the appropriate permits. The four officials have pleaded guilty to violating the appropriate laws.

In 2011, SDI went into bankruptcy protection. SDI's assets were bought by Manroy USA for $4.95 million in a bankruptcy court sale.

On June 25, 2015, Manroy USA agreed to an Article 9 liquidation. In January 2016, all assets and intellectual properties of Sabre Defence Industries and Manroy USA were purchased by New Empire Industries and relocated to Lincoln, NE.
