= Bernard Favre d'Echallens =

French businessman (born in 1950)

- Born: 1950 (age 75–76)
- Occupation: Businessman

Bernard Favre d'Echallens (born in 1950) is a French businessman. He has been in South Korea since 2000 as President and CEO of Thales Korea, the local Korean subsidiary of the international defense and commercial electronics group. On 21 March 2006 he was arrested and charged by a judge in Seoul of spying on South Korean military secrets with two counts of obtaining classified documents concerning radar equipment for the South Korean Navy. He was facing 15 years in prison during a trial which started in April 2006.

Favre d'Echallens was held in Daejeon, a provincial city 160 kilometres south of Seoul.

A South Korean court dismissed charges on 16 May 2006. Favre d'Echallens was acquitted at his trial in the central city of Daejon; a prosecution official in Daejon said they will appeal against the decision.

He was also at the time of his arrest the Treasurer of the French Korean Chamber of Commerce and Industry.
