= Microtech Knives =

American knife manufacturer

Microtech Knives, Inc.
- Type: Privately held company
- Industry: Manufacturing
- Founded: Vero Beach, Florida (1994; 32 years ago)
- Headquarters: Fletcher, North Carolina
- Key people: Tony and Susan Marfione
- Products: Knives
- Number of employees: 100+
- Website: www.microtechknives.com

Microtech Knives, Inc. is a knife manufacturing company, famous for its automatic knives, that was founded in Vero Beach, Florida in 1994, and operated there until relocating to Bradford, Pennsylvania in 2005 and to Fletcher, North Carolina in 2009. The company expanded the location of its Corporate Headquarters in nearby Mills River, NC in 2018. Microtech now has two active manufacturing factories and one corporate headquarters location.

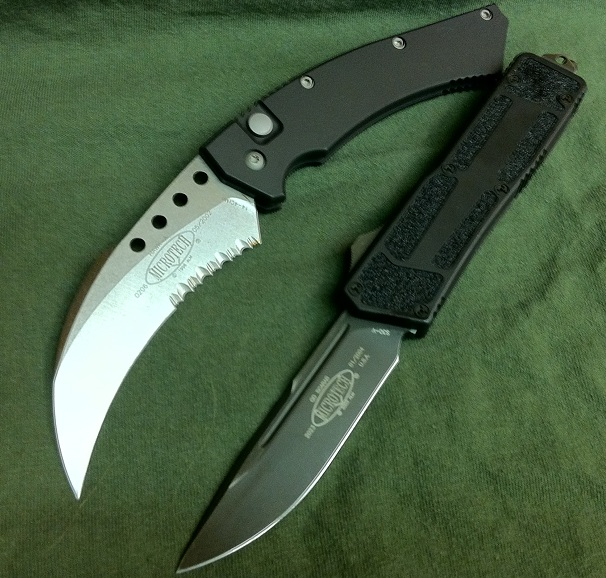
a Microtech Hawk and OTF Scarab

The company has long promoted itself as stressing quality with regard to tight machining tolerances, to within one thousandth of an inch (0.001"). Microtech has designed knives for use by the US Military such as the HALO, UDT, SOCOM and Currahee models. Custom knifemakers, such as Greg Lightfoot have remarked that these tolerances are what makes the factory knives so close to the custom design: "It has the same quality as a handmade custom."

Although Microtech has produced many styles of blades in the past such as kitchen knives, fishing knives, arrow heads, and butterfly knives; Microtech is most famous for its tactical automatic knives. The most popular designs among collectors are the "Out The Front" (OTF) and the "Double Action" (D/A) automatics. Microtech along with Benchmade Knives was responsible for the resurgence in the popularity of tactical automatic knives in the 1990s. These knives were seen more as a precision made tool utilizing powerful springs and high grade bushings as opposed to a cheap import.

Microtech has collaborated with famous knifemakers and designers such as Ernest Emerson, Bob Terzuola, Mick Strider, Walter Brend, Mike Turber, Greg Lightfoot, Reese Weiland, Borka Blades (Sebastijan Berenji) and Bastien Coves (Bastinelli Knives) on exclusive designs. A Microtech Knives "HALO" was featured on the television series 24.

== Microtech Small Arms Research ==
Microtech Small Arms Research (MSAR)
- Type: Privately held company
- Industry: Firearms
- Founded: Vero Beach, FL (1994; 32 years ago)
- Defunct: March 2015; 11 years ago
- Headquarters: Fletcher, NC
- Key people: Tony Marfione
- Products: Firearms and firearms accessories
- Number of employees: 30
- Website: www.msarinc.com (defunct)

Microtech Small Arms Research (MSAR) was a subsidiary of Microtech Knives which manufactured an American-made version of the Steyr AUG known as the MSAR STG-556. Introduced at the 2007 SHOT Show, the MSAR STG-556 is an AUG A1 clone available in either civilian, semi-automatic only and military/LE, select-fire variants.

MSAR marketed accessories for its rifles until Microtech Knives Inc. closed down the division in March 2015.

== Microtech Defense Industries ==
Microtech Defense Industries
- Type: Privately held company
- Industry: Firearms
- Founded: Mills River, NC
- Headquarters: Mills River, NC, United States
- Key people: Tony Marfione
- Products: Firearms and firearms accessories
- Number of employees: 20
- Parent: Microtech Knives
- Website: microtechdefense.com

Microtech Defense Industries is a current division of Microtech Knives exclusively manufacturing advanced firearm accessories. The first product launched was the R2K9 9mm Suppressor in 2019 and can actively be purchased through authorized dealers.
