= HEMPT 3050 =

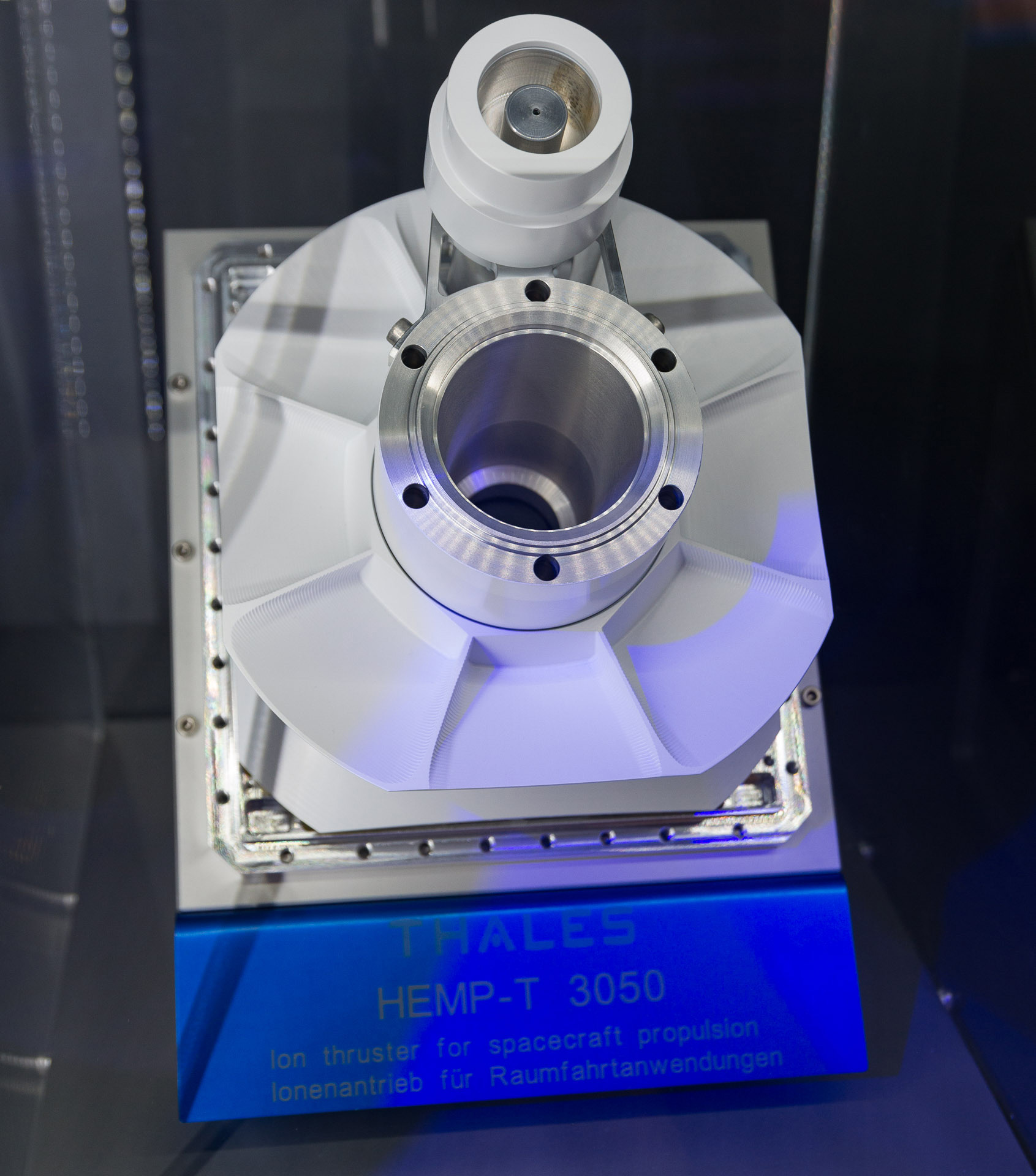
- Country of origin: Germany
- Manufacturer: Thales Elektronic Systems GmbH
- Application: Satellite Station Keeping
- Status: In development

Hall-effect thruster

Performance
- Thrust: 50 mN
- Specific impulse: 3620 s

Used in
- Heinrich Hertz

HEMPT 3050 is a satellite station-keeping Ion thruster, currently selected for the use on German Heinrich Hertz satellite. It's designed to be used for two roles: orbit-rising and station-keeping. To date it's been demonstrated to operate over 9000 hours.

Thruster was originally planned to be used on the Hispasat AG1, based on SmallGEO bus, however it was switched to the Heinrich Hertz, which is based on the same platform. Thruster design has been in development since 2002, and thanks to unique magnetic confinement it features both: high efficiency and negligible erosion, what contributes to a long lifetime.

== Specifications ==
Parameter	Value
Exhaust velocity (m/s)	28000
Thrust (mN)	44
Thrust-to-power level (mN/kW)	32.59
Specific impulse (s)	2500
Power (W)	1350
Thruster mass (kg)	6.8
Control unit mass (kg)	13
