= Thales Electronic Systems GmbH =

- Formerly: Thales Defence & Security Systems GmbH
- Company type: Subsidiary
- Industry: Space
- Founded: 1997; 29 years ago
- Headquarters: Ditzingen, Germany
- Products: Ion thrusters
- Parent: Thales Group

Thales Electronic Systems GmbH, formerly Thales Defence & Security Systems GmbH, is a wholly owned subsidiary of Thales Group. The company holds a number of patents related to ion propulsion and produces a number of electronic components.

The company participated in three projects of the ARTES programme:

- AIN - developing aluminium nitride traveling-wave tube.
- Q100W - for 100W Q-Band traveling-wave tube.
- VHPS FO - developing light, very high power, 500W S band traveling-wave tube.

== Products ==
- HEMPT 3050
