= Steyr AUG =

Austrian bullpup assault rifle

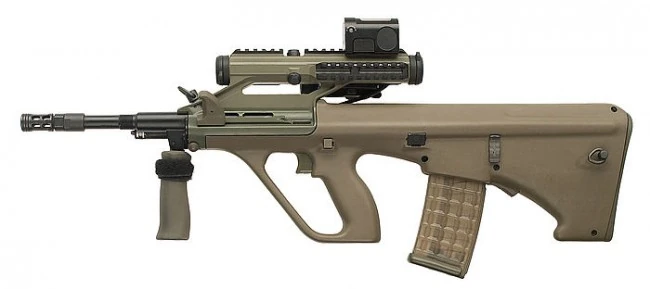
- AUG A3 with 508 mm (20 in) barrel
- Type: Bullpup assault rifle Carbine; Squad automatic weapon (HBAR); Submachine gun (AUG 9mm, AUG 40)
- Place of origin: Austria

Service history
- In service: 1978–present
- Used by: See Users
- Wars: See Conflicts

Production history
- Designer: Horst Wesp; Karl Wagner; Karl Möser
- Manufacturer: Steyr Arms; Thales Australia, Lithgow Facility; SME Ordnance; Dasan Machineries
- Produced: 1977–present
- Variants: See Variants

Specifications
- Mass: 3.6 kg (7.9 lb) (20 in barrel); 3.3 kg (7.3 lb) (16.4 in barrel); 3.2 kg (7.1 lb) (15 in barrel); 4.9 kg (10.8 lb) (HBAR); 2.97 kg (6.5 lb) (AUG 9mm)
- Length: 790 mm (31.1 in) (20 in barrel); 725 mm (28.5 in) (16.4 in barrel); 690 mm (27.2 in) (15 in barrel); 900 mm (35.4 in) (HBAR); 665 mm (26.2 in) (AUG 9mm)
- Barrel length: 508 mm (20 in) (AUG); 417 mm (16.4 in) (AUG); 382 mm (15 in) (AUG); 621 mm (24.4 in) (HBAR); 325 mm (12.8 in) (AUG 9mm); 350 mm (13.8 in) (AUG 9mm); 365 mm (14.4 in) (AUG 9mm); 420 mm (16.5 in) (AUG 9mm)
- Cartridge: 5.56×45mm NATO.300 AAC Blackout; 7.62×39mm 9×19mm Parabellum.40 S&W
- Action: Gas-operated, rotating bolt
- Rate of fire: 680–750 rounds/min (AUG, HBAR); 650–720 rounds/min (AUG 9mm)
- Muzzle velocity: 970 m/s (3,182 ft/s) (20 in barrel)
- Effective firing range: 300 m (330 yd)
- Maximum firing range: 2,700 m (3,000 yd)
- Feed system: 5.56×45mm NATO: 30- and 42-round proprietary detachable box magazines; 9×19mm Parabellum: 25- and 32-round detachable MPi 69 box magazines; .40 S&W: Glock magazines
- Sights: Swarovski 1.5× telescopic sight, emergency battle sights, and Picatinny rail for various optics

The Steyr AUG (German: Armee-Universal-Gewehr, lit. 'army universal rifle') is an Austrian bullpup assault rifle chambered for the 5.56×45mm NATO intermediate cartridge, designed in the 1960s by Steyr-Daimler-Puch, and now manufactured by Steyr Arms GmbH & Co KG.

The AUG was adopted by the Austrian Army in 1977 as the StG 77 (Sturmgewehr 77), where it replaced the 7.62×51mm NATO StG 58 automatic rifle. In production since 1977, it is the standard small arm of the Bundesheer and various Austrian federal police units and its variants have also been adopted by the armed forces of dozens of countries, with some using it as a standard-issue service rifle.

The importation of the Steyr AUG into the United States began in the 1980s as the AUG/SA (SA denoting semi-automatic). The AUG was banned from importation in 1989 under President George H. W. Bush's executive order restricting the import of foreign-made semiautomatic rifles deemed not to have "a legitimate sporting use." Six years into the ban, AUG buyers gained a reprieve as cosmetic changes to the carbine's design allowed importation once again. Changes included redesigning its pistol grip into a thumbhole stock and leaving its barrel unthreaded to prevent attachment of a flash hider or suppressor.

The Federal Assault Weapons Ban, passed in 1994, further prohibited the manufacture of additional Steyr AUGs or their copies. The ban expired in 2004, and in 2008, Steyr Arms worked with Sabre Defence to produce parts legally in the U.S.

== Design details ==
The Steyr AUG is a selective-fire, bullpup assault rifle with a conventional gas-piston-operated action that fires from a closed bolt. It is designed as a modular weapon system that could be quickly configured as an assault rifle, a carbine, a submachine gun and even an open-bolt light machine gun.

The AUG is chambered for the 5.56×45mm NATO cartridge and has the standard 1:9 rifling twist that will stabilise both SS109/M855 and M193 rounds. Some nations, including Australia, Ireland and New Zealand, use a version with a 1:7 twist optimised for the SS109 NATO round. The submachine gun variants are chambered in either 9×19mm Parabellum or .40 S&W. In Enforce Tac 2025, a Steyr AUG chambered in 7.62×39mm was unveiled.

The AUG consists of six interchangeable assemblies: the barrel, receiver with integrated telescopic sight or Picatinny rail, bolt carrier assembly, trigger mechanism, stock, and magazine. The AUG employs advanced firearms technology, and is constructed from multiple polymers and aluminium components.

The AUG comes with a muzzle cap, spare bolt for left-handed shooters, blank-firing adaptor, cleaning kit, sling and either an American M7 or German KCB-77 M1 bayonet.

=== Engineering ===
The quick-change barrel used in the AUG is cold hammer-forged for increased precision and durability; its bore, chamber and certain components of the gas system are chrome-plated (currently nitride on US market rifles). The standard rifle-length barrel features 6 right-hand grooves and a rifling twist rate of 228 mm (1:9 in). An external sleeve is shrunk onto the barrel and carries the gas port and cylinder, gas valve and forward grip hinge jaw. There is a short cylinder which contains a piston and its associated return spring. The barrel locks into a steel insert inside the receiver through a system of eight lugs arranged around the chamber end, and is equipped with a folding vertical grip that helps to pivot and withdraw the barrel during barrel changes. The most compact of the barrels has a fixed vertical grip.

The receiver housing is a steel-reinforced aluminium extrusion finished with a baked enamel coating. It holds the steel bearings for the barrel lugs and the guide rods. The non-reciprocating plastic cocking handle works in a slot on the left side of the receiver and is connected to the bolt carrier's left guide rod. The cocking handle has a forward assist feature—alternatively called a "silent cocking device"—allowing the user to fully push the bolt home without racking the charging handle. A bolt hold-open device locks the bolt carrier back after the last round has been fired. The AUG A3s feature a bolt release button; before this development, all AUGs and the USR required the user to rack the charging handle to disengage the bolt hold-open after inserting a fresh magazine. Older versions of the AUG can be upgraded to use the newer A3 stock and hammer pack.

The AUG's stock is made from fibreglass-reinforced polyamide 66. At the forward end is the pistol grip with an enlarged forward trigger guard completely enclosing the firing hand that allows the rifle to be operated with winter gloves. The trigger is hung permanently on the pistol grip, together with its two operating rods, which run in guides past the magazine housing. Behind that is the locking catch for the stock group. Pressing this to the right will separate the receiver and stock. The magazine catch is behind the housing, on the underside of the stock. Above the housing are the two ejector openings, one of which is always covered by a removable strip of plastic. The rear of the stock forms the actual shoulder rest, which contains the hammer unit and the end of the bolt path. The butt is closed by an endplate which is held in place by the rear sling swivel. This swivel is attached to a pin which pushes in across the butt and secures the plate. There is a cavity under the buttplate that holds a cleaning kit.

=== Operating mechanism ===
The AUG has a rotating bolt that features 7 radial locking lugs and is unlocked through a pin on the bolt body and a recessed camming guide machined into the bolt carrier. The bolt carrier itself is guided by two guide rods brazed to it, and these rods run inside steel bearings in the receiver. The guide rods are hollow and contain the return springs. The bolt also contains a claw extractor that forms the eighth locking lug and a spring-loaded "bump"-type casing ejector.

The gas cylinder is offset to the right side of the barrel and works with one of the two guide rods. The AUG uses a short-stroke piston system where the right guide rod serves as the action rod, transmitting the rearward motion of the gas-driven piston to the bolt carrier. The left-hand rod provides retracting handle pressure when connected by the forward assist and can also be utilised as a reamer to remove fouling in the gas cylinder. The firearm uses a 3-position gas valve. The first setting, marked with a small dot, is used for normal operation. The second setting, illustrated with a large dot, indicates fouled conditions. The third, "GR" closed position is used to launch rifle grenades (of the non-bullet trap type).

The AUG is hammer-fired and the firing mechanism is contained in the rear of the stock, near the butt, covered by a synthetic rubber shoulder plate. The hammer group is made entirely of plastics except for the springs and pins and is contained in an open-topped plastic box which lies between the magazine and the buttplate. During firing the recoiling bolt group travels over the top of it, resetting the hammer. Since the trigger is located some distance away, it transmits its energy through a sear lever which passes by the side of the magazine. The firing pin is operated by a polymer hammer under pressure from a coil spring.

Some common criticisms of the AUG's trigger are the trigger feeling "mushy" and having excessive take-up. This is due to the relatively imprecise nature of how the trigger linkage is installed by the factory. The trigger can be "tuned" by the user in roughly 15 to 60 minutes with a 12 inch-pound wrench with a hex bit.

=== Firing mechanism ===
The AUG's firing mechanism can also be changed at will, into a variety of configurations, including semi-auto and full-auto, semi-auto and three-round-burst, semi-auto-only, or any other combination that the user desires. It can also be converted into an open-bolt full-auto-only mode of fire, which allows for improved cooling and eliminates cook off problems when the AUG is used as a light machine gun.

=== Trigger ===
The AUG features a progressive trigger (pulling the trigger halfway produces semi-automatic fire, pulling the trigger all the way to the rear produces fully automatic fire), and a safety mechanism (cross-bolt, button type) located immediately above the hand grip. In its "safe" position (white dot), the trigger is mechanically disabled; pressing the safety button to the left exposes a red dot and indicates the rifle is ready to fire. Some versions have an ALO or "automatic lockout", a small projection at the base of the trigger. This was first included on the Irish Defence Forces variant of the rifle, and soon after, the Australian Defence Forces variant. In the exposed position, the ALO stops the trigger being squeezed past the semi-automatic position. If needed, the ALO can be pushed up to permit automatic fire.

=== Ammunition and magazine ===
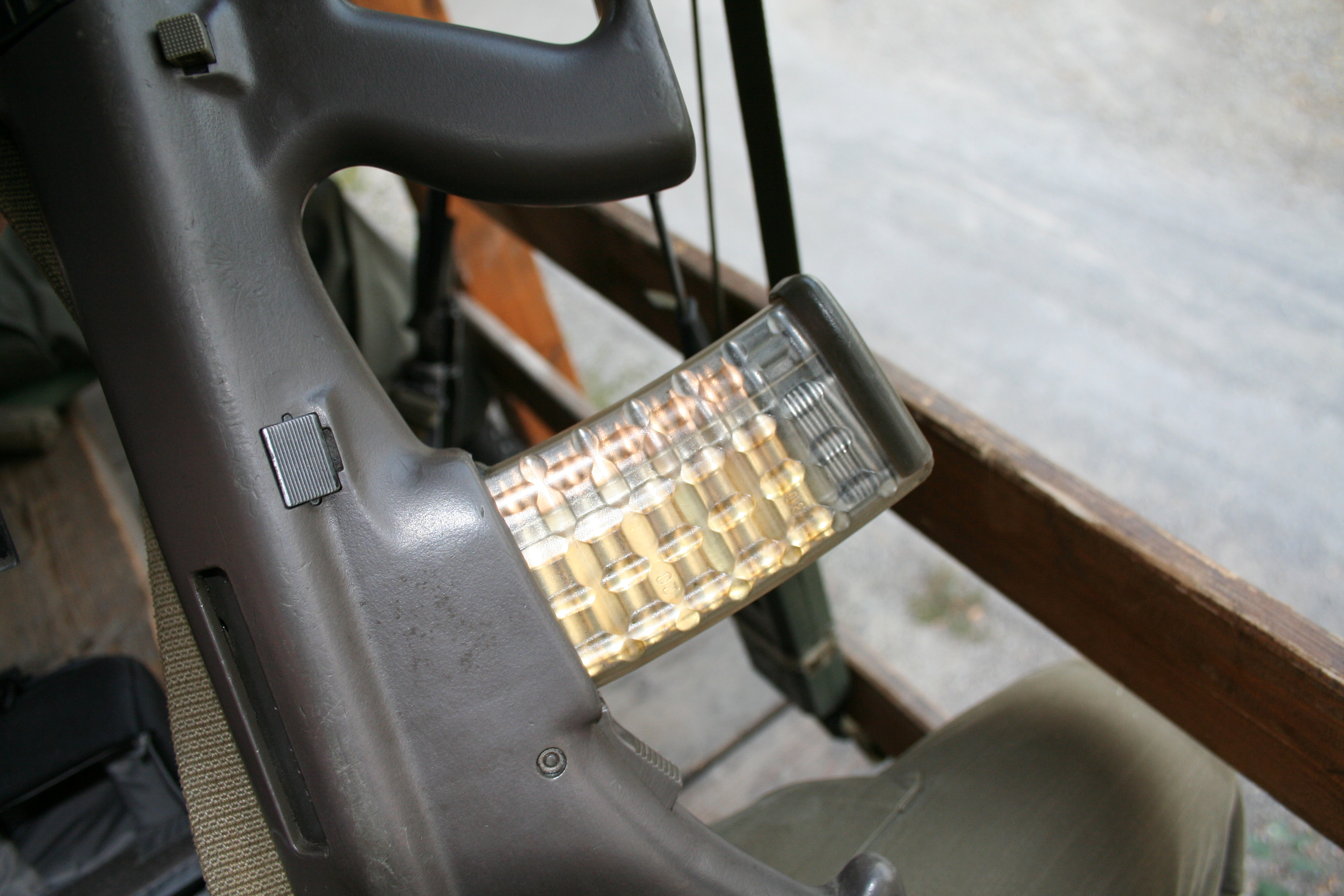
Steyr AUG with a loaded 30-round proprietary magazine

The AUG is fed from a detachable proprietary translucent-polymer double-column box magazine with either a 30- or 42-round capacity. Optional NATO stock for STANAG magazine compatibility is also available.

=== Receivers ===
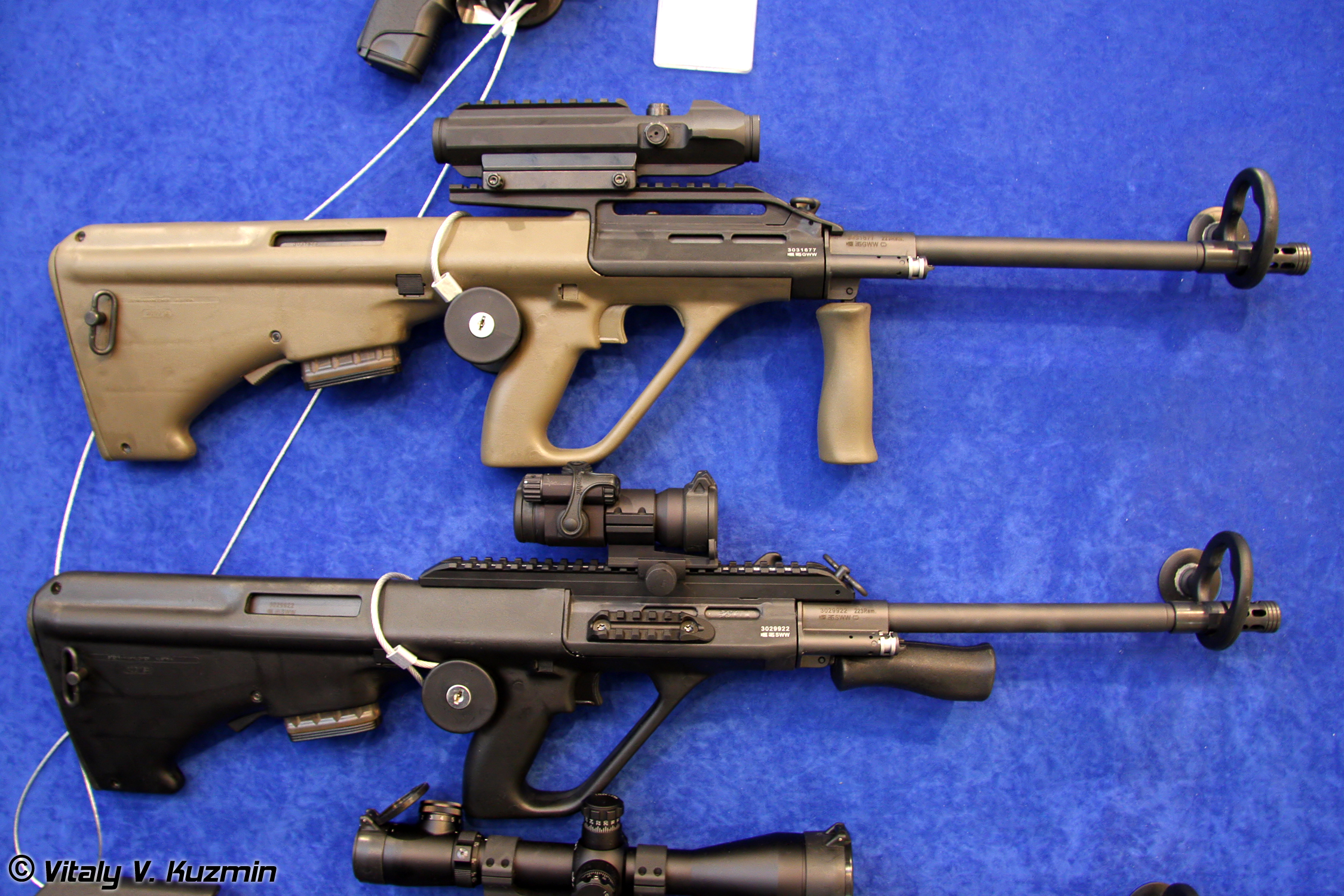
Steyr AUGs with tan and black finish. Note the different type of Picatinny rail upper receivers

The AUG's receiver can be changed from the standard model with a carrying handle and built-in 1.5× optical sight to the 'Special Receiver' which has a STANAG scope mount to allow for the use of a variety of scopes and sights. In later models (A2 and A3), it has several different types of receivers with Picatinny rails.

=== Sights ===
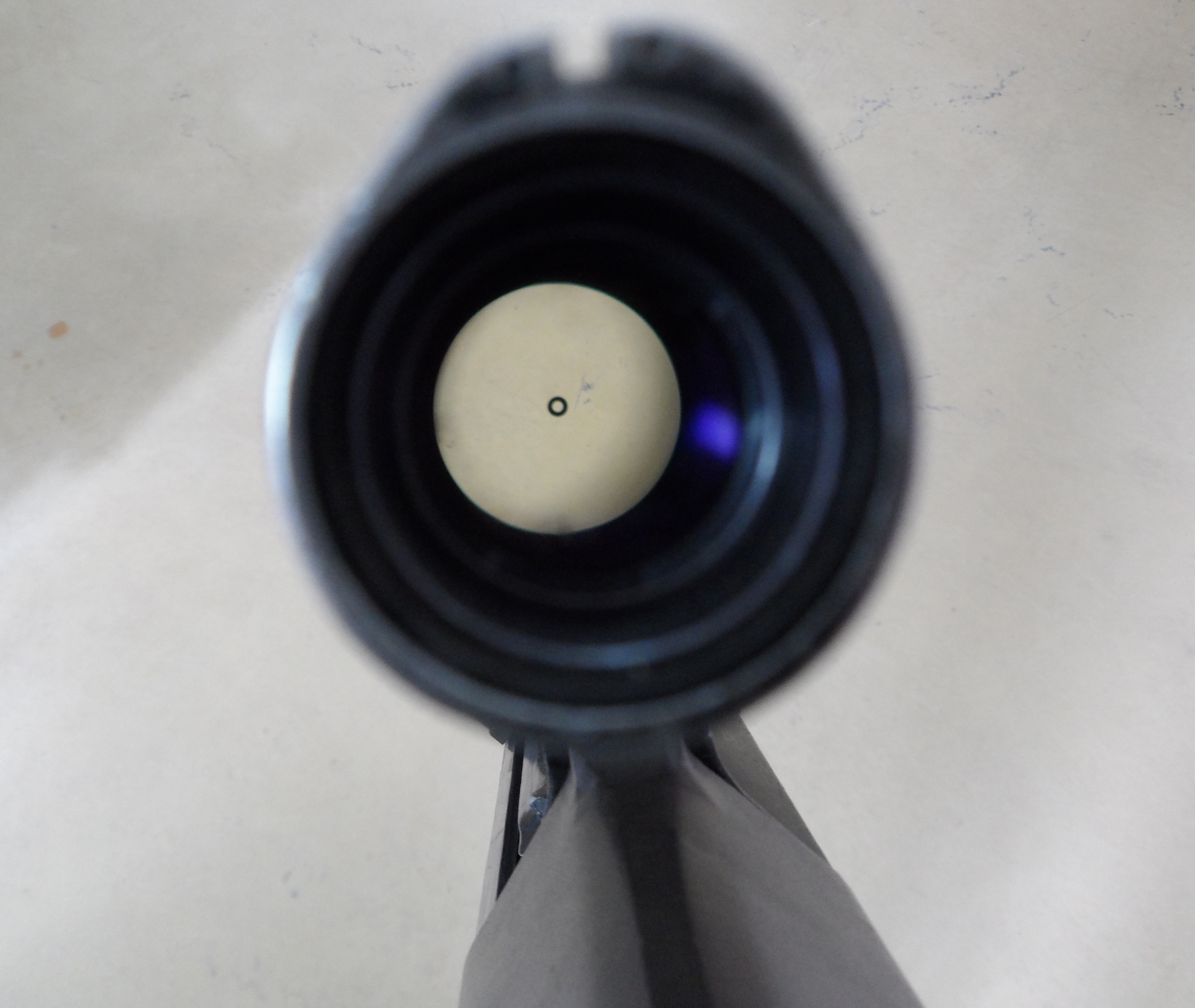
Steyr AUG's telescopic sight. Note the backup iron sights on top of the scope

The AUG has a 1.5× telescopic sight that is integrated with the receiver casting and is made by Swarovski Optik. It contains a simple black ring reticle. The sight cannot be set to a specific range but can be adjusted for windage and elevation for an initial zero and is designed to be calibrated for 300 m. It also has a backup iron sight with a rear notch and front blade, cast into the top of the aluminium optical sight housing, in case of failure or damage to the primary optical sight. The sight is also equipped with a set of three illuminated dots (one on the front blade and two at the rear) for use in low-level lighting conditions. In order to mount a wide range of optics and accessories, a receiver with a NATO-standard Picatinny rail and detachable carrying handle was also developed and introduced in December 1997. Modern AUGs are equipped with, or can have the Picatinny rail swapped out with, an A3SF 60mm height ×3 optic with optional riser and additional crosshair within the "donut" black ring. This specific optic can be piggybacked with other optics on top, as is the norm with Austrian special forces, due to the Picatinny rail included on top of the optic.

=== Barrels and muzzle devices ===
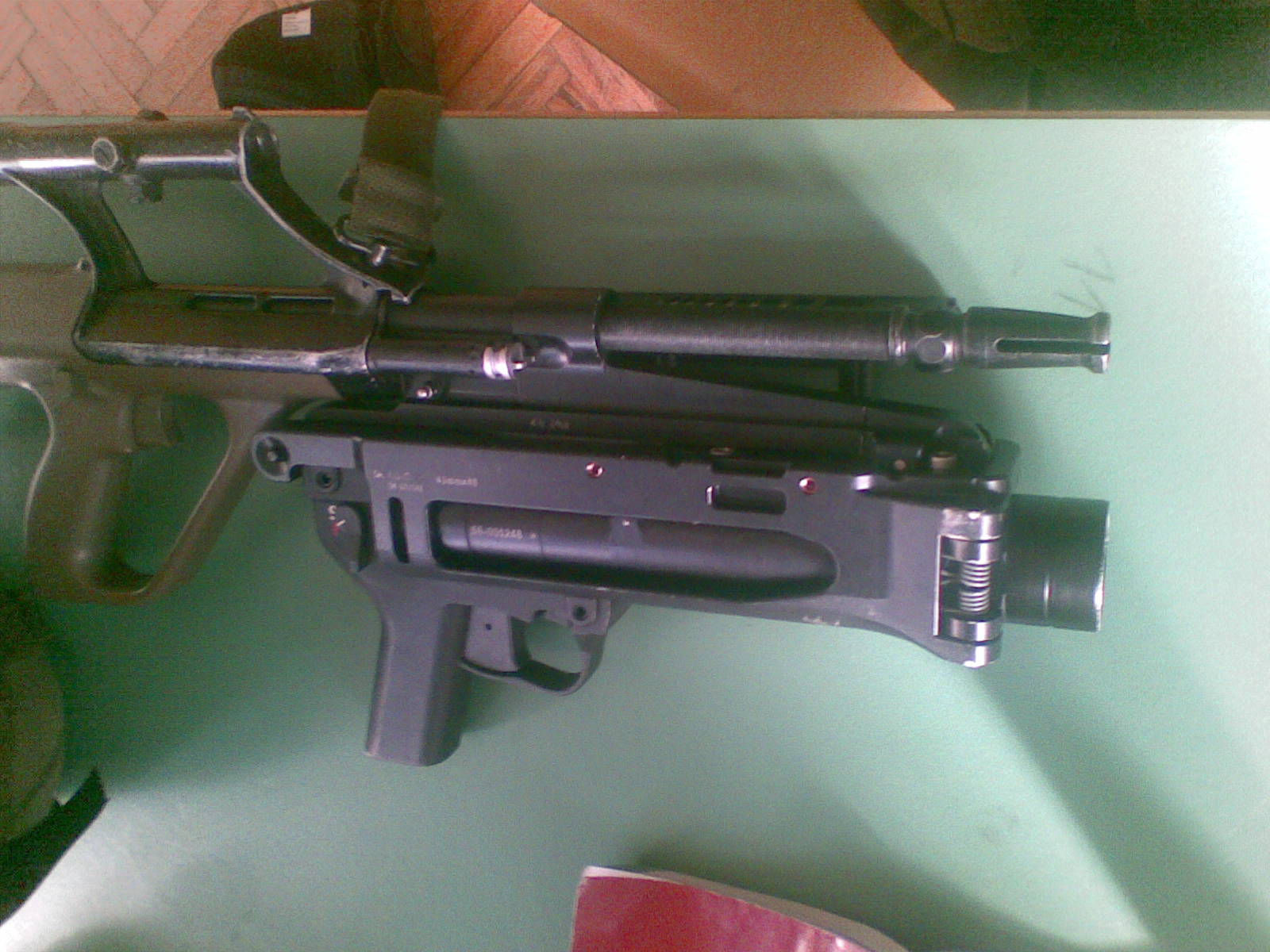
Steyr AUG A1 with a 40 mm AG36 grenade launcher

The AUG features quick detachable barrels and are available in different lengths; including a 382 mm (15 in) compact length, 417 mm (16.4 in) carbine length and 508 mm (20 in) standard rifle-length. The muzzle device primarily used for these barrel lengths is a three-pronged, open-type flash suppressor. The flash suppressors are screwed to the muzzle and internally threaded to take a blank-firing attachment. AUGs equipped with the 508 mm (20 in) pattern barrels produced for military purposes are also equipped with bayonet lugs. The 417 mm (16.4 in) and 508 mm (20 in) barrels are capable of launching NATO STANAG type 22 mm rifle grenades from their integral flash hiders without the use of an adapter. AUG barrels can also mount 40 mm M203 or AG36 grenade launchers. Steyr also offers 508 mm (20 in) barrel configurations fitted with a fixed, post front-sight used on the rifle version with aperture iron sights. A 621 mm (24.4 in) heavy barrel with an integrated lightweight folding bipod with a closed-type ported muzzle device (combination of flash suppressor and compensator) is also available, primarily used on the AUG HBAR.

=== Stock ===
While the AUG is not fully ambidextrous, it can be configured to be used by left- or right-handed operators by changing the bolt to one that has the extractor and ejector on the appropriate side and moving the blanking plate to cover the ejection port not in use. However, there exists also a right-hand-only stock that allows for the use of STANAG magazines.

Until March 2025, the NATO stock did not have a bolt release next to the magazine. To release the bolt after emptying the magazine, the user would need to remove the empty magazine, insert a fresh magazine, pull the charging handle back and release.

With the updated NATO stock, the operator can release the bolt using the bolt release next to the magazine well.

== Variants ==
=== AUG ===
The Steyr AUG can also be fitted with either an M203 or AG-C grenade launcher.

- The Steyr AUG A1 is fitted with an integral 1.5× optic and is available with a choice of olive or black furniture.
- The Steyr AUG A2, introduced in December 1997, features a redesigned charging handle and a detachable telescopic sight which can be replaced with a Picatinny rail. Its modularity allows a 24.4-inch barrel to be used, and the folding grip can be replaced with a Picatinny rail section, to which a bipod can be installed.
- The Steyr AUG A3 features a Picatinny rail on top of the receiver and an external bolt release. In 2019, Steyr Arms introduced a .300 AAC Blackout variant of the AUG A3.
  - The Steyr AUG A3 SF features a Picatinny rail mounted on the telescopic sight and on the right side of the receiver, and includes an external bolt release. The integrated telescopic sight is offered in 1.5× or 3× magnification.
  - The Steyr AUG A3-CQC was a cancelled prototype development of the AUG A3 and was first displayed by Steyr at the SHOT Show in 2006 and 2007. It differs in having a railed handguard attached ahead of the receiver and features an 18 in (457 mm) barrel. Because this extra railed section needed to be removed to strip the rifle for cleaning, the left side featured a quick detach lever. Due to the concerns over the extra cost and weight, along with potential issues with the reliability and consistency of the detachable handguard, the prototypes received little interest and were last seen promoted by Steyr in 2008. In 2012, the American company PJA obtained the five original prototypes from Steyr and reverse engineered them in order to produce a US-made AUG A3-CQC and conversion kits.
  - The Steyr AUG A4 is the fourth generation iteration of the AUG, as seen on Spartanat. While not announced formally on Steyr's website, the AUG's page features a close-up of an operator aiming the AUG A4 on the website's upper banner. The release is meant to coincide with the AUG's 50th birthday.

=== AUG HBAR ===
The Steyr AUG HBAR (Heavy Barrelled Automatic Rifle), also known as the AUG LMG (light machine gun), is essentially a squad automatic weapon variant of the AUG. It features a heavier and longer 621 mm (24.4 in) barrel with an integrated bipod, and the standard AUG receiver with 1.5× magnification scope. It fires from an open bolt to be more suitable for sustained fire, mitigating accidental cook offs. To accomplish this, it uses a modified bolt carrier, striker and trigger mechanism with sear.

- The Steyr AUG HBAR-T (Heavy Barrelled Automatic Rifle-Telescope) is similar to the AUG HBAR, but features a special receiver with a STANAG scope mount system usually fitted with a Schmidt & Bender 4×25 or Kahles ZF69 6×42 optical sight.

=== AUG 9mm ===
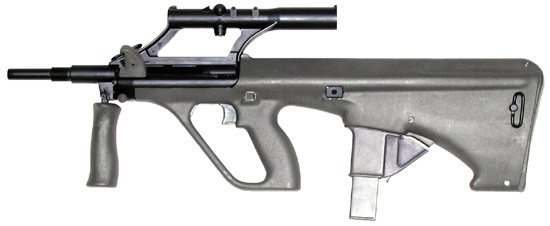
Steyr AUG 9mm with 420 mm (16.5 in) barrel

The Steyr AUG 9mm, also known as the AUG Para, is a submachine gun variant of the AUG chambered for the 9×19mm Parabellum cartridge and has been produced since 1988. It differs from the rifle variants by having a unique 420 mm (16.5 in) barrel with six right-hand grooves at a 250 mm (1:9.8 in) rifling twist rate, with a recoil compensator, a slightly different charging handle, and a magazine well adapter enabling the use of Steyr MPi 69 25- and 32-round box magazines. It is blowback-operated and fires from a closed bolt, omitting the original rifle's gas system. A conversion kit used to transform any assault rifle configuration into the submachine gun configuration is also available. The conversion kit consists of a barrel, bolt, adapter insert, and magazine.

- The Steyr AUG A3 9mm XS is a 9×19mm variant of the AUG A3. It fires at a cyclic rate of around 650–720 rounds per minute. It is available in either a 325 mm (12.8 in), 350 mm (13.8 in), 365 mm (14.4 in), 420 mm (16.5 in) barrel lengths, and features a Picatinny rail system similar to the AUG A3.
- The Steyr AUG 40 is a .40 S&W variant of the AUG A3 9mm XS that uses Glock-compatible double-stack .40 S&W magazines. It is offered with a 332 mm (13.1 in) barrel.

=== Austrian adopted variants ===
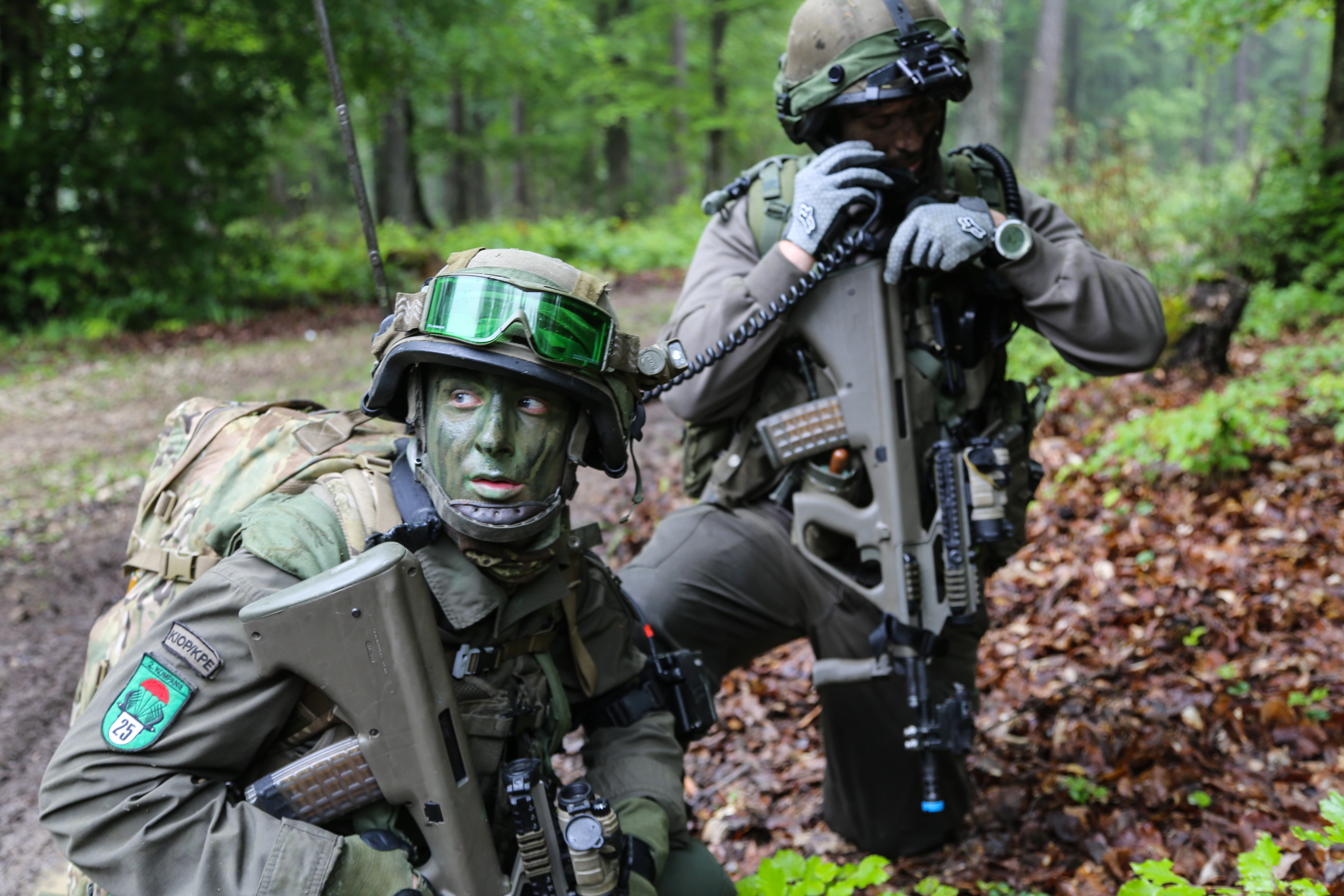
Austrian soldiers with an StG 77 KPE during a combat exercise

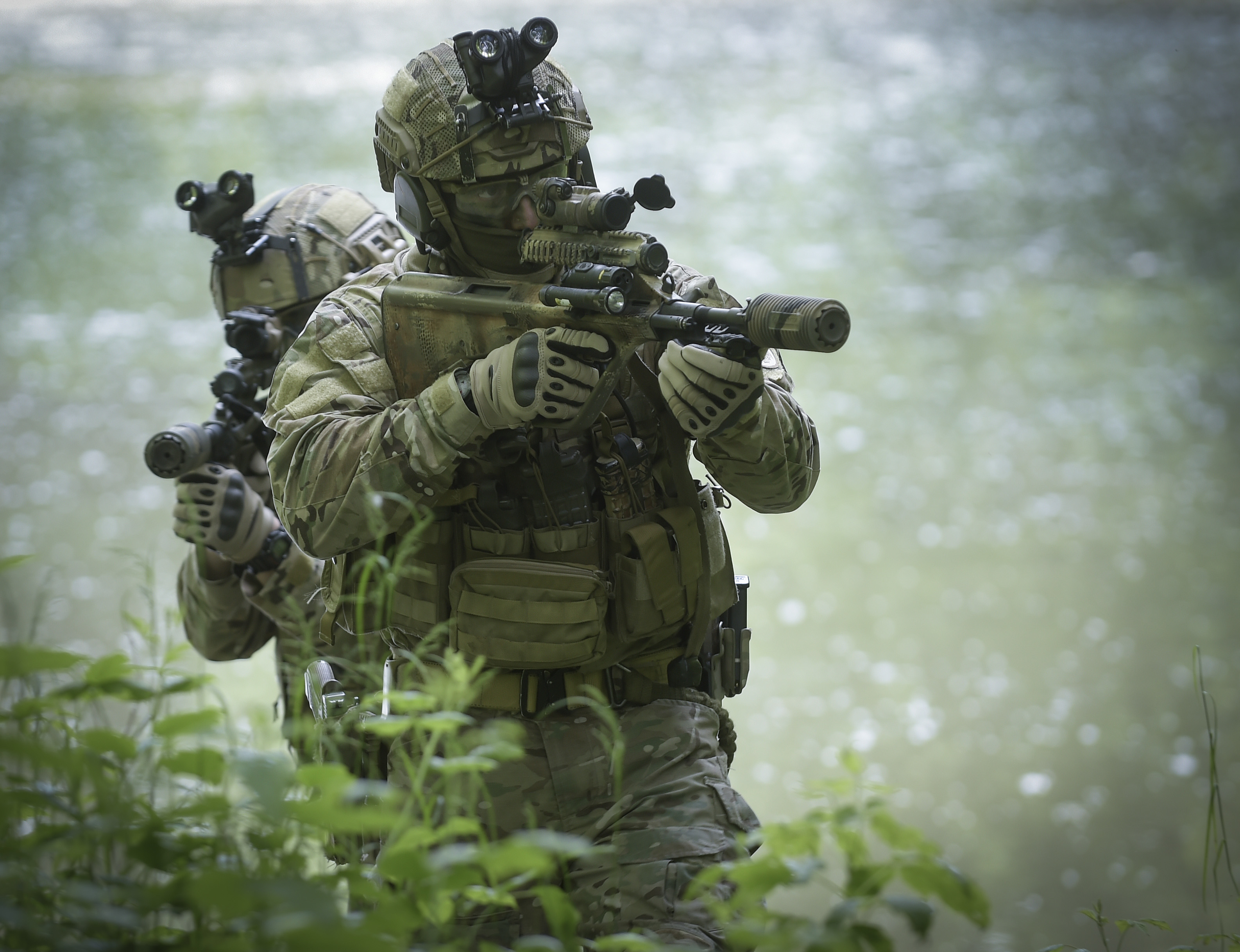
Austrian special forces with an StG 77 A2 Kommando during a training exercise

The StG 77 (Sturmgewehr 77) is the designation given by the Austrian Armed Forces when they adopted the Steyr AUG in 1977.

- The StG 77 A2 Kommando is the designation given by the Austrian Special Forces (Jagdkommando) for the Steyr AUG A3 SF when it was adopted in late 2007.
- The StG 77 KPE is the Austrian Army's designation for an upgraded StG 77. The A1 housing group was replaced with the A3 SF housing and was adopted in 2017.
- The StG 77 A1 MP is the Austrian Military Police's designation for the StG 77. The rifles differ from the StG 77 by having a Picatinny rail for an Aimpoint Micro T1 and red dot magnifier, a flash hider from Ase-Utra, and Rheinmetall Vario Ray laser and light module mounted on the right side. Adopted in 2018.
- The StG 77 A1 MOD is the Austrian Army's designation of a further modified StG 77. A total of 14,400 rifles will be issued to both the militia and cadre presence units.
- The StG 77 A2 KDO MOD is a modified StG 77 A2 Kommando with M-LOK handguard, Kawatec trigger, Aimpoint on a riser, Steyr brass deflector and Rheinmetall light/laser module.
- The StG 77 A1 MOD "Nightfighter" a modified StG 77 A1 MOD with a top-mounted Aimpoint Micro T2 optic and lower-mounted telescopic sight with 3x magnification sight, a tactical laser light module that attaches to a Picatinny rail on the right side of the rifle and the rifle features a special surface coating that makes it more difficult for enemy night vision devices to detect.

=== Australian adopted variants ===
The Australian Defence Force (ADF) adopted a modified Steyr AUG designated as the F88 Austeyr. From the late 1980s, the F88 became the ADF's standard issued rifle replacing the L1A1 SLR and M16A1 in the Australian Army. From the mid-2010s, the Enhanced F88 (EF88) Austeyr replaced the F88.

==== F88 Austeyr ====
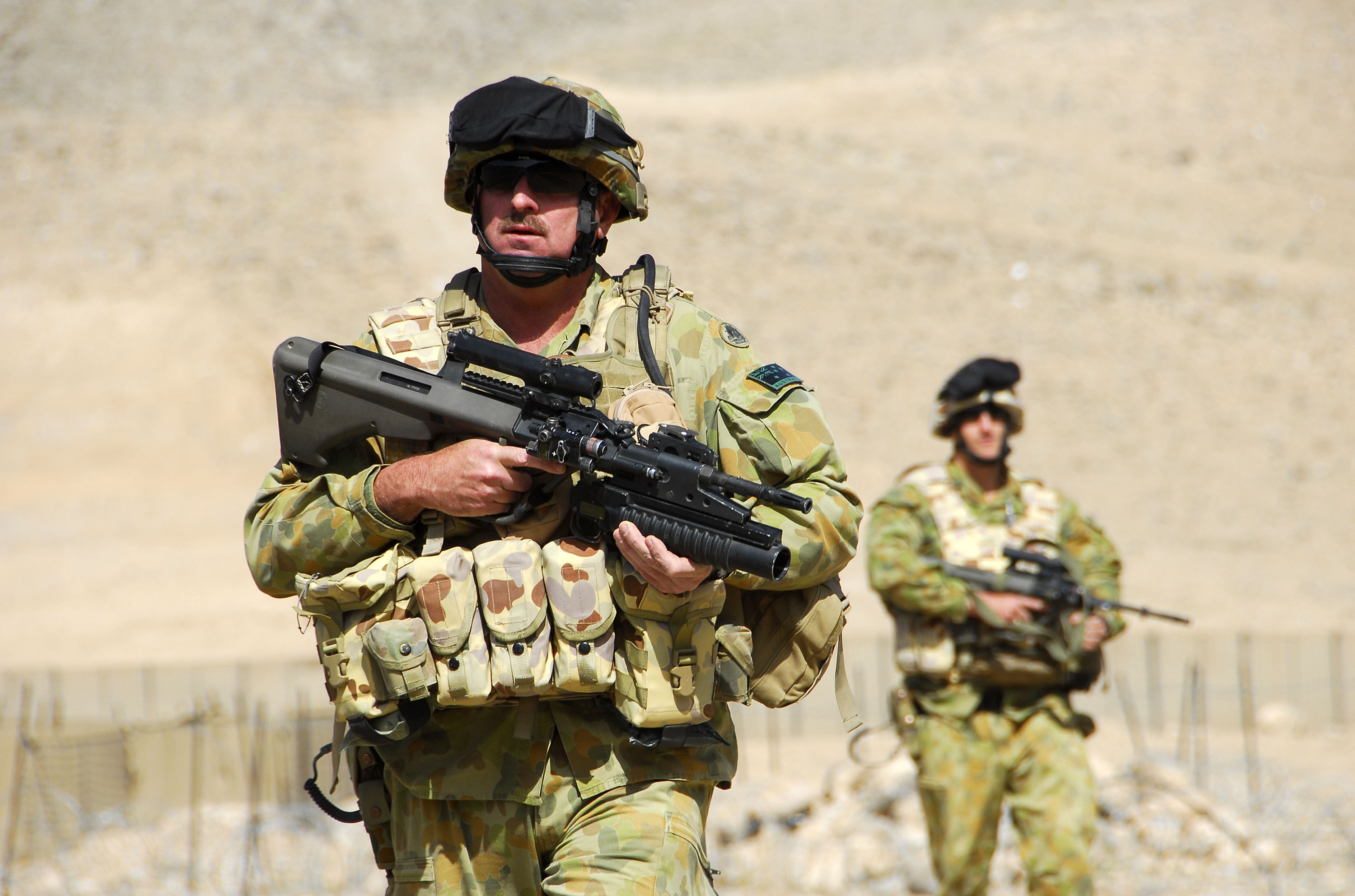
Australian soldiers on patrol with an F88 Austeyr fitted with an M203 grenade launcher

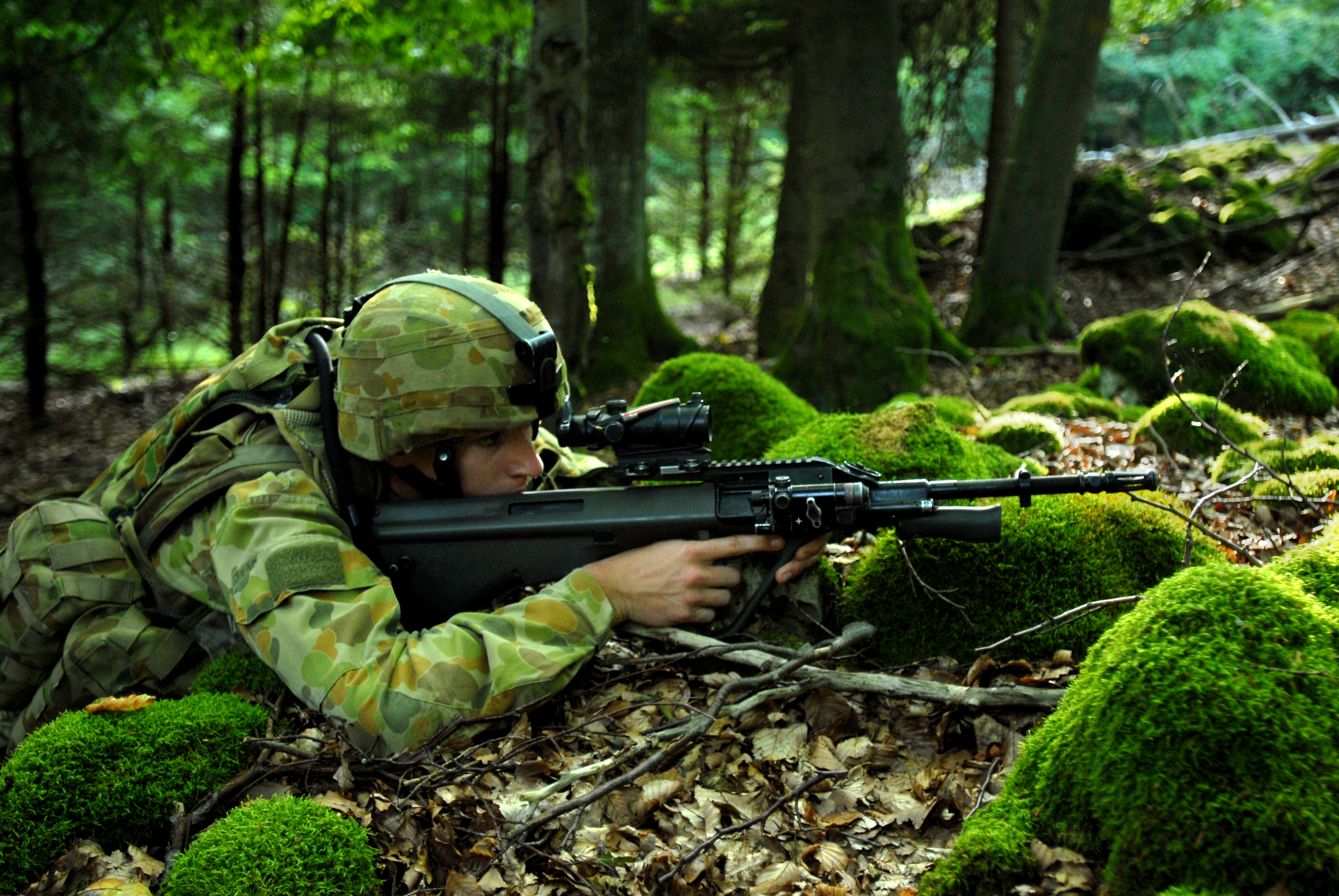
Australian soldier with an F88A1 Austeyr

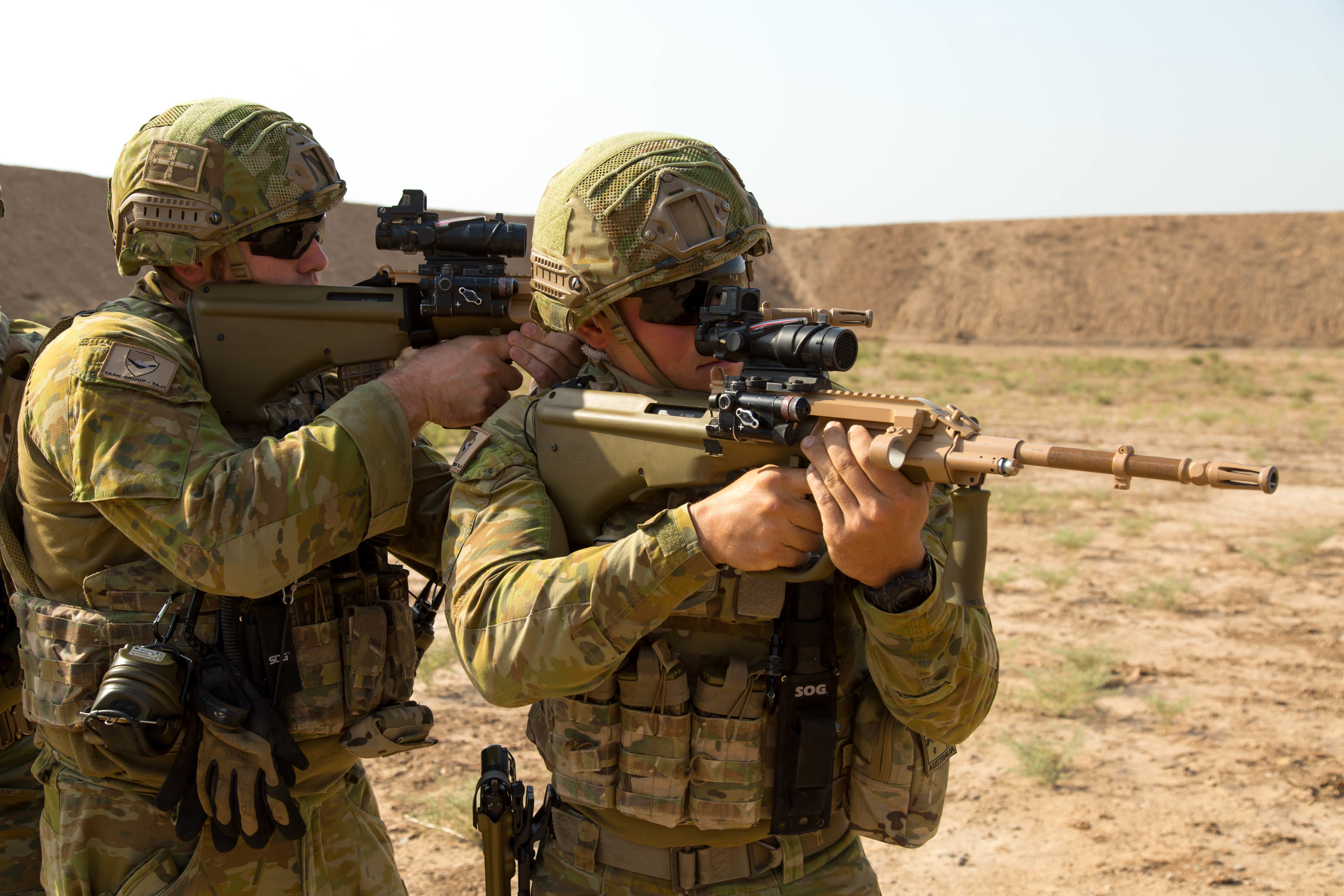
Australian soldiers with an F88SA2 Austeyr

In 1985, the ADF ordered 67,000 F88 Austeyrs that were manufactured by Australian Defence Industries (now Thales Australia) at their Lithgow Small Arms Factory under licence from Steyr Mannlicher AG.

- The F88 Austeyr was the standard-issue rifle that had a barrel length of 508 mm (20 in).
- The F88C Austeyr was the carbine variant of the F88 Austeyr that featured a shorter 407 mm (16 in) barrel and was without a bayonet lug. The F88C was issued to armoured, helicopter and parachute units.
- The F88T Austeyr is a .22 Long Rifle training rifle that entered service in 1999. The F88T was issued to infantry units, training units and to the Australian Army Cadets.
- The F88S (Special) Austeyr was a variant of the F88 Austeyr that entered service in 1993 with an Accuracy International Mounting System (AIMS) to allow the attachment of a different sighting device.
- The F88SA1 Austeyr was an upgrade of the F88 Austeyr that entered service in 2003. The F88SA1 had an integrated Picatinny rail in place of the standard optical sight. The rail enabled the fitting of the Elcan Wildcat sight, an AN/PVS-4 night vision sight and a night aiming device. The F88S was withdrawn from service.
- The F88SA1C Austeyr was the carbine variant of the F88SA1 Austeyr that had a barrel length of 407 mm (16 in).
- The F88SA2 Austeyr was an upgrade of the F88 Austeyr that entered service in 2009, issued to units serving in the war in Afghanistan. It was withdrawn due to issues and re-entered service in the end of 2010. The rifle had a two-tone colour with a "dark khaki undercarriage and a light brown upper" to match the Disruptive Pattern Desert Uniform. Design improvements included a modified gas system for increased reliability, an enlarged ejection port, a longer Picatinny Rail on top of the rifle, a modified sight housing and a side rail mount for a torch and Night Aiming Device (NAD). The F1A1 ammunition was improved to suit the F88SA2. The rifle could be fitted with a standard 1.5× sight or the Trijicon Advanced Combat Optical Gunsight (ACOG).

F88 Austeyrs that were fitted with the M203 grenade launcher from the M16A1 had a barrel length of 620 mm (24.4 in). In 2001, the Grenade Launcher Attachment (GLA) replaced the M203 from the M16A1 and also the M79 grenade launcher. The ADF ordered 3167 GLAs. The GLA featured an Inter-bar (armourer attached) interface, a RM Equipment M203PI grenade launcher, and a Knight's Armament quadrant sight assembly to which a Firepoint red dot sight was attached. The bayonet lug and forward vertical grip were removed to fit the Inter-bar.

The Advanced Individual Combat Weapon (AICW) developed by the Defence Science and Technology Organisation, Tenix Defence Systems, ADI, NICO and Metal Storm was an experimental F88 Austeyr that incorporated a top barrel for Metal Storm 30 mm rounds.

==== EF88 Austeyr ====
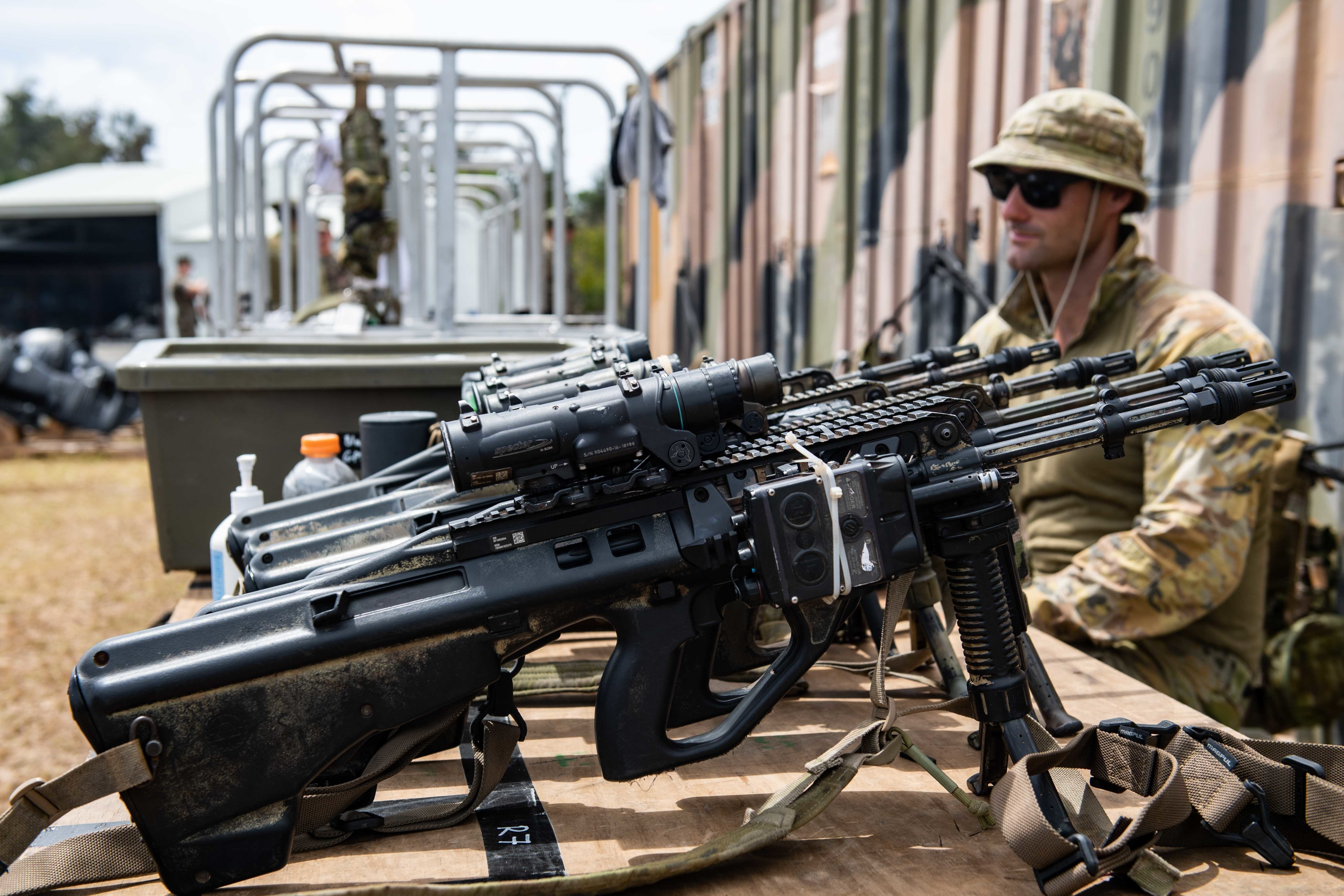
EF88 Austeyr displayed during RIMPAC in 2022

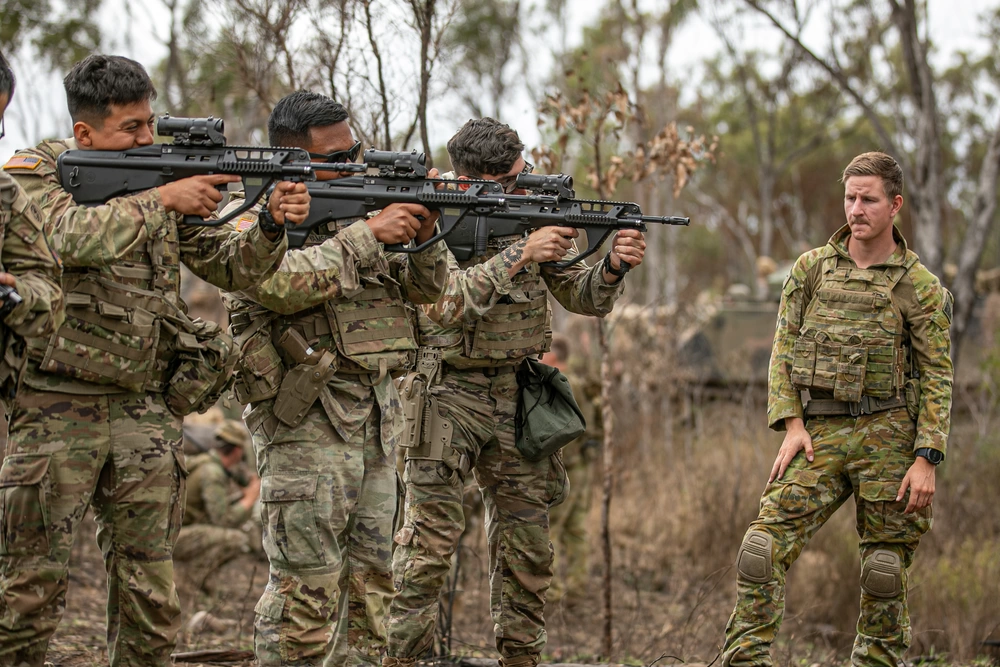
US Army soldiers with EF88C Austeyr

The EF88 (Enhanced F88) was developed by Thales Australia for the Australian Defence Force under Project LAND 125 Phase 3C to replace the F88 Austeyr. Thales Australia offers an export variant of the EF88, designated as the F90.

The EF88 is produced at Thales Australia's Lithgow Arms factory. The contract to develop an improved lighter version of the F88 Austeyr was signed with Thales Australia in December 2011. In September 2014, Thales Australia was awarded a low rate initial production contract after achieving provisional design acceptance. In June 2015, EF88s from the low rate initial production were issued to the Army infantry battalion 1 RAR to trial before the anticipated rollout of the EF88 in 2016. In July 2015, the ADF placed an initial order of 30,000 rifles in two versions: a standard rifle with a 20 in (508 mm) barrel and a carbine with a 16 in (406 mm) barrel.

In July 2020, a second order was placed for an additional 8,500 rifles. Internally and externally the EF88 is still similar to the Steyr AUG, although it has received many distinctive upgrades and changes. The colour that was chosen was a black-finish compared to the two-tone colour with a "dark khaki undercarriage and a light brown upper" finish of the F88A2s.

Upgrades include the following:

- Longer NATO STANAG top rail with a NATO STANAG bottom rail and side rail
- A fixed lighter fluted barrel
- Folding cocking handle
- Extended ejection port with recessed covers
- Enhanced buttstock profile and improved cheek weld design
- Bolt-release catch on buttstock for faster magazine changes
- Elcan Spectre DR 1-4× enhanced day sight

Thales tested two grenade launchers for the EF88, the Madritsch ML40AUS designed specifically for the EF88 and the Steyr SL40. In January 2014, Thales selected the Steyr SL40 for the EF88, and the ML40AUS reportedly had "significant" engineering concerns. The ADF ordered 2,277 SL40s. The SL40 is mounted on the EF88's bottom accessory rail and its trigger protrudes inside the rifle's trigger guard, and uses a Trijicon holographic sight for its sighting system. The SL40 is based on the Steyr GL40 grenade launcher, it weighs 1.025 kg (2.26 lb) and has a 180 mm (7.1 in) barrel length. The SL40 does not require a tool to attach it or remove it from the rifle.

Within the Australian Defence Force, there has been some discussion about the suitability of the EF88 when compared against variants of the AR-15 platform such as the M4 carbine and SIG MCX.

The Army acquired more than 500 suppressors for the EF88 that were manufactured by Oceania Defence for regular infantry battalions which were rolled out from May 2021.

In November 2021, Defence Technology Review reported that Thales Australia, in collaboration with the Australian Army, were developing a next-generation individual rifle in bullpup configuration chambered for the 6.8x51mm/.277 Fury calibre. In 2025, Defence Technology Review reported that the development of the weapon had been cancelled.

==== F90 ====
In June 2012, Thales debuted the F90 at the Eurosatory military exhibition in Paris. Besides the designation, the F90 is otherwise identical to the EF88. Lithgow Arms offers the F90 in three different barrel lengths: 360 mm (14.2 in), 407 mm (16 in), and 508 mm (20 in). The barrels are fixed cold hammer forged, chrome lined and fluted, and the receiver has heat-vent cut outs for better heat ventilation.It can also be outfitted with the SL40 grenade launcher, and its nominal cyclic rate of fire is 740 rounds per minute.

In 2015, Dasan Manufacturing was granted the rights to manufacture the F90, in an effort to bid them to the South Korean military for future replacements of the Daewoo K2. It is marketed by Dasan as the DSR-90.

At the Defexpo 2018 convention, MKU gained Indian licensing rights to manufacture the F90 for Indian contracts. In April 2019, the F90CQB variant was planned to be submitted in conjunction with the Kalyani Group for Indian Army requirements on a 5.56 mm NATO carbine. As of April 2020, Bharat Forge is Thales' partner to manufacture the F90. BF will market it to Indian military and law enforcement, and for potential export sales.

In 2016, The Firearm Blog reported that a semi-automatic variant of the F90, the Atrax, would be available to the US civilian market. In 2018, The Firearm Blog reported that Dasan USA had commenced producing components for the Atrax. In 2019, The Firearm Blog reported that Thales had cancelled the rifle for "ethical reasons".

In March 2018, Thales Australia introduced the F90MBR (Modular Bullpup Rifle). It is a successor to the F90, being similarly marketed for export. It features a redesigned receiver, incorporating STANAG magazine compatibility and an ambidextrous bolt catch and forward magazine release.

=== Irish adopted variants ===
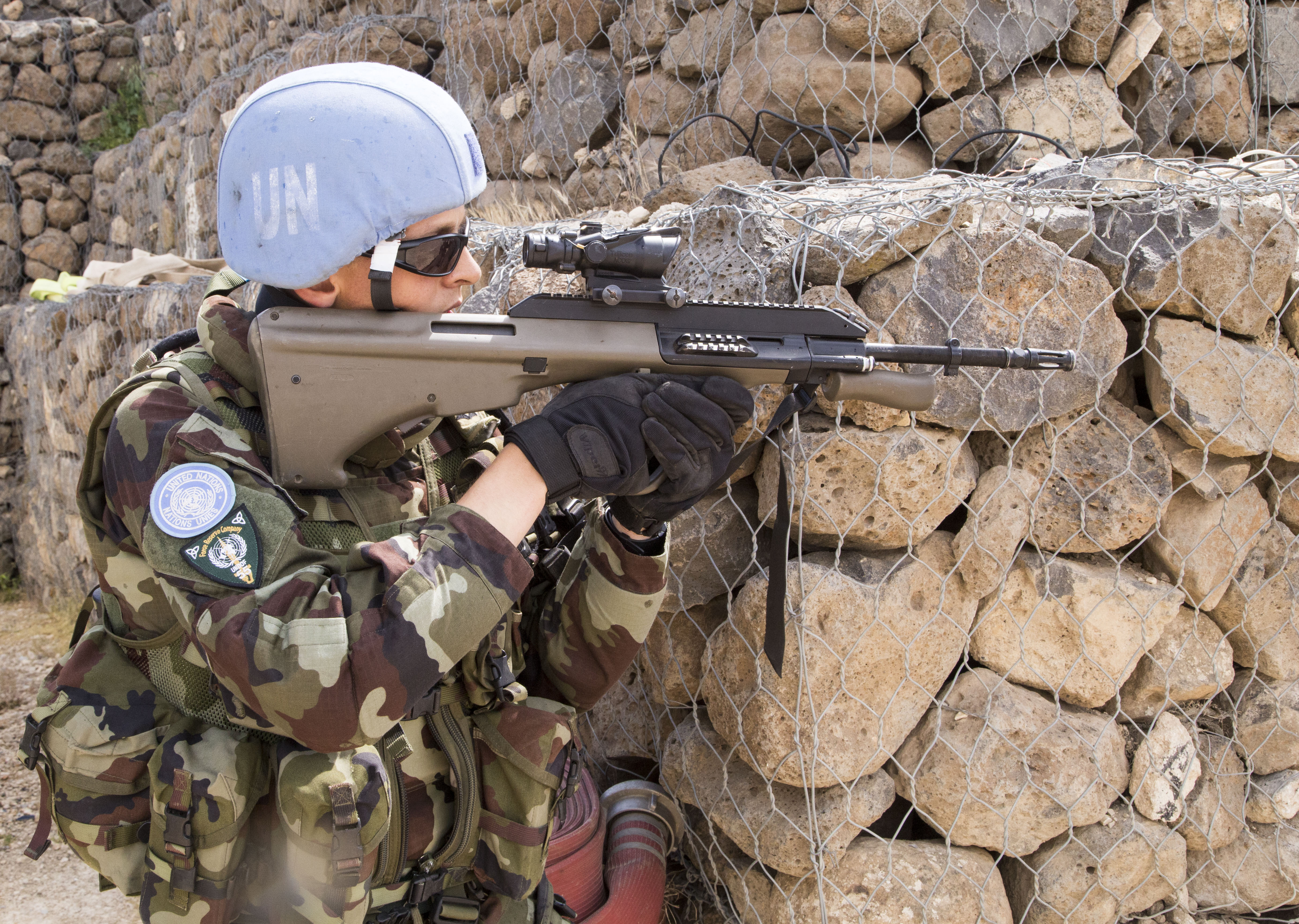
Irish soldier with an AUG Mod 14 during a UNDOF deployment

The Steyr AUG A1 entered service with the Irish Defence Forces in 1988.

In 2014, the Irish Army began a modernisation programme to upgrade their Steyr AUG A1s, which was possible due to the modularity of the AUG. The result was the Steyr AUG Mod 14, and on the same year the army began issuing the rifle to its operational units.

They replaced the original A1 housing/receiver group (with 1.5× optical sight) with an A3 housing/receiver group (with a Picatinny rail on top and right side) allowing a modern optical sight to be fitted. The Trijicon ACOG 4× sight was selected as the new optical sight of the rifle. The rifle features the ALO "automatic lockout" trigger, which can also be found in the Australian and New Zealand variants.

=== New Zealand adopted variants ===
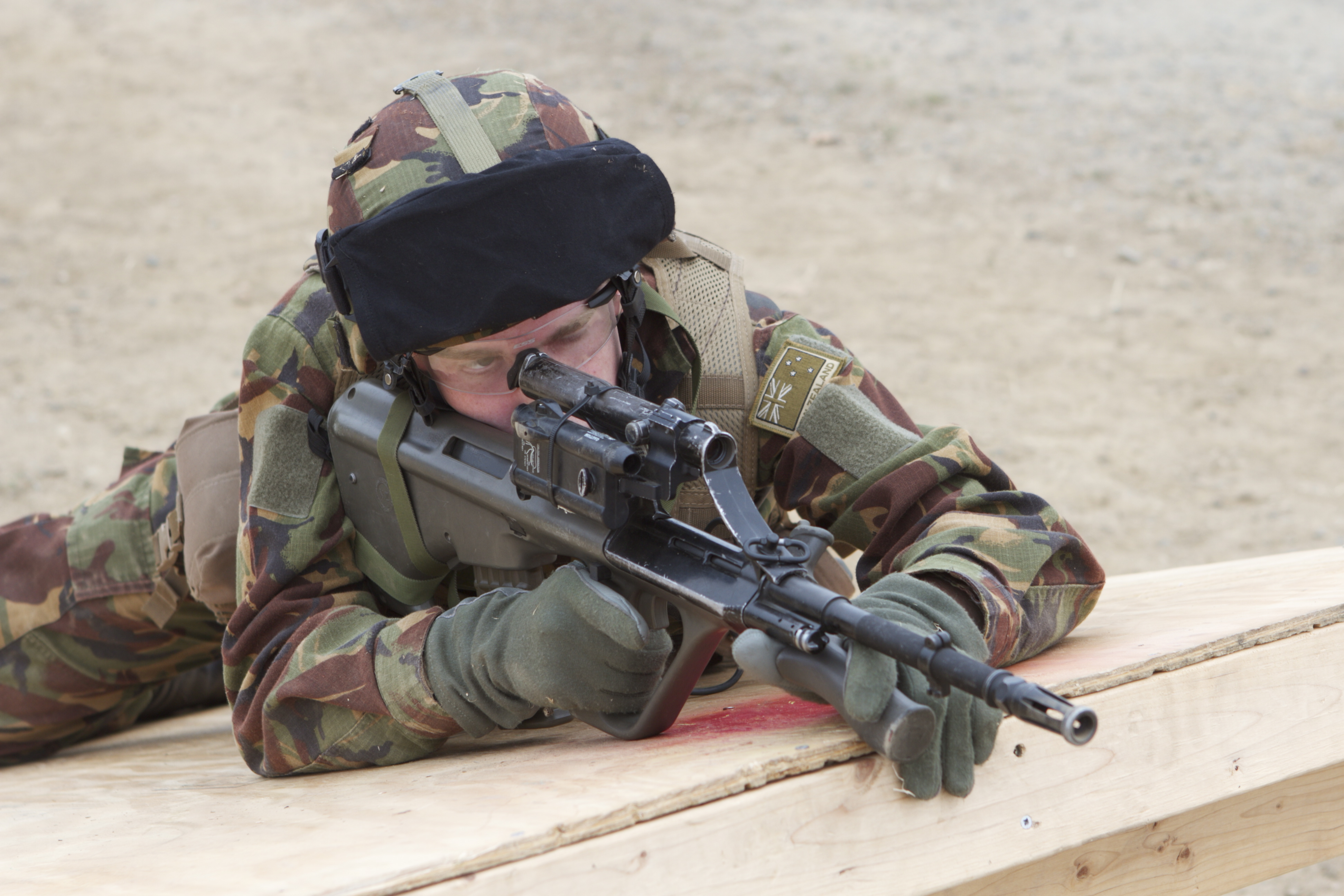
New Zealand Army with the IW Steyr on a military scenario-driven exercise

The New Zealand Defence Force adopted the AUG A1 model, designated Individual Weapon, Steyr (IW Steyr) as its primary individual rifle. 5,000 Austrian made rifles entered service in 1988, later supplemented by a further 15,000 manufactured in Australia by ADI. In 2013, Stuff reported that New Zealand had 13,000 IW Steyrs. In 2015, New Zealand selected the Lewis Machine and Tool Mars-L 5.56mm rifle to replace the IW Steyr and began transitioning to the new rifle in 2017.

The variants of the New Zealand IW Steyr were equipped with a progressive trigger (without full-auto lock-out tab as seen on F88 models) and a three-position safety. The sight added a crosshair to the circle reticule. New Zealand issued both factory and locally modified carbines alongside the full-length rifle variant.

=== Civilian variants ===
- The Steyr AUG P is a semi-automatic only variant of the AUG A1 available to the civilian and law enforcement markets. It features the carbine length, 407 mm (16 in) barrel and a modified bolt, carrier and trigger assembly that will only allow semi-automatic fire. The AUG P also has a slightly different optical sight that features a reticule with a fine dot in the centre of the aiming circle, allowing for more precise aiming.
- The Steyr AUG P Special Receiver is similar to the AUG P but features a STANAG scope mount system on top of the receiver.
- The Steyr AUG SA is a semi-automatic only variant of the AUG A1, built for civilian use and import to the US before being banned from importation in 1989.
- The Steyr AUG Z is a semi-automatic only variant in compliance with Austrian weapon laws, somewhat similar to the AUG A2 but lacking the quick detachable barrels and is unable to accept the trigger group from the assault rifles. It is intended primarily for civilian use.
- The Steyr AUG Z Sport is a semi-automatic only variant, somewhat similar to the AUG Z, for use in sport shooting approved by the BKA in Germany. This variant has a special handguard without the typical front grip.
- The Steyr AUG Z SP was a straight pull only configuration, somewhat similar to the AUG Z, and was intended primarily for civilian use; it was sold only in the United Kingdom.
- The Steyr AUG Z A3 is a semi-automatic only variant of the AUG Z similar to the AUG A3 introduced in 2010.
- The Steyr AUG Z A3 9mm is a semi-automatic only 9×19mm Parabellum variant of the AUG Z A3.
- The Steyr AUG Z A3 SE is a semi-automatic only variant of the AUG Z similar to the AUG A3 SF.
- The Steyr USR is an AUG A2 modified to meet the former Federal Assault Weapons Ban (AWB) (or Public Safety and Recreational Firearms Use Protection Act) regulations. The USR has a thumb hole stock molded in gray polymer. The barrel is made by GSI Inc and is a 20" bull barrel. It lacks a threaded muzzle and therefore has no muzzle device. The barrel takedown button has been cut off.
- The Steyr AUG A3 SA USA is a semi-automatic only variant of the AUG A3 with a 407 mm (16.0 in) barrel, made available for the U.S. civilian market in April 2009.
- The Steyr AUG A3 SA NATO: is a semi-automatic only variant similar to the AUG A3 SA USA, but uses a right-hand-only, NATO STANAG magazine stock assembly.
- The Steyr AUG A3 M1 is a semi-automatic only variant of the AUG A3 SF with a detachable optical sight which can be replaced with Picatinny rails and a 416 mm (16.4 in) barrel length, manufactured in the US by Steyr Arms US since October 2014.
- The Steyr AUG A3 M2 is a semi-automatic only variant of the AUG A3 with an extended Picatinny rail and a 416 mm (16.4 in) barrel length. It reverted to the A1 style charging handle with a push-button forward assist and an added slot to lock it in the forward position. It was designed to accommodate an M-LOK handguard manufactured by Steyr. It has been manufactured in the US by Steyr Arms US since April 2024.

=== AUG clones ===
- The STG-556 was introduced at the 2007 SHOT Show, it was manufactured by Microtech Small Arms Research Inc. (a subsidiary of Microtech Knives) an AUG A1 clone significantly re-engineered in its working system and principle as it features a bolt hold-open device as seen on the M16 rifle; otherwise the MSAR STG-556 retains the original AUG features, such as feeding from proprietary translucent plastic magazines and having the quick-change barrel option. The STG-556 can be converted from either having a telescopic sight or a Picatinny rail. It is available in either civilian (semi-automatic only) configuration, and military and law enforcement (selective fire) configuration.
- The AXR was revealed at the 2007 SHOT Show, manufactured by Tactical Products Design Inc. as an AUG A2 clone capable of semi-automatic only fire, aimed for both the civilian and law enforcement markets, and fed by STANAG magazines; the manufacturer sells clear plastic magazines which are STANAG 4179 compliant and will readily fit in any rifle with a compatible magazine catch. The rifle does not have the integral scope, allowing users to use any kind of scopes or laser sights on the Picatinny rail.
- The Oberland Arms OA-UG is a German clone of the AUG intended for use in Germany in civilian sales.
- The Type 68 is a Taiwanese copy of the AUG with notable differences including a smaller trigger guard and the use of iron sights instead of the original's telescopic sight (although optical sights can still be optionally mounted on the carrying handle). Developed as a potential alternative to the T65 assault rifle and (in the form of a heavy-barrel variant) replacement to the Type 57A assault rifle, it ultimately did not enter service after the ROC military decided to adopt the Minimi and T75 as their future light machine gun.

== Conflicts ==
The Steyr AUG has been used in the following conflicts:

- Gulf War
- Somali Civil War (by Unified Task Force, 1993)
- Kosovo war
- May 1998 Indonesia riots
- 1999 and 2006 East Timorese crises
- Militias-Comando Vermelho Conflict
- Syrian Civil War
- War in Iraq
- Papua conflict
- Russian invasion of Ukraine

== Users ==
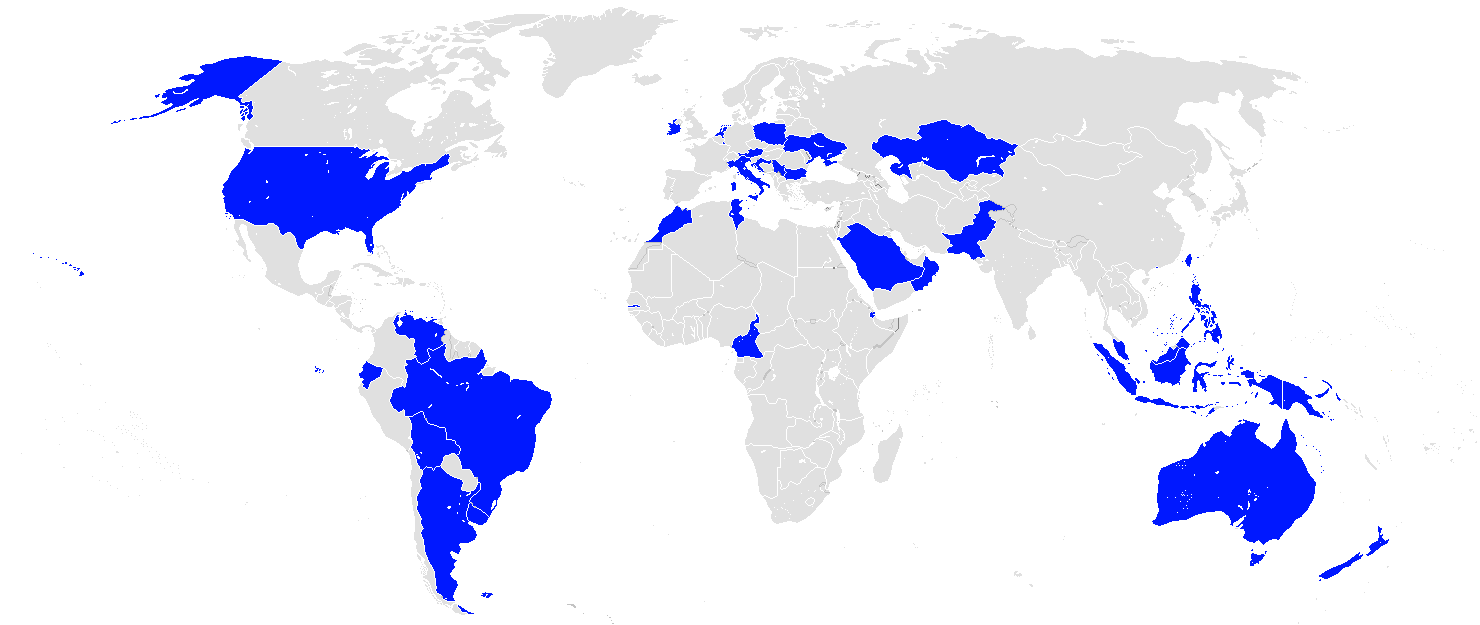
Map of Steyr AUG operators

=== Military ===
- Algeria: Special Intervention Detachment
- Argentina: Argentine Armed Forces.
- Australia: The F88 Austeyr variant, is the standard service rifle of the Australian Defence Force. It is manufactured, under licence from Steyr-Mannlicher, by Thales Australia. The F88 Austeyr entered service in January 1989, replacing both the M16A1 and the L1A1 Self Loading Rifle used by the Australian Army. The first regular unit to be issued with the F88 Austeyr was 6 RAR, which received them in January 1989.
- Austria: Standard issued rifle of the Bundesheer, serving as the Steyr AUG A1 / (StG77 A1) in official army nomenclature.
- Bangladesh
- Bolivia
- Central African Republic
- Croatia: Used by the Croatian Special Forces.
- Djibouti
- Ecuador
- Gambia
- Indonesia: Used by Komando Pasukan Katak (Kopaska) tactical diver group and Komando Pasukan Khusus (Kopassus) special forces group.
- Ireland: Standard service rifle of the Irish Defence Forces. The Army Ranger Wing special forces uses the Steyr AUG A2 and A3.
- Italy: Carabinieri Special Forces: Gruppo di Intervento Speciale and 1st "Tuscania" Regiment
- Luxembourg: Standard infantry rifle of the Luxembourg Army. The HBAR variant is also employed as the section support automatic rifle.
- Malaysia: Made under licence from Steyr by SME Ordnance. Local production of the AUG rifle series started in 1991 with a joint production with Steyr that started in 2004. Lawsuits from Steyr emerged when Malaysia decided to withdraw from joint production.
- Moldova
- Morocco
- Montenegro: Used by the Special Forces Company of the Armed Forces of Montenegro.
- Oman
- Pakistan
- Papua New Guinea: F88 variant.
- Philippines: Used by the Scout Rangers.
- Poland: JW Grom special forces group.
- Romania: Used by the Romanian Special Forces
- Saudi Arabia
- Serbia: 72nd Reconnaissance-Commando Battalion.
- Syria: Originally from opposition forces.
- Taiwan Type 68 copy
- Tunisia: The Steyr AUG has been the primary rifle of the Tunisian Army since 1978. The first regular unit to be issued with the AUG A1 was the GTS. Subsequently, the leadership began arming the National Guard with Sturmgewehr 58 (FN FAL) and the army with the AUG A1/A2/A3 variants, including the Army's Special Forces.
- Sri Lanka:used by Sri Lanka Marine Corps and Sri Lanka Army Special Forces Regiment
- Turkey: Maroon Berets.
- Ukraine: AUG HBAR is used by the Sokil Special Forces.
- Uruguay: Received 15,000 Steyr AUG A2UR bullpup assault rifles (with the 1.5× telescopic sight) to be used by the Uruguayan infantry battalions.

=== Law enforcement ===
- Austria: Used by EKO Cobra.
- Belgium: Steyr AUG 9mm is used by the Federal Police.
- Brazil: In use by Agência Brasileira de Inteligência since November 2011. SMG version adopted by São Paulo Police in .40 S&W.
- Bulgaria: SOBT (counter-terrorist unit) only.
- Czech Republic: Steyr AUG Carbine in 9×19mm Parabellum used as standard SMG of the Czech police in some regions (e.g. Central Bohemian Region).
- Germany:
  - : Bavarian SEK.
- Indonesia: Used by the Mobile Brigade Corps (Brimob) special forces group of the Indonesian National Police, including Detachment 88 counter-terrorist unit.
- Luxembourg: The Unité Spéciale de la Police intervention unit of the Grand Ducal Police employs the AUG A2 variant.
- Malaysia: Used by 69 Commando of Pasukan Gerakan Khas counter-terrorist unit of the Royal Malaysia Police.
- Timor Leste: National Police of East Timor
- Turkey: Police Special Operations Department.
- Venezuela: Used by SEBIN.

=== Non-state users ===
- Hamas: used by the Al-Qassam Brigades.
- Houthi Rebels
- Islamic State: used by the Military of IS.
- West Papua Liberation Army: Likely captured or bought from Indonesian forces.

=== Former users ===
- Australia: Formerly used by the Victoria Police Special Operations Group, replaced by the M4 Carbine in the 2000s.
- Ba'athist Syria: until 2024.
- West Germany: - ( Bavarian) SEK.
- New Zealand: Used from 1988 until 2019. The first 5,000 rifles delivered were manufactured in Austria by Steyr Daimler Puch. Latter versions were the Australian ADI-made Austeyr F88 variant, locally designated IW Steyr (Individual Weapon Steyr.) From August 2015, the MARS-L started to replace the Steyr AUG.
- United Kingdom
  - Gloucestershire Constabulary Armed Response Unit
  - Falkland Islands: Falkland Islands Defence Force. Being replaced by the L85A2.
- United States: U.S. Immigration and Customs Enforcement, replaced by the Colt M4.

== See also ==
- List of assault rifles
- List of bullpup firearms

== Bibliography ==
- Ezell, Edward Clinton (1993) [1983]. Small Arms of the World. Thomas M. Pegg, research assistance (12th rev. ed.). New York: Barnes & Noble. pp. 75–77. ISBN 978-0-88029-601-4.
