= STG-556 =

- Type: Assault rifle/Semi-automatic rifle
- Place of origin: United States / Austria

Production history
- Designer: Steyr Arms
- Manufacturer: Microtech Small Arms Research
- Produced: 2007-15
- No. built: 1000 (Limited edition STG-556); 232 (STG-556 rifles with an 18.5" heavy barrel); 500 (STG-556 Gebirgsjäger)
- Variants: See Variants

Specifications
- Mass: Empty: 3.62 kg (8.0 lb)
- Length: 26 in (660.4 mm); 27 in (685.8 mm); 31 in (787.4 mm)
- Barrel length: 14 in (355.6 mm); 16 in (406.4 mm); 18.5 in (469.9 mm) (only for .300 Blackout); 20 in (508.0 mm)
- Cartridge: 5.56×45mm NATO; .300 AAC Blackout; 6.8mm Remington SPC; 7.62×39mm; 5.45×39mm
- Action: Gas-operated, rotating bolt, short piston drive
- Feed system: 10/20/30/42-round detachable box magazine; 30-round magazine (7.62/5.45 variants); STANAG magazine (XM17-E4 only)
- Sights: 1.5x optical sight; Can have various scopes/sights installed via picatinny railing

The STG-556 is a Steyr AUG clone formerly manufactured by Microtech Small Arms Research (MSAR). It was available in civilian and military/law enforcement (select-fire) variants.

== History ==
It was introduced at the 2007 SHOT Show. The first few STG-556 rifles were chambered in .223 Caliber.

In July 2012, MSAR resurfaced with a new STG-556 rifle variant known as the STG-E4.

MSAR closed down permanently on March 20, 2015. No specific reasons were stated on their website, but it is well known that Steyr setting up a US based manufacturing arm, producing genuine Steyr AUG firearms, all but eliminated the need for anyone to buy a clone.

== Design ==
The STG-556's design was based on the original Steyr AUG since the patents expired at the time. The receiver was made from cast 7075-T6 aircraft-grade aluminum, unlike the TPD AXR, which was forged. It was available in black, tan and green finish.

It features a bolt release as seen on the M16 rifle and a forward assist. Otherwise, the STG-556 retains the features similar to the Steyr AUG, such as having the quick-change barrel option and the ability to change which side the weapon ejects from by changing the bolt out for a right or left side bolt respectively. The STG-556 has a right-side ejector.

When using a suppressor or low-pressure ammo, the gas regulator needs to be adjusted to allow more gas to be used to fire ammo. The gas regulator positions consist of "S", which is the normal setting and allows large amounts of gas to escape from the rifle. "H" diverts more gas into the rifle to allow the STG-556 to be fired in adverse conditions or extreme foulings. "GR" diverts gas into the system to fire blanks in order to launch rifle grenades.

The STG-556 uses a short-stroke gas piston. The rifle can be converted from either having a telescopic sight or a MIL-STD-1913 rail. Various accessories can be attached on the rail.

The STG-556 uses magazines similar to those used by the Steyr AUG (10/20/30/42), being made up of “radel” (polyphenylsulfone). The rifles can also take 30-round STANAG and Magpul PMAG magazines. The XM-17E4 variant can use STANAG magazines.

Most STG-556 rifles made in 2009 did not allow to use AUG-type magazines unless the three ribs on top were professionally filed off. All STG-556s without a forward-assist mechanism can take AUG magazines.

The barrel can accept a blank adapter or a suppressor.

== Variants ==
=== STG-556 Limited Edition ===
A limited edition STG-556, a clone of the Steyr AUG A3, had a production run of only 1,000 rifles. There was a limited production of 232 rifles produced with an 18.5" heavy barrel after tests proved that length provided optimum accuracy over the 24" length due to barrel harmonics.

=== STG-556 Gebirgsjäger ===
The STG-556 Gebirgsjäger had a production run of 500 rifles. It was named after the Gebirgsjäger, which means Mountain Huntsmen. It was previously sold with an OD green Currahee Knife and a MSAR Pelican 1700 case.

=== STG-556 E4 ===
The STG-556 E4 was introduced in 2009. It can use AR-15 and M16 magazines. For any E4s that use .300 AAC Blackout, they can use the 18.5" barrel.
