= De Bange 80 mm cannon =

De Bange 80mm Mle 1877 "Canon de campagne de 80 modèle 1877"
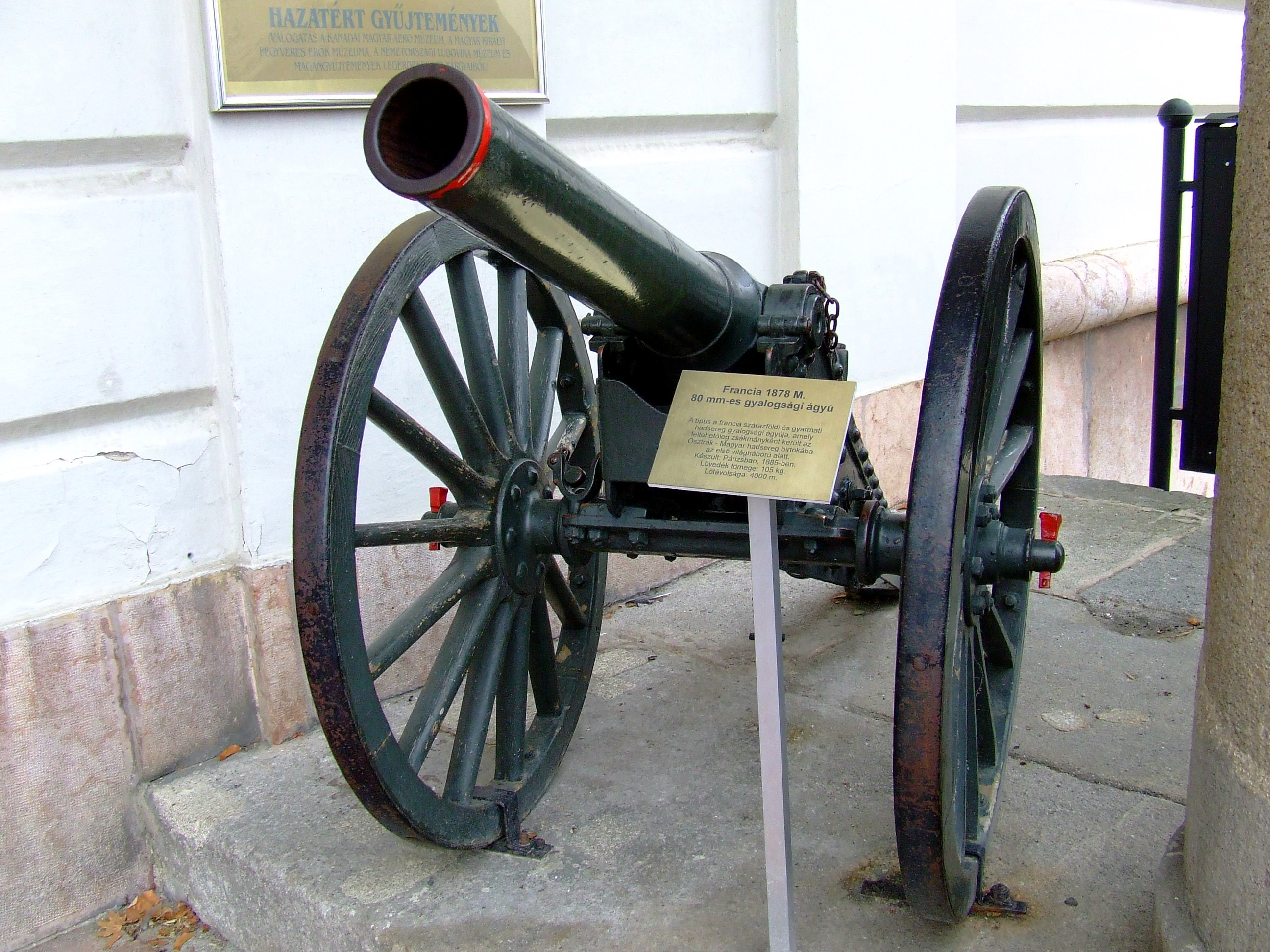
- A gun in the Museum of Military History, Budapest
- Type: Field gun
- Place of origin: France

Service history
- In service: 1879-1918
- Used by: France; Serbia
- Wars: See conflicts

Production history
- Designer: Charles Ragon de Bange
- Designed: 1877
- Manufacturer: Puteaux
- Produced: 1879

Specifications
- Mass: Firing: 955 kg (2,105 lb); Travel: 1,600 kg (3,500 lb)
- Barrel length: 2.08 m (6 ft 10 in) L/26
- Shell: Separate loading bagged charges and projectiles.
- Shell weight: 5.9 kg (13 lb)
- Caliber: 80 mm (3.1 in)
- Breech: de Bange
- Recoil: None
- Carriage: Box trail
- Elevation: -5° to +26°
- Rate of fire: 2 rpm
- Muzzle velocity: 525 m/s (1,720 ft/s)
- Maximum firing range: 7–8.7 km (4.3–5.4 mi)

The Canon de campagne de 80 modèle 1877 or De Bange 80mm cannon was a field artillery piece used by the French Army before and during World War I.

== History ==
It developed in France by Colonel Charles Ragon de Bange in 1877, and adopted by the French Army that same year. It superseded the earlier Reffye cannon (1870) and the Lahitolle 95mm cannon (1875). De Bange also manufactured another cannon of a rather similar size: the De Bange 90mm cannon.

The mle 1877 was breech loading and used the original mushroom-shaped obturator system developed by de Bange, allowing to properly seal the breech during each firing. The gun lacked a recoil mechanism, meaning that it moved backward at each firing, necessitating re-aiming every time, which considerably slowed the rate of firing. This would remain a problem with all artillery pieces until the development of the hydro-pneumatic recoil mechanism of the Canon de 75 in 1897.

The mle 1877 was designed to be used by horse artillery units and its light, simple and rugged construction meant it was often used as a colonial gun in France's colonial conflicts before World War I. During World War I a number of guns were modified by removing barrels from their carriage and placing them on a simple wooden garrison mount. The guns were then placed in reinforced dugouts where they rested on a simple wooden platform that rested on an earthen berm at a +30° angle with higher angles possible by stacking wooden wedges under the barrel. A 58 kg (128 lb), 75 kg (165 lb) or 105 kg (231 lb) demolition charge called a Lance Mines Gatard was loaded in the muzzle of the gun while a propelling charge was loaded in the breech. The Lance Mines Gatard was used to clear obstacles and destroy strong points in enemy trenches to a maximum range of 300 m (330 yd). So the modified mle 1877 became a type of spigot mortar.

== Gallery ==
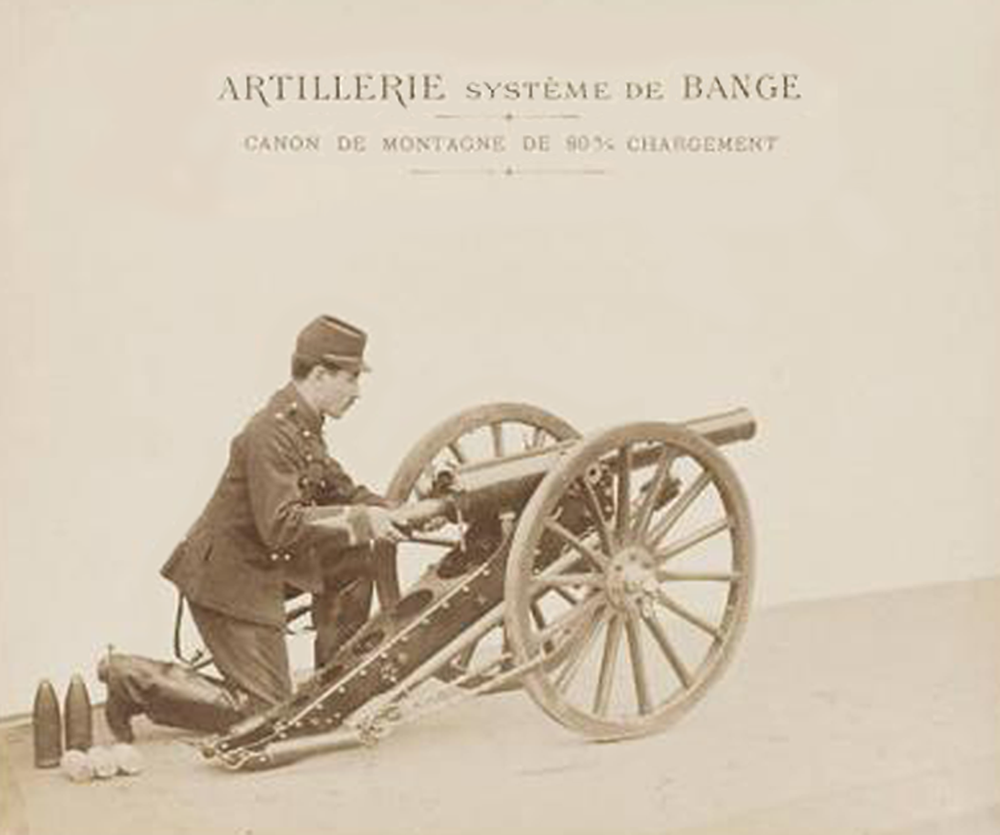
Loading a mle 1877

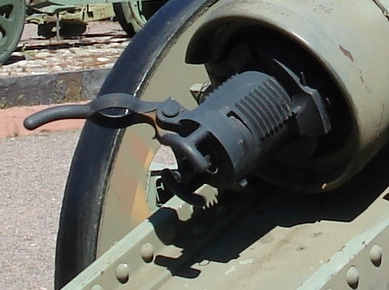
An open de Bange breech

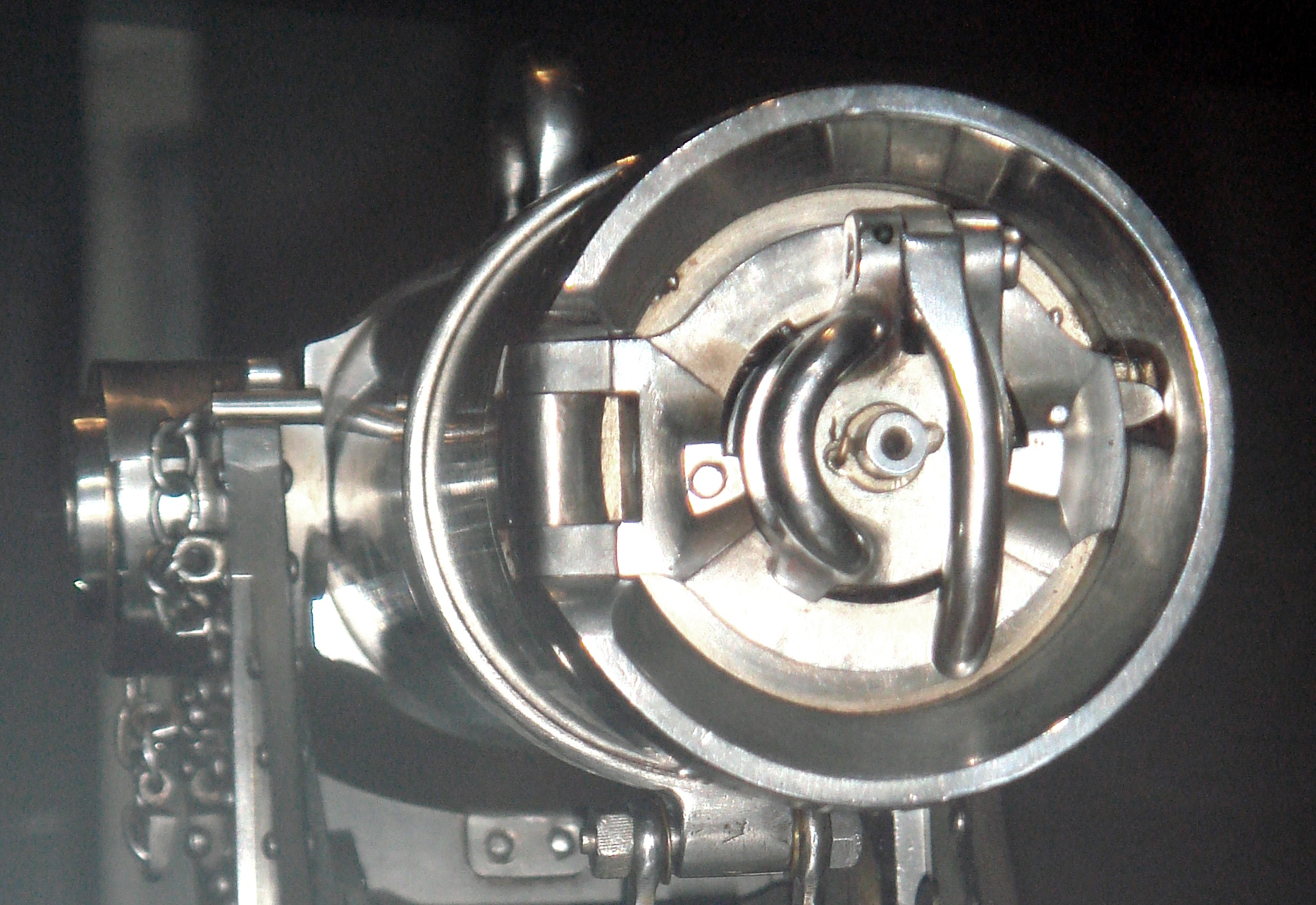
A closed de Bange breech

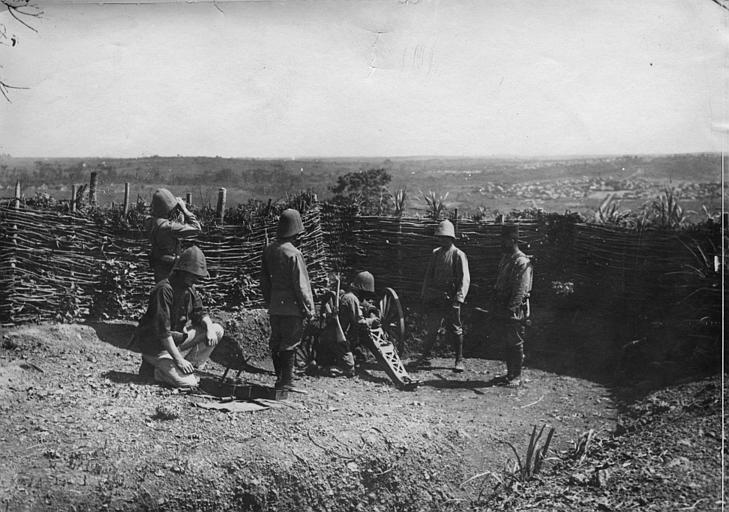
French colonial troops in Cameroon

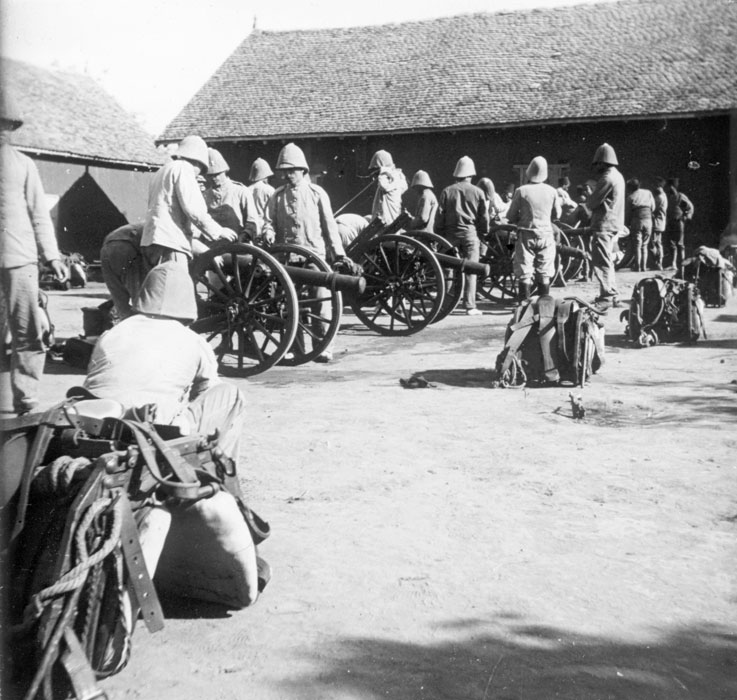
French colonial troops in Madagascar

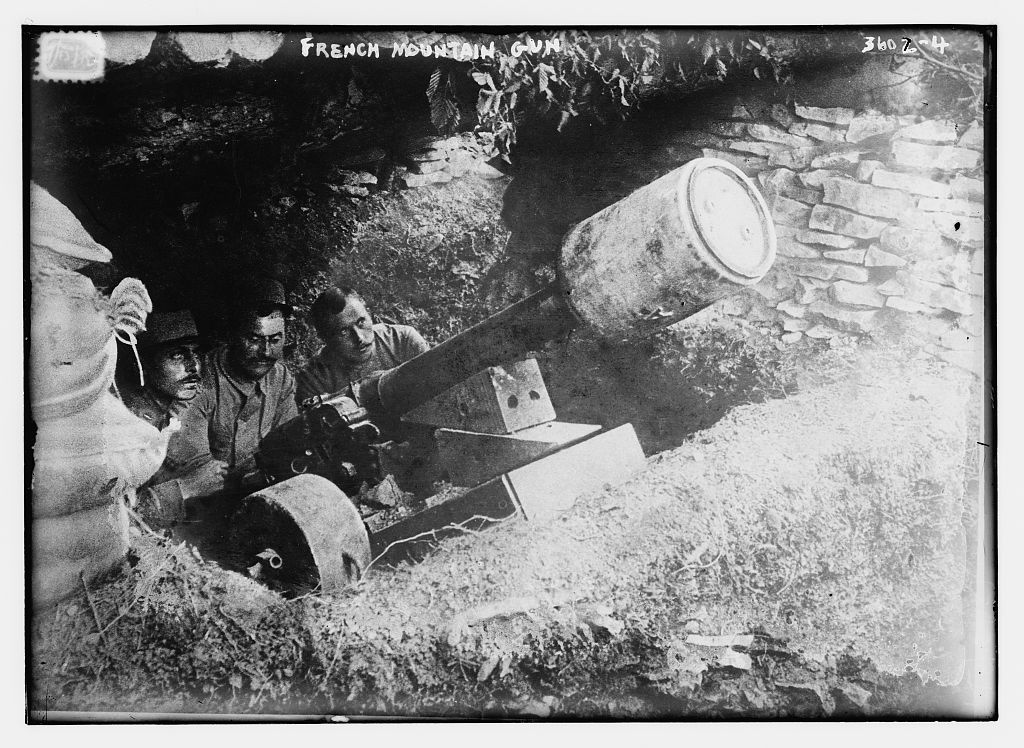
A Lance Mines Gatard in a reinforced dugout

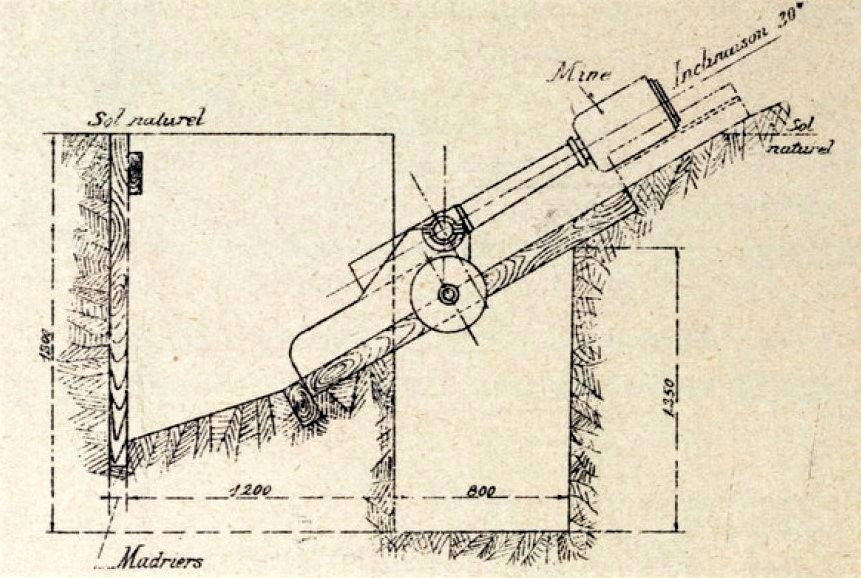
A diagram of the Lance Mines Gatard system

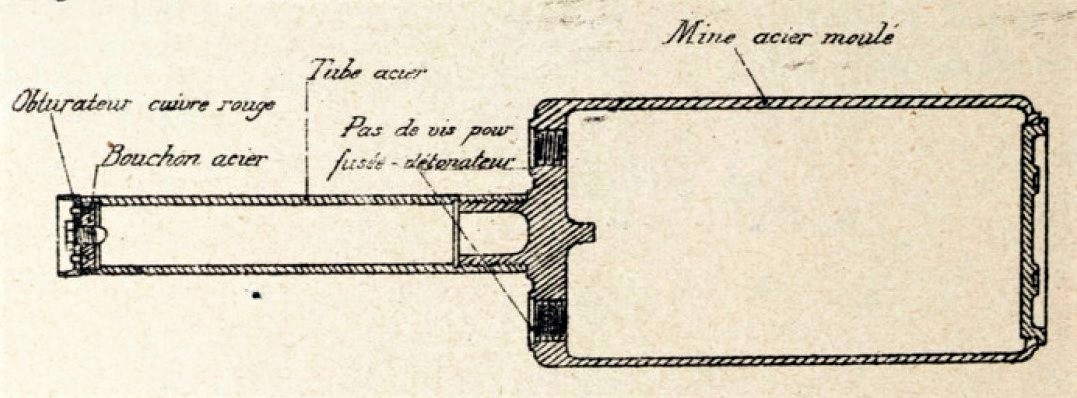
A diagram of the Gatard projectile

== Conflicts ==
- Mandingo Wars
- First Madagascar expedition
- Sino-French War
- Tonkin Campaign
- First Franco-Dahomean War
- Second Franco-Dahomean War
- 1893 Franco-Siamese crisis
- Second Madagascar expedition
- Boxer Rebellion
- 1904–1905 uprising in Madagascar
- Ouaddai War
- French conquest of Morocco
- Zaian War
- First World War
