= Reffye 75 mm cannon =

Canon de Reffye de 75 mm
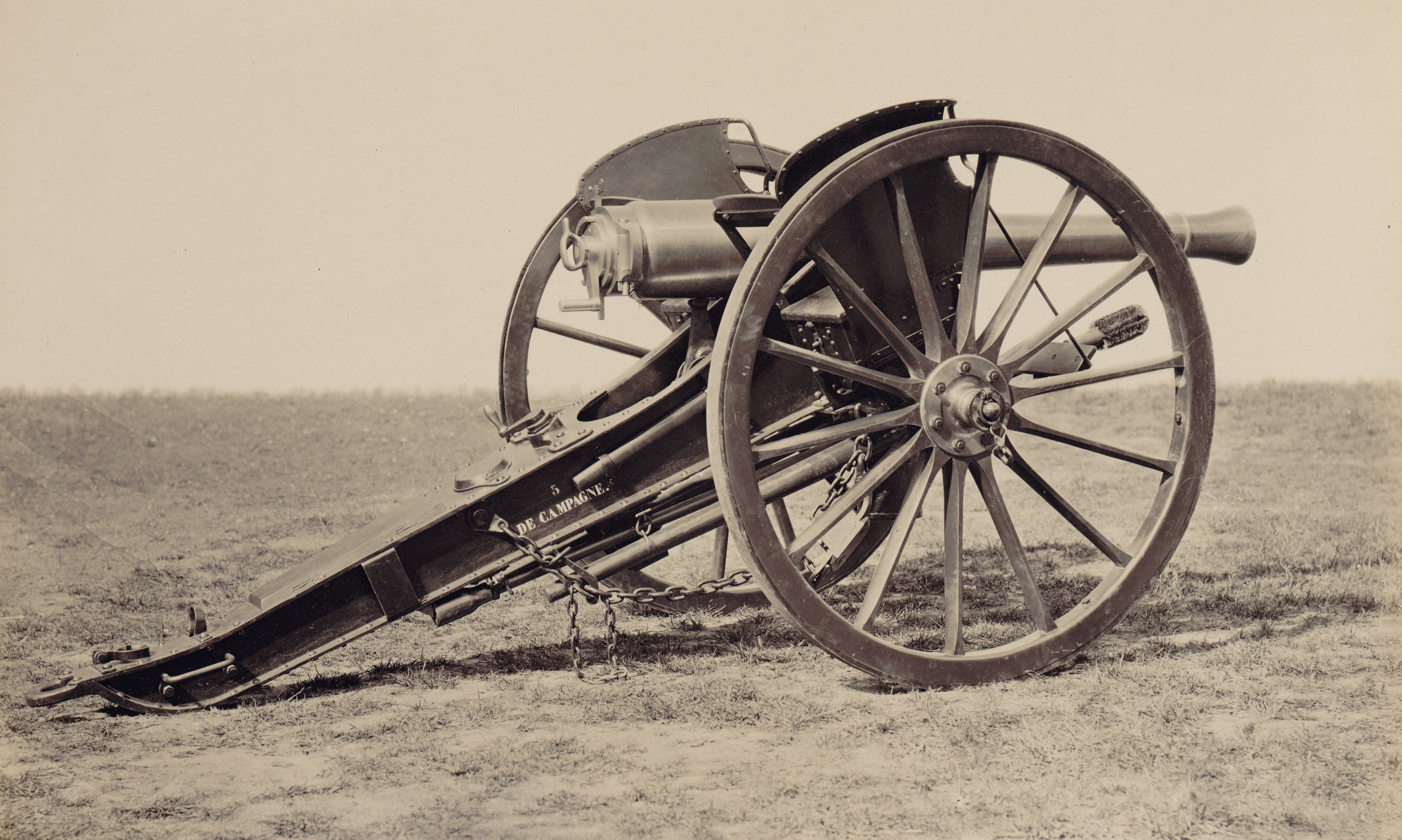
- Type: Field gun
- Place of origin: France

Service history
- In service: 1873–?
- Used by: France

Production history
- Designer: Jean-Baptiste Verchère de Reffye

Specifications
- Caliber: 75 mm

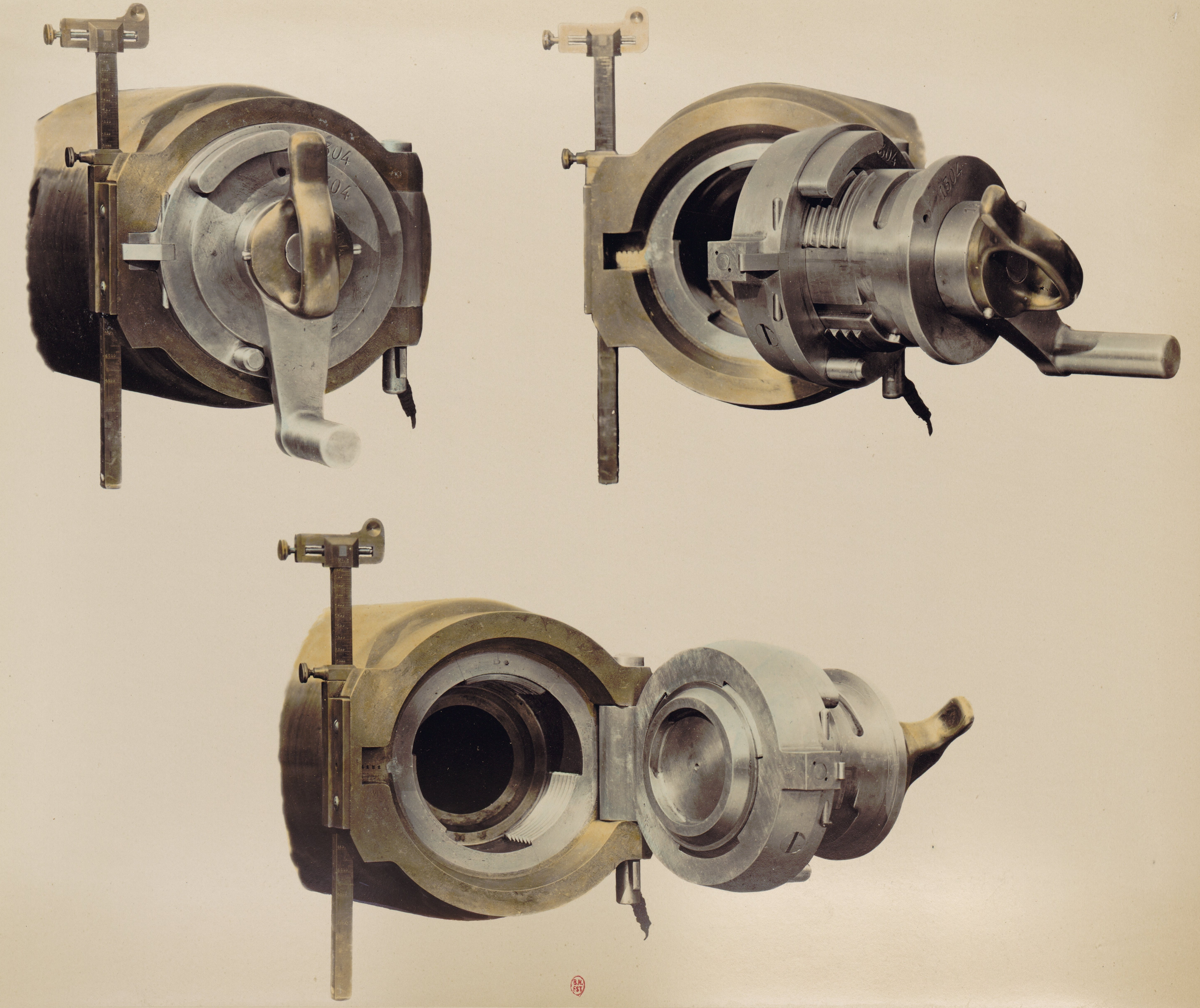
Reffye breech.

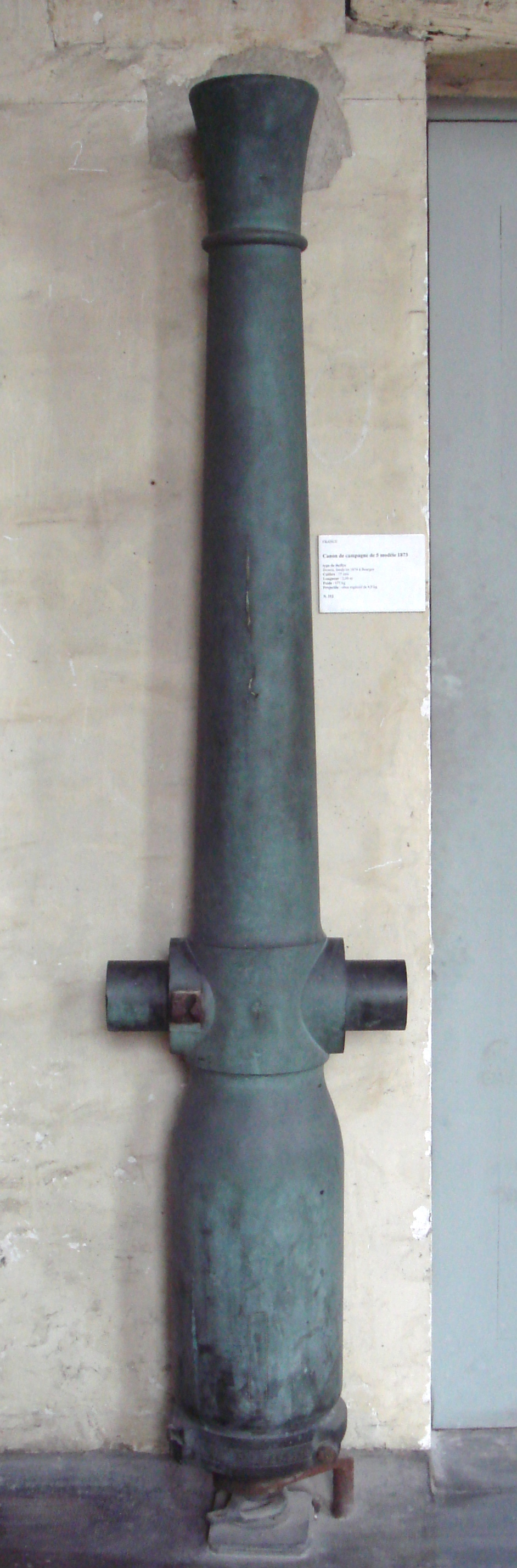
The 1873 Reffye 75mm cannon. Length: 2.00 m. Weight: 475 kg. Ammunition 4.9 kg shell.

The Reffye 75mm cannon (French: Canon de campagne de 5 de Reffye modèle 1873) was a French artillery piece of the 19th century, developed by the French artillery General Jean-Baptiste Verchère de Reffye, superintendent of the works at Meudon. The weapon was adopted by the French Army from 1873. It was a 75 mm rifled breech-loading cannon, equipped with a breech screw, initially made of bronze.

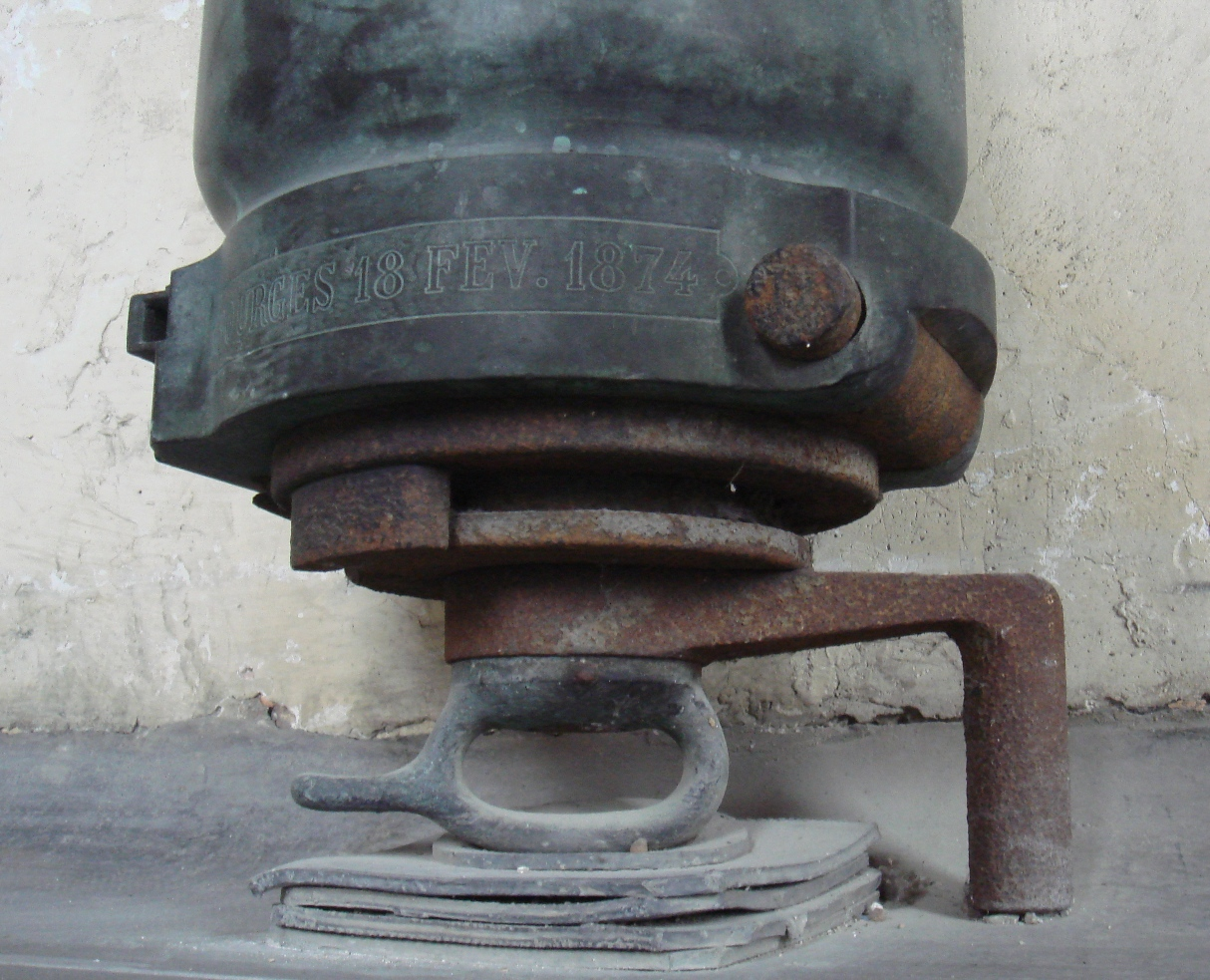
Screw breech of the Reffye 75mm cannon.

The sliding breech block, and the interrupted screw used for sealing were advanced features, but the perfect sealing of the breech would only be achieved with the invention of the de Bange obturator. The cannon used shell cartridges for ammunition. It would be soon superseded by the Lahitolle 95mm cannon (1875) and especially the De Bange 90mm cannon (1877).

De Reffye also developed the Reffye 85 mm cannon in 1870.

De Reffye also developed in 1866 a mitrailleuse (named Canon à balles), one of the best early volley guns, which was used during the Franco-Prussian War of 1870.
