= Verchere =

Verchere or Verchère is a surname. Notable people with the surname include:

- Graham Verchere (born 2002), Canadian actor
- Jean-Baptiste Verchère de Reffye (1821–1880), French artillery general
- Patrice Verchère (born 1973), French politician
