= Jean-Baptiste Verchère de Reffye =

French artillery general

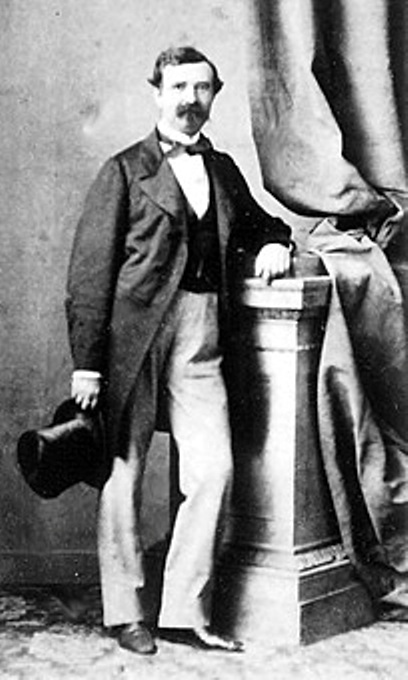
Jean Baptiste Auguste Verchère de Reffye

Jean-Baptiste Verchère de Reffye (French pronunciation: [ʒɑ̃ batist vɛʁʃɛʁ də ʁɛfi]; 30 July 1821 – 6 December 1880) was a French artillery general of the 19th century, and superintendent of the works at Meudon. He was a former ordnance officer for Napoleon III. He also established the gun manufacture in Tarbes.

== Reffye mitrailleuse ==
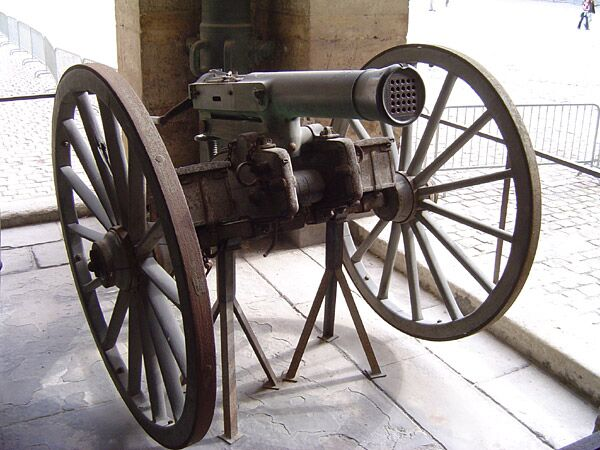
Front view of Reffye model mitrailleuse, 1866

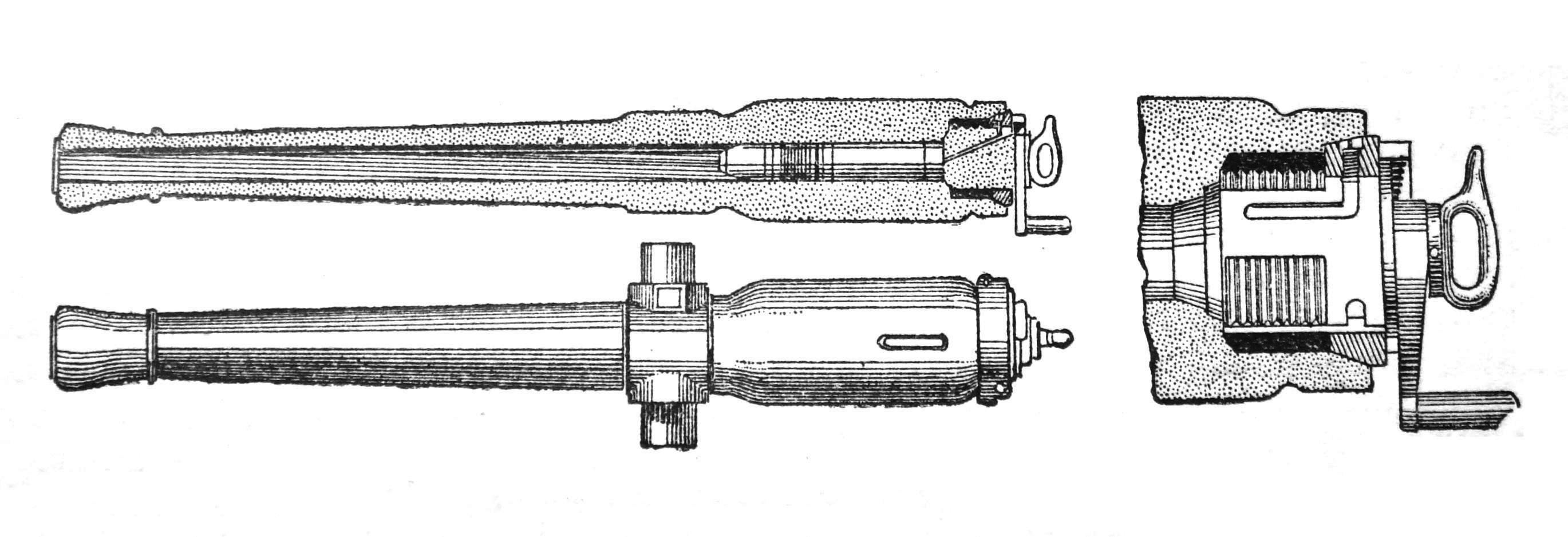
The 1870 Reffye cannon

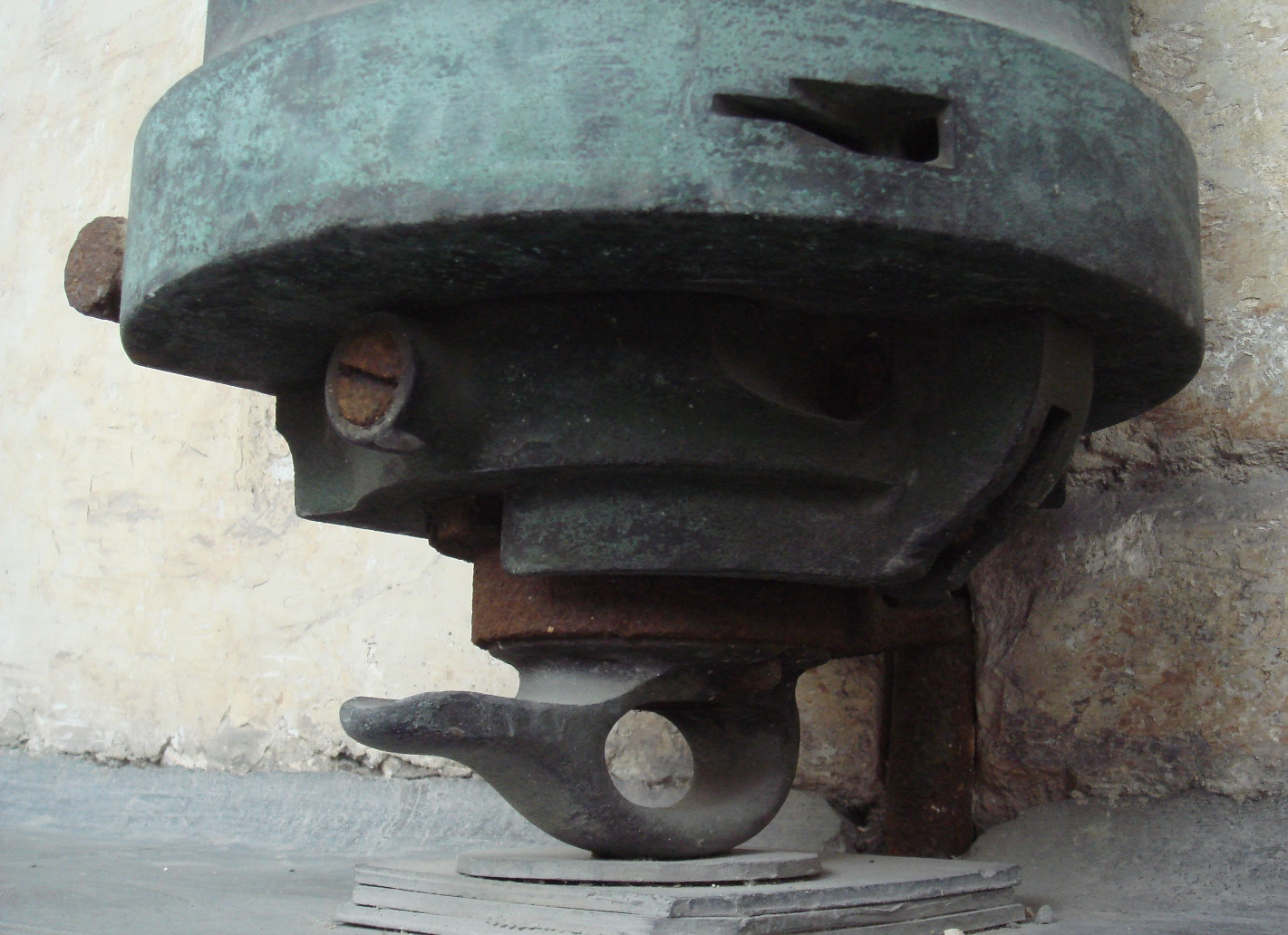
Reffye Mle 1870 85mm breech system

De Reffye developed in 1866 the Reffye mitrailleuse (named "Canon à balles"), one of the best early machine guns, which was used during the Franco-Prussian War of 1870. It was based on the earlier Belgian Montigny mitrailleuse of 1863.

== Breech-loading cannons ==
Jean-Baptiste Verchère de Reffye took a key role in introducing rifled breech loading cannons, a marked improvement over the previous La Hitte system which had been in place since 1858. The La Hitte system used rifled weapons, but they were muzzle-loading, which had the advantage of structural strength, but the disadvantage of slowness in loading.

In 1870, de Reffye developed the Reffye 85mm cannon, an 85 mm (3.35-inch) rifled breech-loading cannon, equipped with a breech screw, initially made of bronze. The cannon used shell cartridges for ammunition.

De Reffye also developed the Reffye 75mm cannon in 1873. His cannons would be soon superseded by the Lahitolle 95mm cannon and especially the De Bange 90mm cannon.
