= Reffye 85 mm cannon =

Canon de Reffye de 85 mm
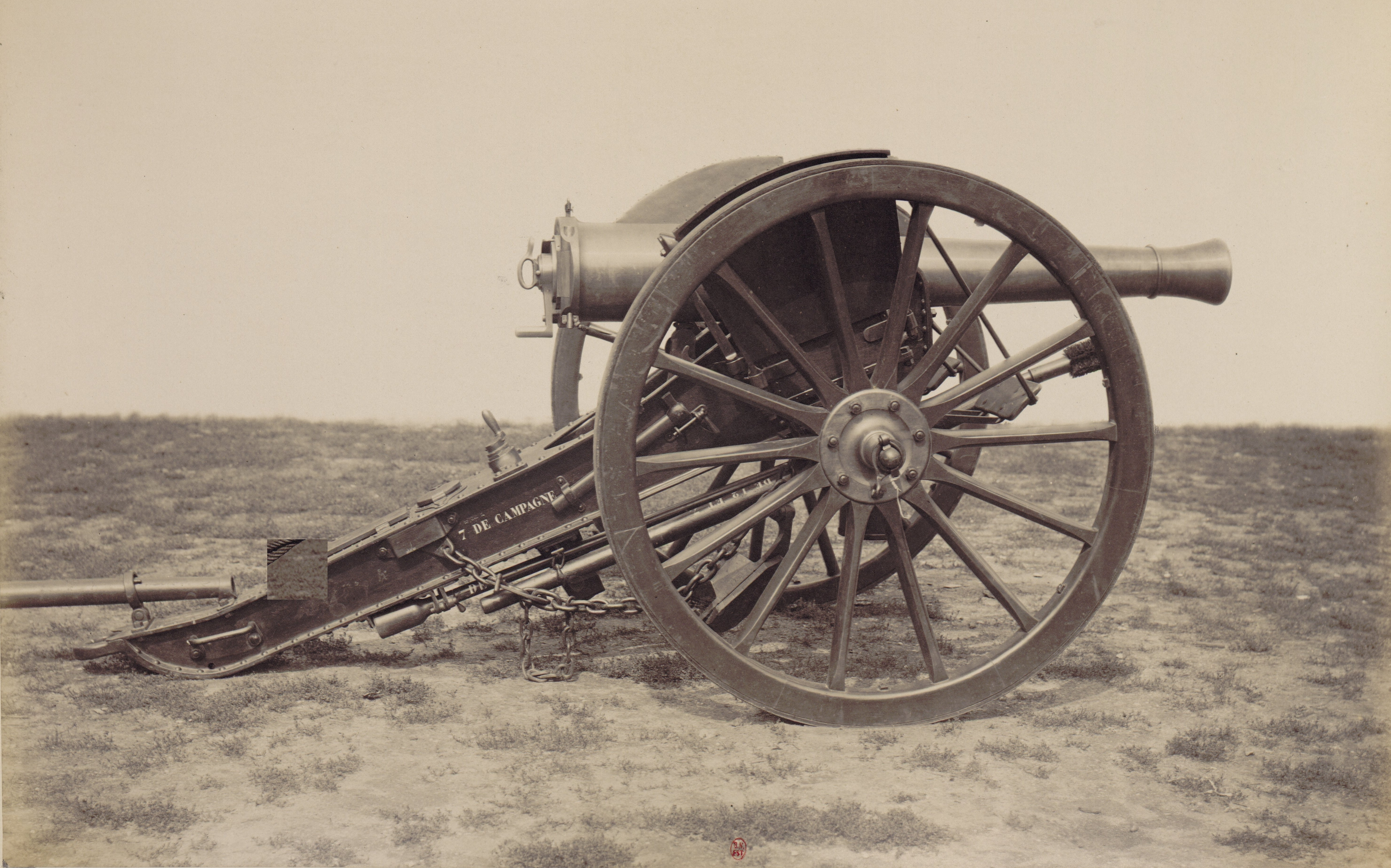
- Type: Field gun
- Place of origin: France

Service history
- In service: 1870–?
- Used by: France

Production history
- Designer: Jean-Baptiste Verchère de Reffye

Specifications
- Caliber: 85 mm

The Reffye 85 mm cannon (French: "Canon de campagne de 7 de Reffye modèle 1870") was a French artillery piece of the 19th century, developed by the French artillery General Jean-Baptiste Verchère de Reffye, superintendent of the works at Meudon. The weapon was adopted by the French Army from 1870. It was an 85 mm (3.35-inch) rifled breech-loading cannon, equipped with a breech screw, initially made of bronze.

The interrupted screw breech block used for sealing was an advanced feature, but the perfect sealing of the breech would only be achieved two years later with the invention of the de Bange obturator. The cannon used shell cartridges for ammunition. It would be soon superseded by the Lahitolle 95 mm cannon (1875) and especially the De Bange 90 mm cannon (1877).

Reffye also developed the Reffye 75 mm cannon in 1873.

Reffye also developed in 1866 a mitrailleuse (named "Canon à balles"), one of the best early machine guns, which was used during the Franco-Prussian War of 1870.

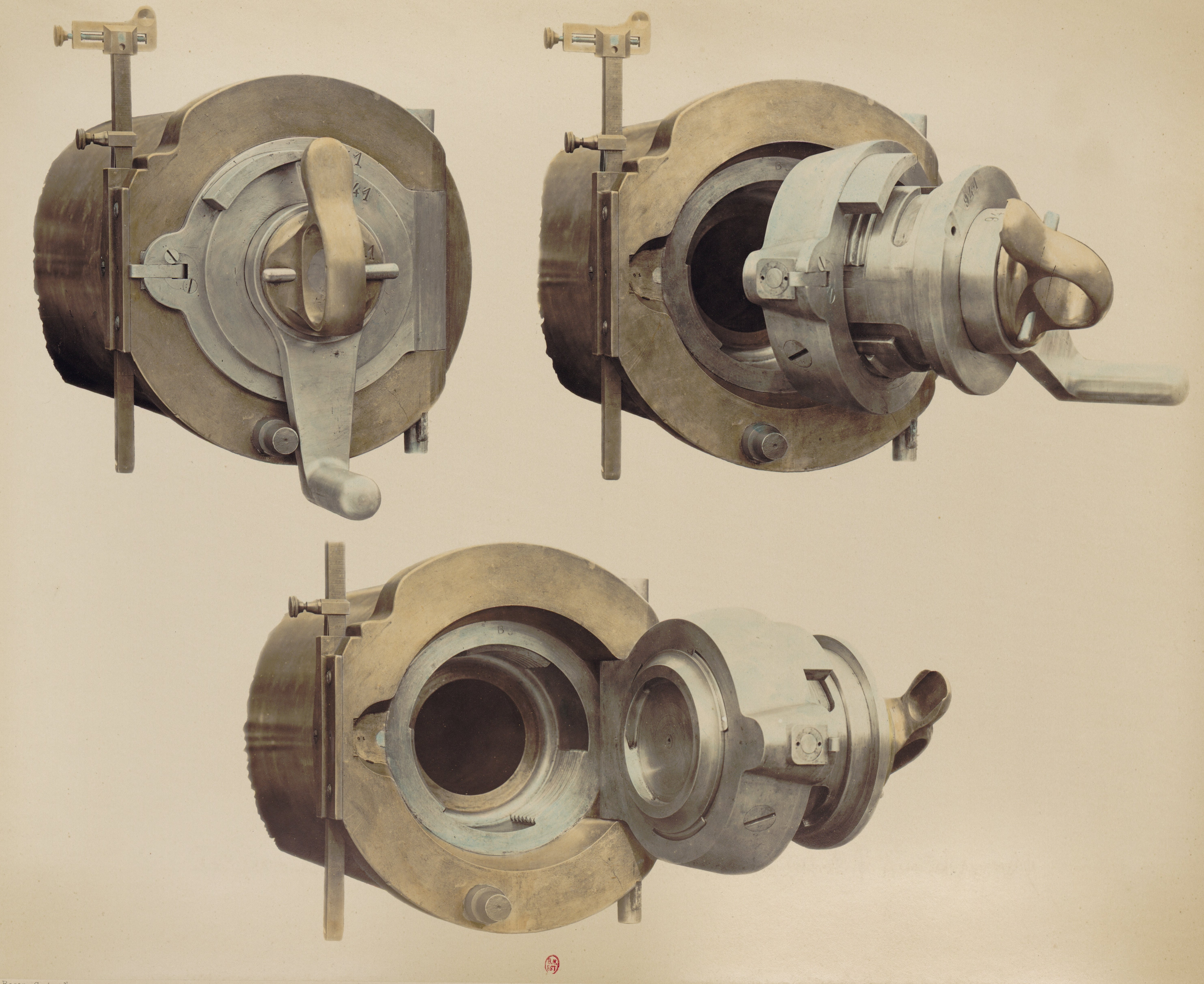
Reffye breech.

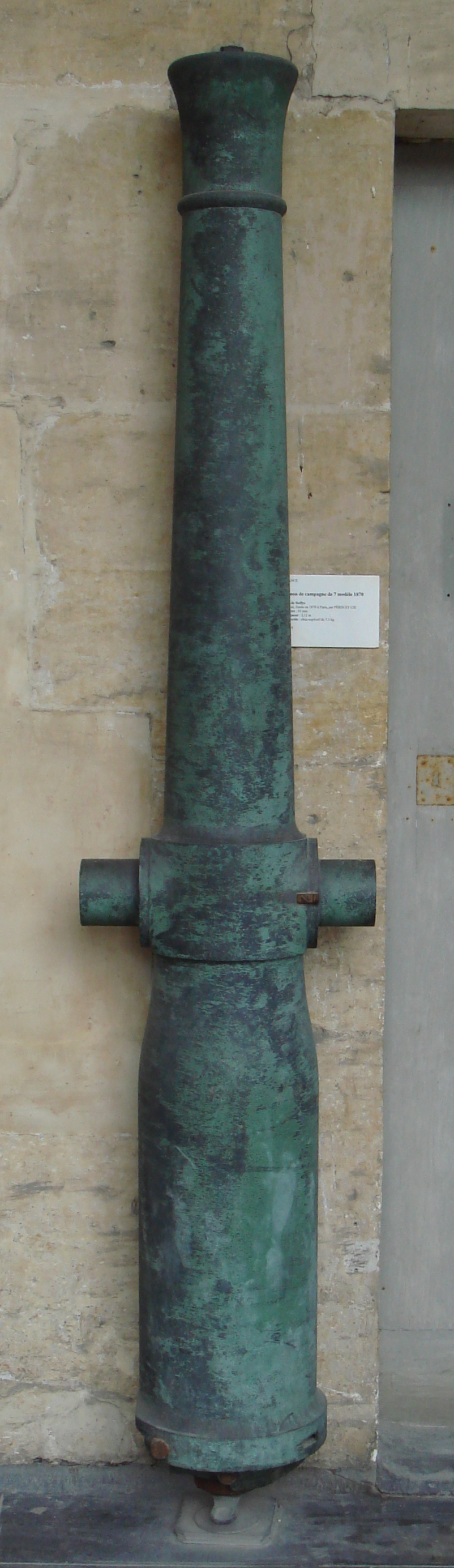
Reffye 85mm cannon ("Canon de campagne de 7 modèle 1870"), bronze, manufactured by Périn et Cie in Paris, Mle 1870. Length 2.10m. Projectile: 7.1kg explosive shell.

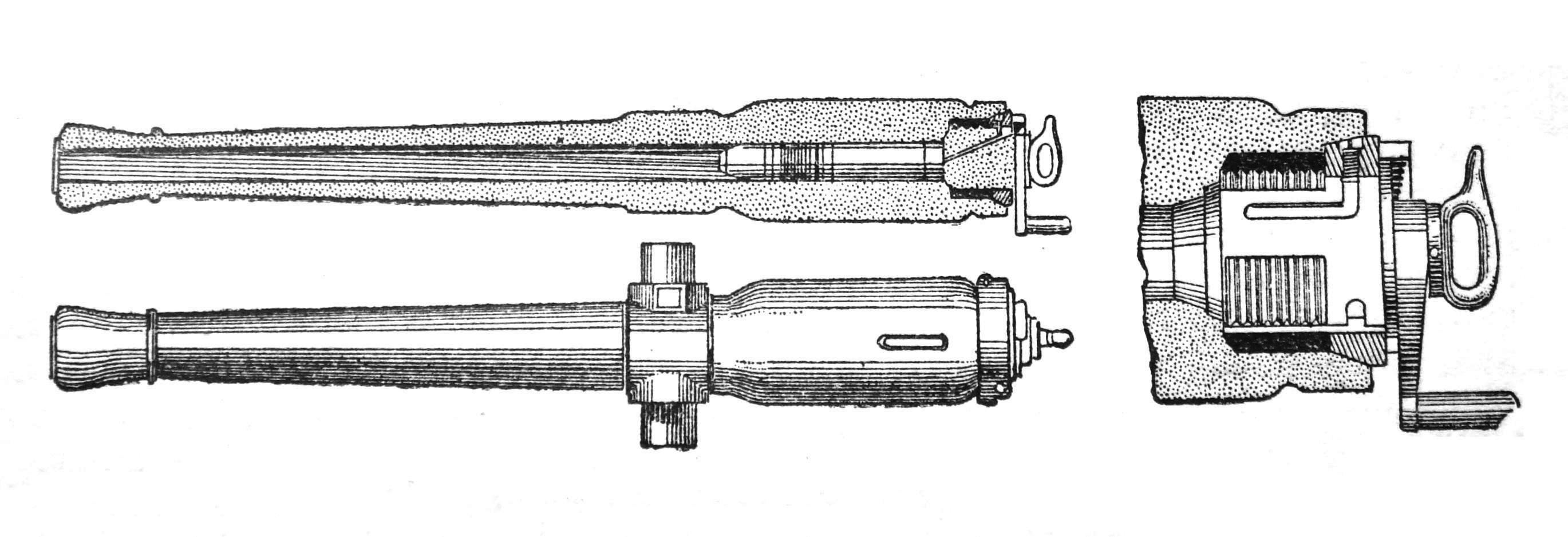
Diagram of the 1870 Reffye cannon.

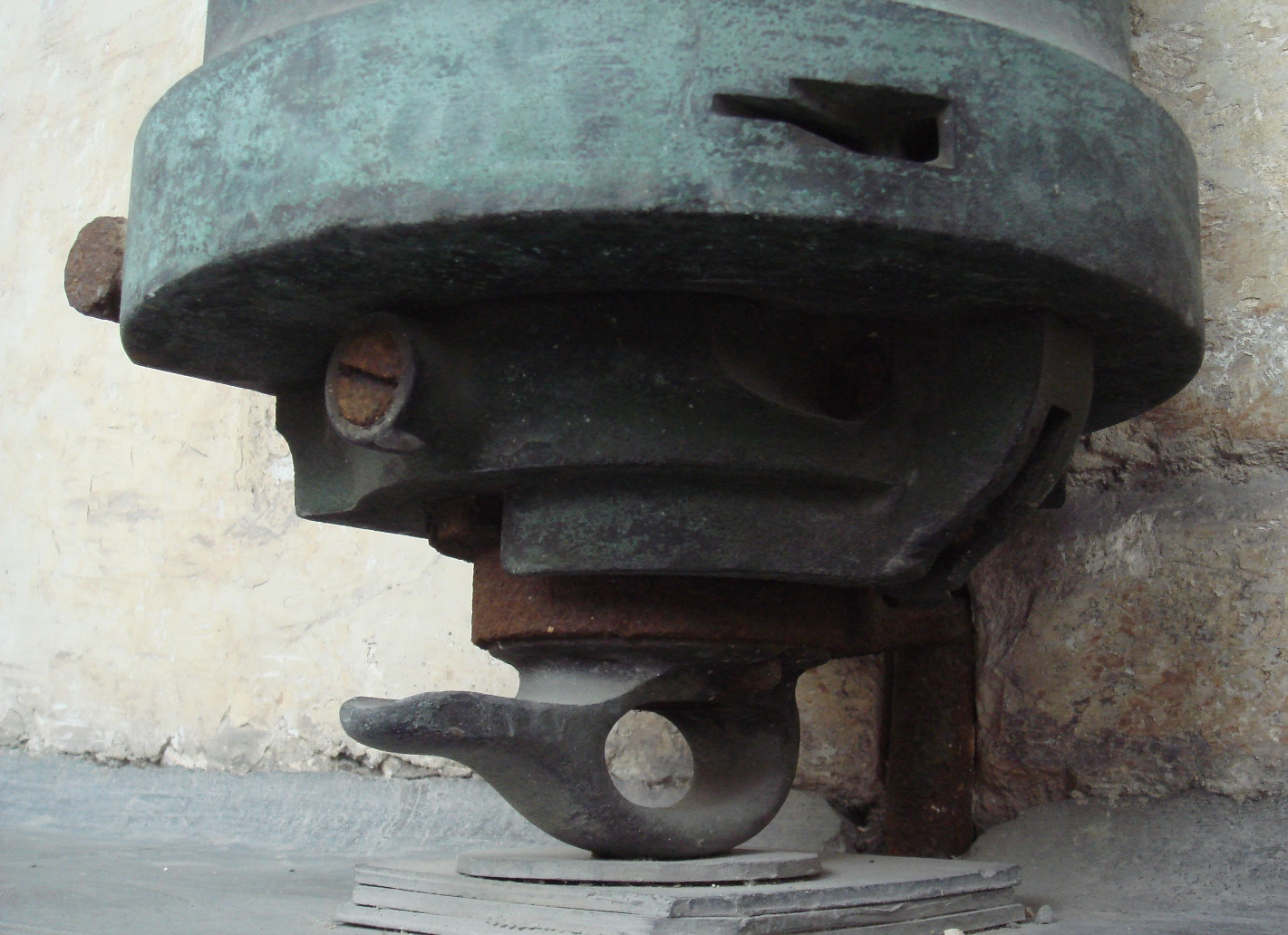
Reffye Mle 1870 85mm breech system.
