= Cours-la-Ville =

- Part of Cours
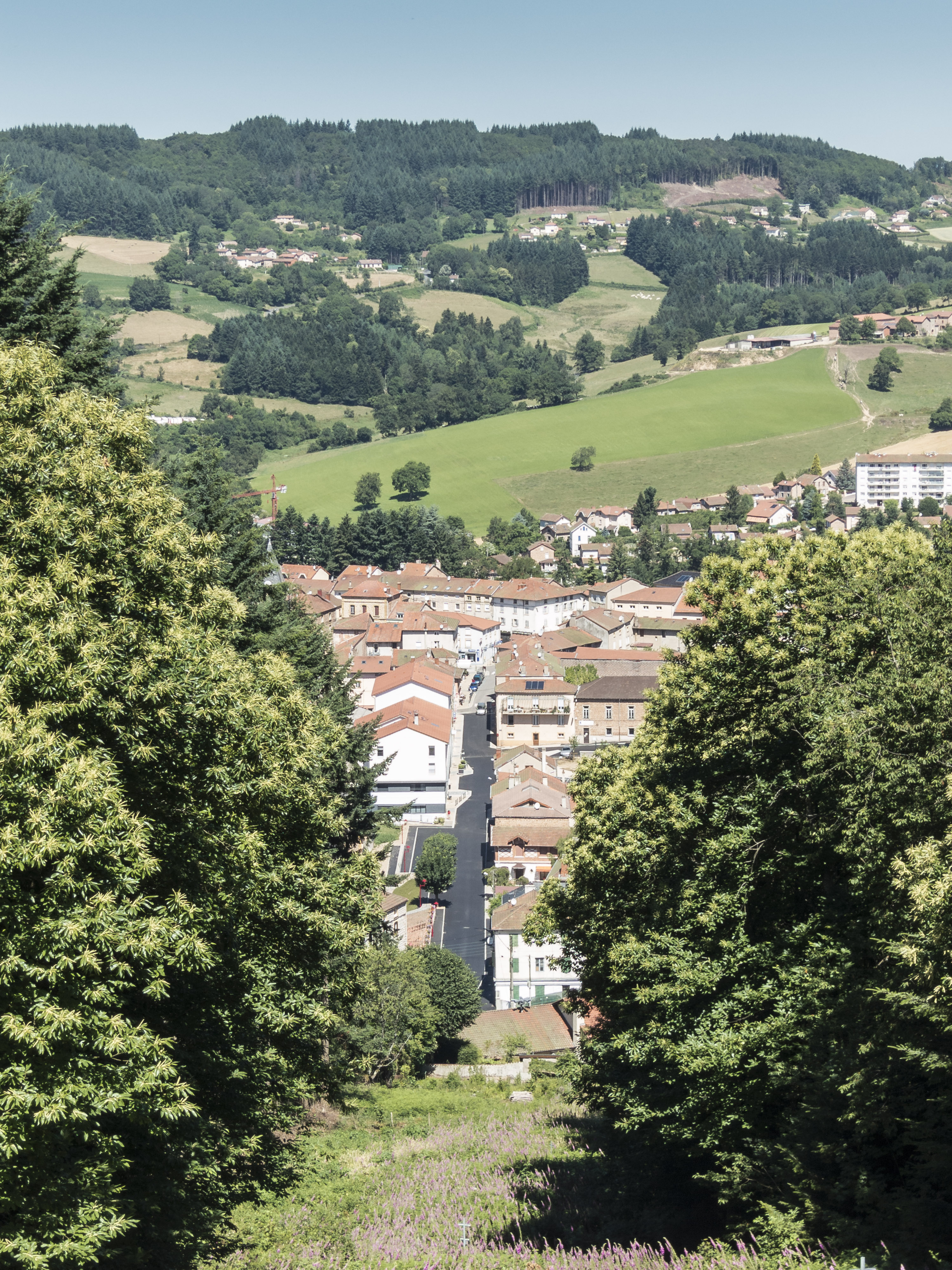
- A general view of Cours-la-Ville

- Coat of arms
- Location of Cours-la-Ville
- Location within France Location within Auvergne-Rhône-Alpes
- Coordinates: 46°06′01″N 4°19′17″E
- Country: France
- Region: Auvergne-Rhône-Alpes
- Department: Rhône
- Arrondissement: Villefranche-sur-Saône
- Canton: Thizy-les-Bourgs
- Commune: Cours
- Area^{1}: 19.48 km^{2} (7.52 sq mi)
- Elevation: 586 m (1,923 ft)
- Highest elevation: 860 m (2,820 ft)
- Lowest elevation: 437 m (1,434 ft)
- Population (2022): 3,565
  - Density: 183.0/km^{2} (474.0/sq mi)
- Time zone: UTC+01:00 (CET)
  - Summer (DST): UTC+02:00 (CEST)
- Postal code: 69470
- ^{1} French Land Register data, which excludes lakes, ponds, glaciers > 1 km^{2} (0.386 sq mi or 247 acres) and river estuaries.

Cours-la-Ville (French pronunciation: [kuʁ la vil]) is a former commune in the Rhône department in eastern France. It is the seat of the commune of Cours.

== History ==
It was formed in 1974 by the merger of Cours and La Ville. On 1 January 2016, Cours-la-Ville, Pont-Trambouze and Thel merged becoming one commune called Cours.

== International relations ==
Cours-la-Ville is twinned with:

- Winslow, United Kingdom

== See also ==
- Communes of the Rhône department
