= Jonathan Géry =

French politician (born 1986)

- Géry in 2025

Member of the National Assembly for Rhône's 8th constituency
- Incumbent
- Assumed office 8 July 2024
- Preceded by: Nathalie Serre

Personal details
- Born: 12 October 1986 (age 40) Aubenas, France
- Party: National Rally

Jonathan Géry (French pronunciation: [ʒɔnatɑ̃ ʒeʁi]; born 12 October 1986) is a French police officer and politician of the National Rally (RN) who was elected to the National Assembly for the 8th constituency of Rhône in 2024. He is the RN leader in the canton of Val d'Oingt and previously served in the Gendarmerie.

In Parliament Géry has served on the Committee on Laws (2024–2026) and Committee on National Defence and the Armed Forces (2026–present).
