= Patrice Verchère =

French politician

Member of the National Assembly for Rhône's 8th constituency
- In office 20 June 2007 – 18 June 2020
- Preceded by: Robert Lamy
- Succeeded by: Nathalie Serre

Personal details
- Born: 29 December 1973 (age 52) Pont-Trambouze, Rhône, France
- Party: Republican

Patrice Verchère (born December 29, 1973, in Pont-Trambouze) is a French politician who has been member of the National Assembly of France for Rhône's 8th constituency from 2007 to 2020, as a member of the Republicans.

He was elected Mayor of Cours in 2020 and resigned as Member of Parliament due to the dual mandate. He was replaced in parliament by his substitute Nathalie Serre.
