= Cours, Rhône =

Cours
- Commune
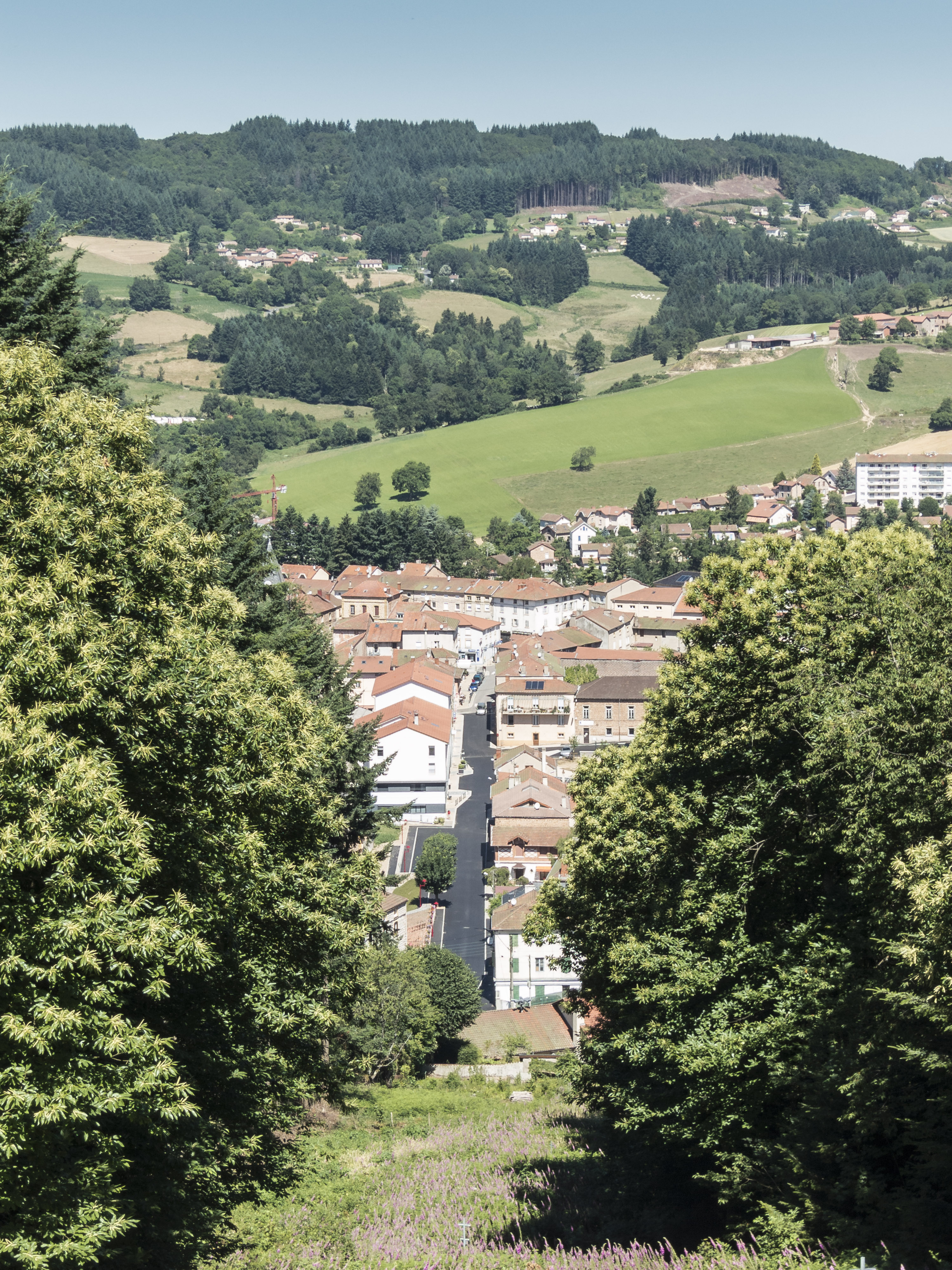
- A general view of Cours-la-Ville

- Coat of arms
- Location of Cours
- Location within France Location within Auvergne-Rhône-Alpes
- Coordinates: 46°06′01″N 4°19′17″E
- Country: France
- Region: Auvergne-Rhône-Alpes
- Department: Rhône
- Arrondissement: Villefranche-sur-Saône
- Canton: Thizy-les-Bourgs
- Intercommunality: CA de l'Ouest Rhodanien

Government
  - Mayor (2020–2026): Patrice Verchère
- Area^{1}: 33.81 km^{2} (13.05 sq mi)
- Elevation: 656 m (2,152 ft)
- Highest elevation: 905 m (2,969 ft)
- Lowest elevation: 407 m (1,335 ft)
- Population (2023): 4,306
  - Density: 127.4/km^{2} (329.9/sq mi)
- Time zone: UTC+01:00 (CET)
  - Summer (DST): UTC+02:00 (CEST)
- INSEE/Postal code: 69066 /69470
- ^{1} French Land Register data, which excludes lakes, ponds, glaciers > 1 km^{2} (0.386 sq mi or 247 acres) and river estuaries.

Cours (French pronunciation: [kuʁ]) is a commune in the Rhône department and Auvergne-Rhône-Alpes region in eastern France. Cours-la-Ville is the municipal seat.

== History ==
On 1 January 2016, Cours was created by the merger of Cours-la-Ville, Pont-Trambouze and Thel.

== Population ==
Population data refer to the area corresponding with the commune as of January 2025.

Historical population
Year	Pop.	±% p.a.
1968	6,879	—
1975	6,528	−0.75%
1982	6,054	−1.07%
1990	5,487	−1.22%
1999	5,082	−0.85%
2007	4,726	−0.90%
2012	4,624	−0.44%
2017	4,449	−0.77%
2023	4,306	−0.54%
Source: INSEE
