= Rhône's 8th constituency =

Constituency of the National Assembly of France

8th constituency of Rhône
- inline Constituency of the National Assembly of France

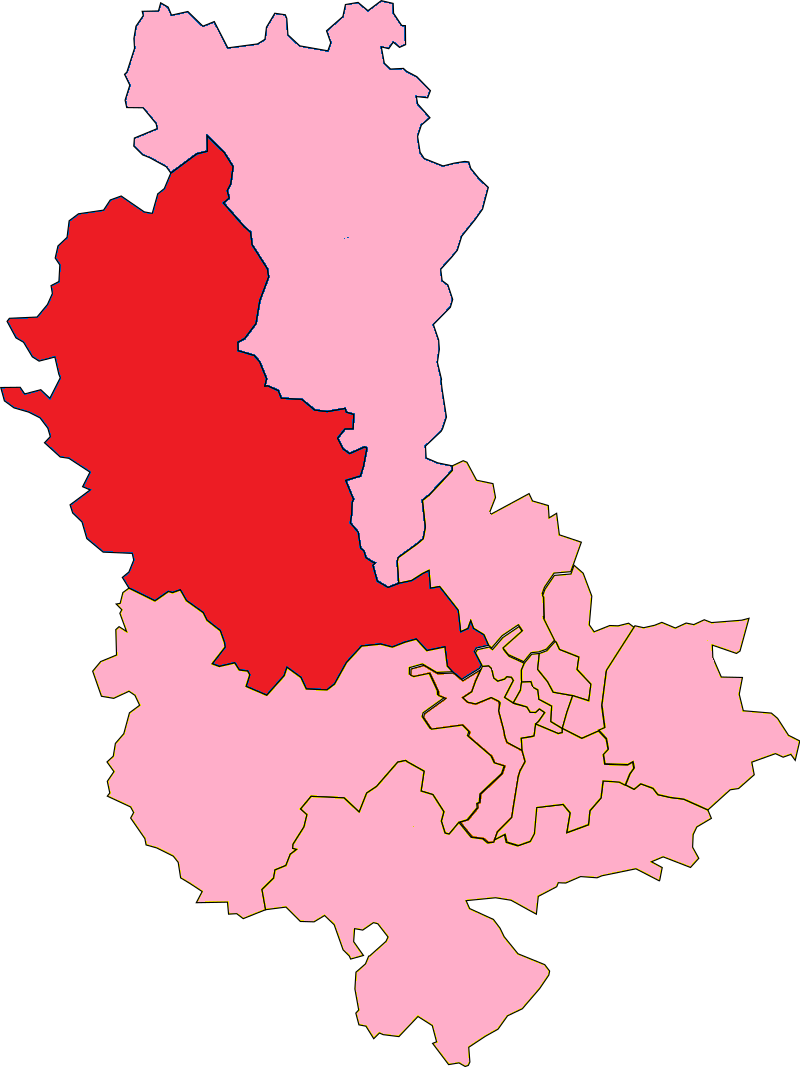
- Rhône's's 8th Constituency shown within Rhône
- Deputy: Jonathan Géry; RN
- Department: Rhône
- Cantons: Amplepuis, L'Arbresle, Le Bois-d'Oingt, Ecully, Lamure-sur-Azergues, Tarare, Thizy
- Registered voters: 102568

The 8th constituency of the Rhône (French: Huitième circonscription du Rhône) is a French legislative constituency in the Rhône département. Like the other 576 French constituencies, it elects one MP using a two round electoral system.

== Description ==
The 8th constituency of the Rhône lies in the north of the department and is largely rural in character.

The voters of the 8th have consistently returned conservative deputies to the National Assembly, this seat being one of only two in the department to resist the En Marche! landslide in 2017.

== Assembly Members ==
Election	Member	Party
1988	Alain Mayoud	UDF
1993	Michel Mercier	UDF
1997	Robert Lamy	RPR
2002	Robert Lamy	UMP
2007	Patrice Verchère	UMP
2012	Patrice Verchère	UMP
2017	Patrice Verchère	LR
2020	Nathalie Serre	LR
2022	Nathalie Serre	LR
2024	Jonathan Géry	RN

== Election results ==
=== 2024 ===
Legislative Election 2024: Rhône's 8th constituency
Party	Candidate	Votes	%	±%
RN	Jonathan Géry	25810	33.46	+17.46
PS (NFP)	Anne Reymbaut	17548	22.75	n/a
LO	Tristan Teyssier	630	0.82	n/a
REC	Xavier Fourboul	876	1.14	−4.42
LR	Nathalie Serre	15941	20.66	−1.31
MoDem (Ensemble)	Dominique Despras	16338	21.18	−7.67
Turnout		77,143	98.13	+45.56
Registered electors		106,006		
2nd round result
RN	Jonathan Géry	29,317	37.90	+4.44
LR	Nathalie Serre	24,556	31.74	+11.08
PS	Anne Reymbaut	23439	30.30	+7.55
MoDem	Dominique Despras	51	0.07	−21.11
Turnout		77,363	97.78	+52.34
Registered electors		105,986		
RN gain from LR				

=== 2022 ===
Legislative Election 2022: Rhone's 8th constituency
Party	Candidate	Votes	%	±%
MoDem (Ensemble)	Dominique Despras	15,714	28.85	-8.18
LR (UDC)	Nathalie Serre	11,965	21.97	-10.13
PCF (NUPÉS)	Cécile Bulin	10,483	19.25	+4.47
RN	Antoine Dubois	8,713	16.00	+6.60
REC	Marie De Penfentenyo De Kervéréguin	3,031	5.56	N/A
FGR	Pascale Braud	1,141	2.09	N/A
Others	N/A	3,420	-	−
Turnout		54,467	52.57	+2.48
2nd round result
LR (UDC)	Nathalie Serre	21,855	50.81	-2.81
MoDem (Ensemble)	Dominique Despras	21,158	49.19	+2.81
Turnout		43,013	45.44	+2.31
LR hold				

=== 2017 ===
Legislative Election 2017: Rhône's 8th constituency
Party	Candidate	Votes	%	±%
LREM	Joëlle Terroir	19,021	37.03	
LR	Patrice Verchère	16,492	32.10	
LFI	Fabien De Marchi	4,976	9.69	
FN	Pierre Terrail	4,829	9.40	
EELV	Bénédicte Hominal	2,093	4.07	
Others	N/A	3,958		
Turnout		51,369	50.09	
2nd round result
LR	Patrice Verchère	23,721	53.62	
LREM	Joëlle Terroir	20,514	46.38	
Turnout		44,235	43.13	
LR hold				

=== 2012 ===
Legislative Election 2012: Rhône's 8th constituency
Party	Candidate	Votes	%	±%
UMP	Patrice Verchère	28,566	48.02	
PS	Sheila Mc Carron	16,446	27.65	
FN	Paul-Alexandre Martin	8,159	13.72	
FG	Laurent Moreno	2,364	3.97	
MoDem	Charlotte Hoffmann	1,684	2.83	
Others	N/A	2,265		
Turnout		59,484	60.43	
2nd round result
UMP	Patrice Verchère	34,221	63.48	
PS	Sheila Mc Carron	19,684	36.52	
Turnout		53,905	54.77	
UMP hold				

=== 2007 ===
Legislative Election 2007: Rhône's 8th constituency
Party	Candidate	Votes	%	±%
UMP	Patrice Verchère	26,879	53.43	
PS	Sheila McCarron	8,982	17.85	
MoDem	Jean-Pierre Guillot	4,855	9.65	
FN	Geoffrey Daquin	2,495	4.96	
LV	Véronique Toutant	1,779	3.54	
Far left	Paul Brichler	1,125	2.24	
PCF	Andrée Giroudon-Zelez	1,065	2.12	
Others	N/A	3,131		
Turnout		51,288	62.38	
UMP hold				

=== 2002 ===
Legislative Election 2002: Rhône's 8th constituency
Party	Candidate	Votes	%	±%
UMP	Robert Lamy	27,743	55.79	
PS	Yvon Olivier	10,177	20.46	
FN	Marie Veyret	6,358	12.78	
LV	Johanne Ruyssen	1,232	2.48	
Others	N/A	4,221		
Turnout		50,608	66.17	
UMP hold				

=== 1997 ===
Legislative Election 1997: Rhône's 8th constituency
Party	Candidate	Votes	%	±%
RPR	Robert Lamy	15,452	33.04	
PS	Maurice Depaix	14,127	30.21	
FN	Maurice Lièvre	8,107	17.34	
DVD	Antoine Duperray	2,245	4.80	
PCF	Bernard Bondon	1,889	4.04	
LV	Marc Jedliczka	1,323	2.83	
LO	Janine Laloy	1,180	2.52	
Others	N/A	2,439		
Turnout		49,104	69.06	
2nd round result
RPR	Robert Lamy	26,321	53.99	
PS	Maurice Depaix	22,433	46.01	
Turnout		51,568	72.53	
RPR gain from UDF				
