= Nathalie Serre =

French politician

Member of the National Assembly for Rhône's 8th constituency
- In office 18 June 2020 – 9 June 2024
- Preceded by: Patrice Verchère
- Succeeded by: Jonathan Géry

Personal details
- Born: 17 August 1968 (age 57) Besançon, Doubs, France
- Party: Republican

Nathalie Serre (born 17 August 1968 in Besançon) is a French politician who has been Member of Parliament for Rhône's 8th constituency from June 2020, when she replaced Patrice Verchère, to June 2024.

== Political career ==
In parliament, Serr sits with the Republicans group.

She was re-elected in the 2022 election.

In the run-up to the Republicans’ 2022 convention, Serre endorsed Éric Ciotti as the party's chairman.

In the 2024 election, she lost her seat in the second round to National Rally' Jonathan Géry.
