= Thel, Rhône =

Thel
- Part of Cours
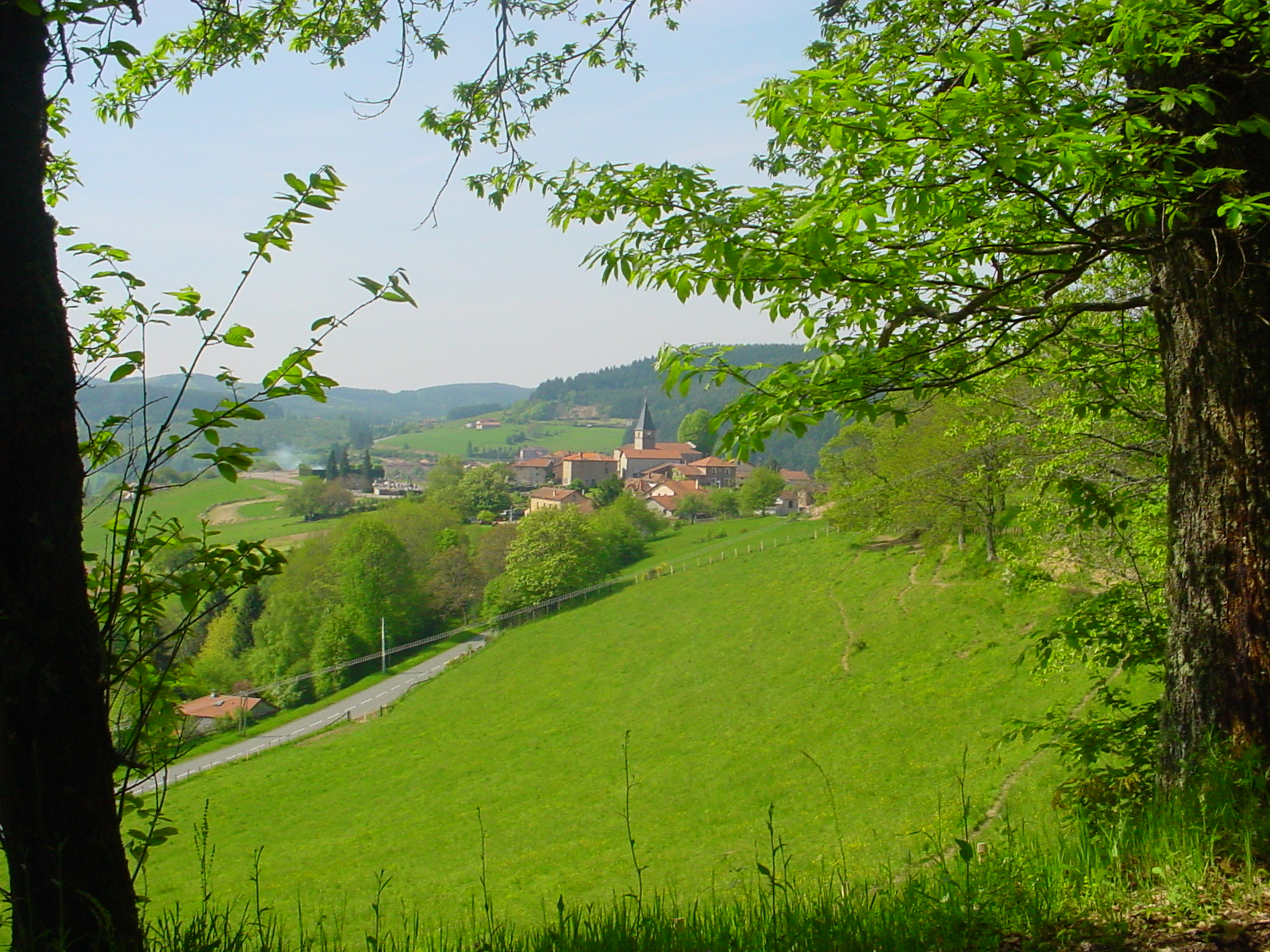
- The landscape of Thel

- Coat of arms
- Location of Thel
- Location within France Location within Auvergne-Rhône-Alpes
- Coordinates: 46°06′59″N 4°22′40″E
- Country: France
- Region: Auvergne-Rhône-Alpes
- Department: Rhône
- Arrondissement: Villefranche-sur-Saône
- Canton: Thizy-les-Bourgs
- Commune: Cours
- Area^{1}: 10.27 km^{2} (3.97 sq mi)
- Elevation: 780 m (2,560 ft)
- Highest elevation: 905 m (2,969 ft)
- Lowest elevation: 547 m (1,795 ft)
- Population (2022): 325
  - Density: 31.6/km^{2} (82.0/sq mi)
- Time zone: UTC+01:00 (CET)
  - Summer (DST): UTC+02:00 (CEST)
- Postal code: 69470
- ^{1} French Land Register data, which excludes lakes, ponds, glaciers > 1 km^{2} (0.386 sq mi or 247 acres) and river estuaries.

Thel (French pronunciation: [tɛl]) is a former commune in the Rhône department in eastern France.

== History ==
On 1 January 2016, Cours-la-Ville, Pont-Trambouze and Thel merged becoming one commune called Cours.

== See also ==
- Communes of the Rhône department
