= Pont-Trambouze =

- Part of Cours
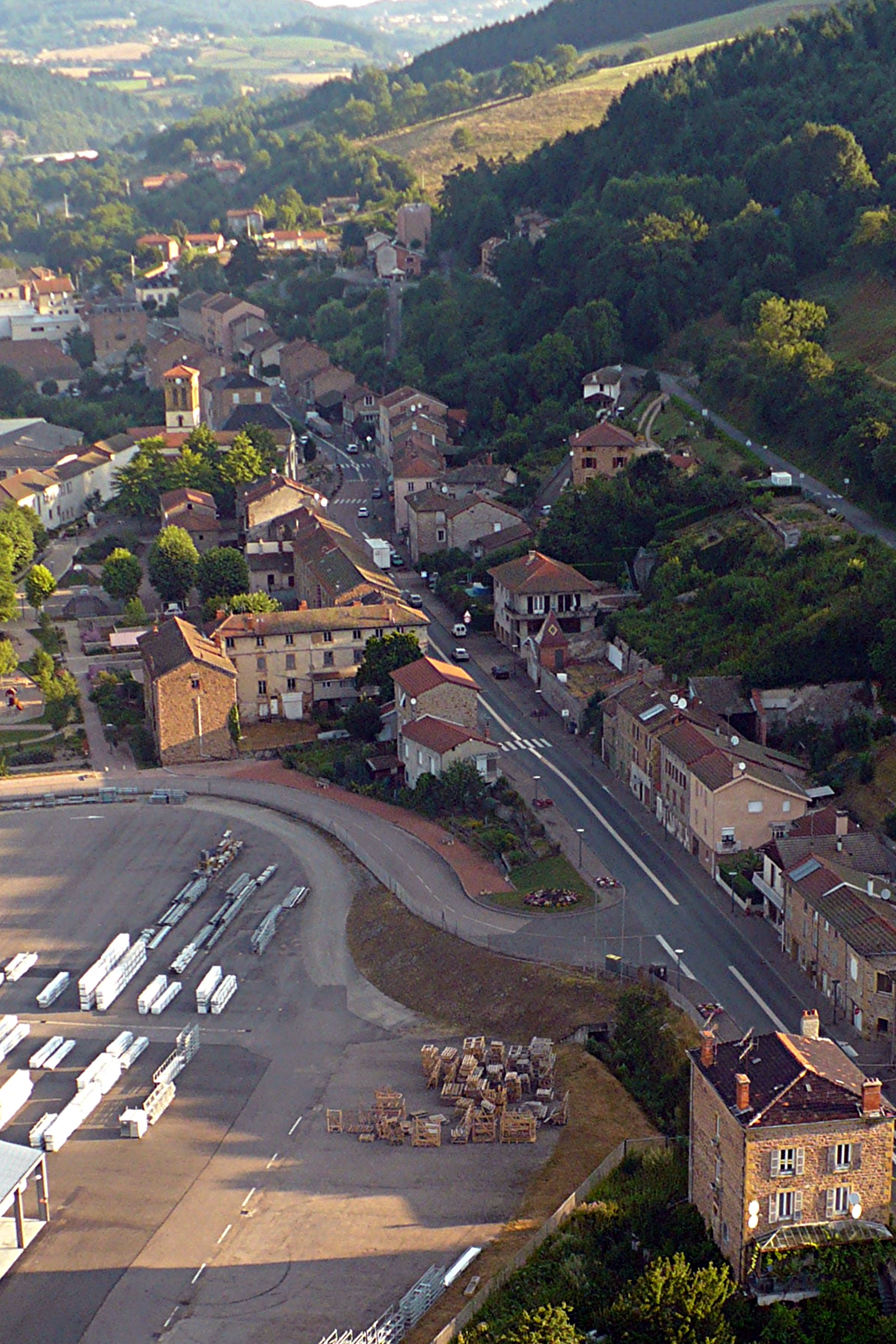
- Pont-Trambouze seen from above

- Coat of arms
- Location of Pont-Trambouze
- Location within France Location within Auvergne-Rhône-Alpes
- Coordinates: 46°04′24″N 4°18′56″E
- Country: France
- Region: Auvergne-Rhône-Alpes
- Department: Rhône
- Arrondissement: Villefranche-sur-Saône
- Canton: Thizy-les-Bourgs
- Commune: Cours
- Area^{1}: 4.06 km^{2} (1.57 sq mi)
- Elevation: 500 m (1,600 ft)
- Highest elevation: 645 m (2,116 ft)
- Lowest elevation: 407 m (1,335 ft)
- Population (2022): 439
  - Density: 108/km^{2} (280/sq mi)
- Time zone: UTC+01:00 (CET)
  - Summer (DST): UTC+02:00 (CEST)
- Postal code: 69240
- ^{1} French Land Register data, which excludes lakes, ponds, glaciers > 1 km^{2} (0.386 sq mi or 247 acres) and river estuaries.

Pont-Trambouze (French pronunciation: [pɔ̃ tʁɑ̃buz]) is a former commune in the Rhône department in eastern France.

== History ==
On 1 January 2016, Cours-la-Ville, Pont-Trambouze and Thel merged becoming one commune called Cours.

== See also ==
- Communes of the Rhône department
