= Lahitolle 95 mm cannon =

Canon Lahitolle de 95 mm
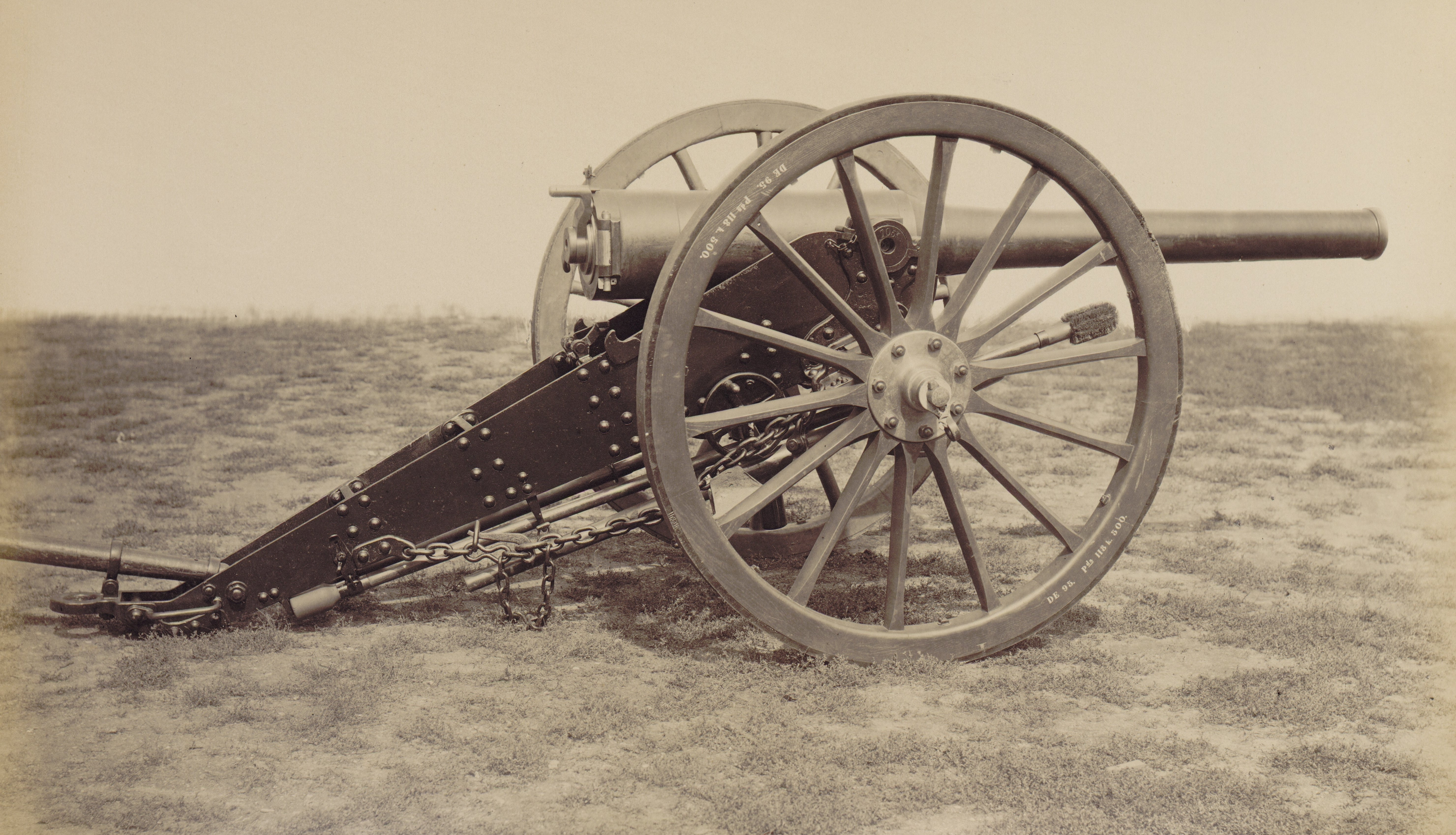
- Type: Field gun Coastal artillery Fortress artillery Railway artillery
- Place of origin: France

Service history
- In service: 1875–1945
- Used by: France; Nazi Germany; Kingdom of Italy
- Wars: World War I World War II

Production history
- Designer: Henri Périer de Lahitolle

Specifications
- Mass: 1,413 kg (3,115 lb)
- Barrel length: 2.28 m (7 ft 6 in) L/24
- Shell: Separate-loading, bagged charges and projectiles
- Shell weight: 12 kg (26 lb 7 oz)
- Caliber: 95 mm (3.7 in)
- Breech: Lahitolle interrupted screw
- Recoil: None
- Carriage: Box trail
- Elevation: -10° to +24°
- Traverse: None
- Rate of fire: 1 rpm
- Muzzle velocity: 400 m/s (1,300 ft/s)
- Effective firing range: 6.5 km (4 mi)
- Maximum firing range: 9.8 km (6 mi)

The Lahitolle 95 mm cannon (Mle 1875) was a French cannon of the 19th century, developed in 1875 by the artillery commander de Lahitolle. The Lahitolle 90 mm was the first French field cannon made of steel, and one of the first to be equipped with a screw breech (issued 16 years after the British and Prussians adopted a similar system). It was adopted by the French Army in 1875 and later superseded the Reffye and de Bange 90 mm cannons. An improved version, the Lahitolle 95 mm (Mle 1888), was developed in 1888.

== Coastal Artillery ==
A version called the Canon de 95 sur affut de Cote mle 1904 was mounted on a Vavasseur mount with a gun shield for use in coastal defenses. The gun sat on a cradle that held the trunnioned barrel on top of a pedestal. When the gun fired a combination of inclined rails, and hydraulic buffers returned the gun to position.

== Fortress Artillery ==
In addition to its coastal defense role, Lahitolle 95 mm cannons were employed on pedestal mounts in France's Séré de Rivières system of fortifications. Approximately 475 cannons were used in coastal and land fortifications.

== Railway Artillery ==
Early in World War One, 16 coastal defense cannons were mounted on armored rail cars for use with France's armored trains. They are believed to have been retired by 1916.

== World War I ==
The Lahitolle 95 mm was still in use during World War I, together with the de Bange 90 mm cannon, as French industry could not keep with production requirements for the much newer Canon de 75.

== World War II ==
The Lahitolle 95 mm was still in use in the fortifications of the Maginot Line during World War II. Mle 1904 guns captured by the Germans were given the designation 9.5cm Küstenkanone (f) and used in Germany's Atlantic Wall fortifications.

== Gallery ==
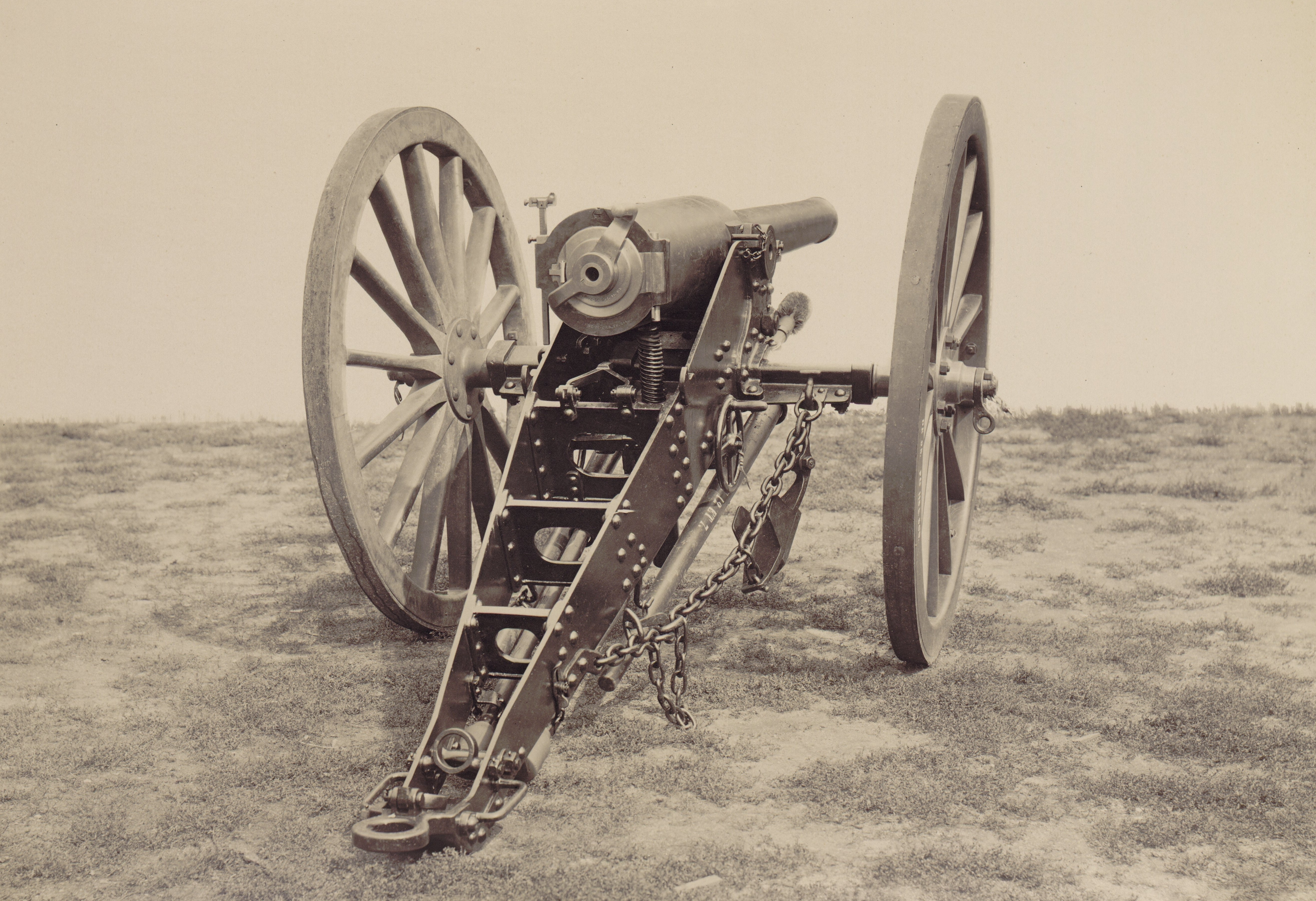
A rear view.

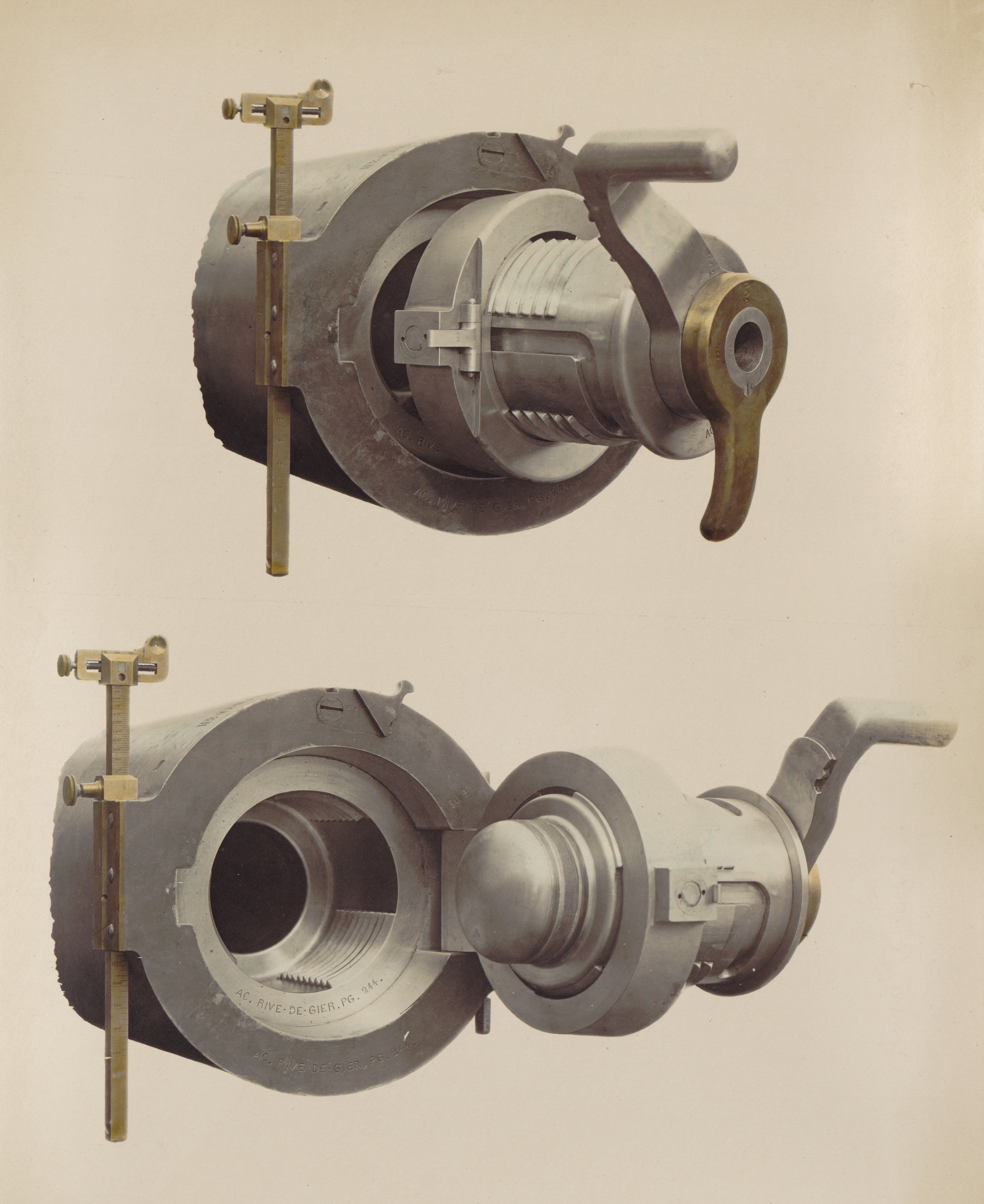
Lahitolle breech.

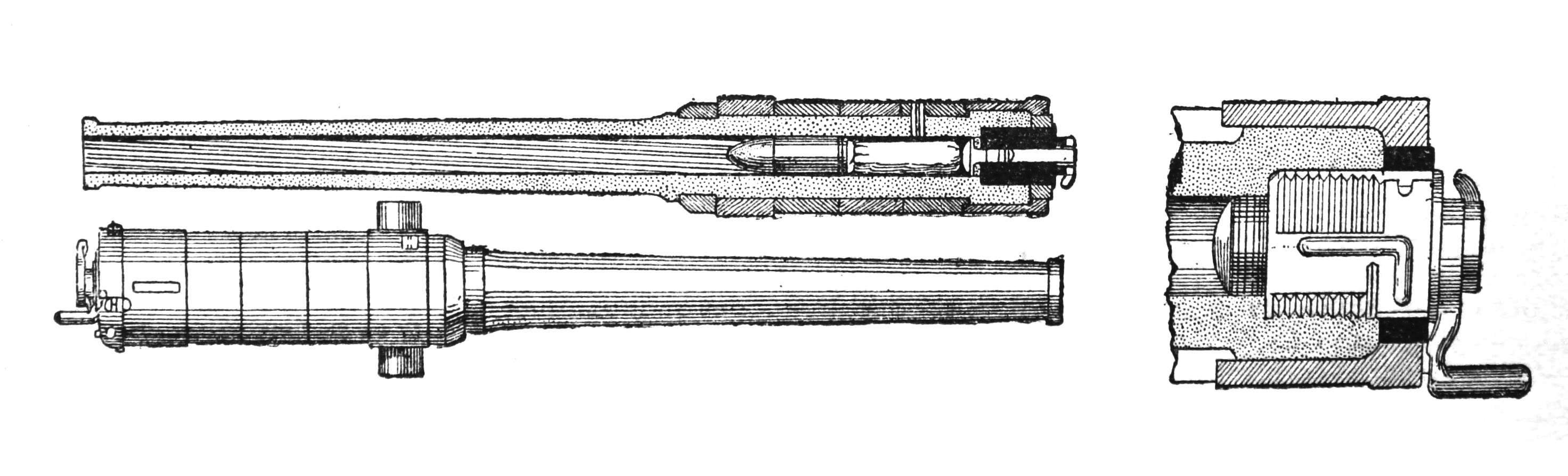
Diagrams of the Lahitolle 95 mm cannon.

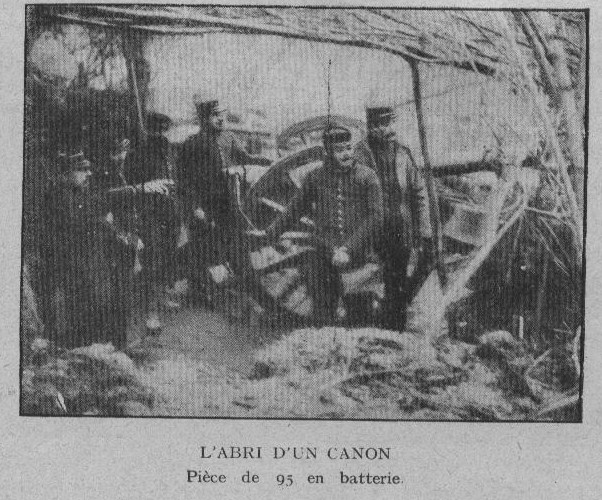
A Lahitolle 95 mm cannon during the First World War.

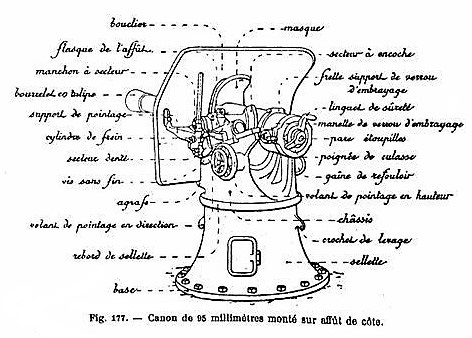
Canon de 95 sur affut de cote mle 1904. On a Vavasseur mounting.

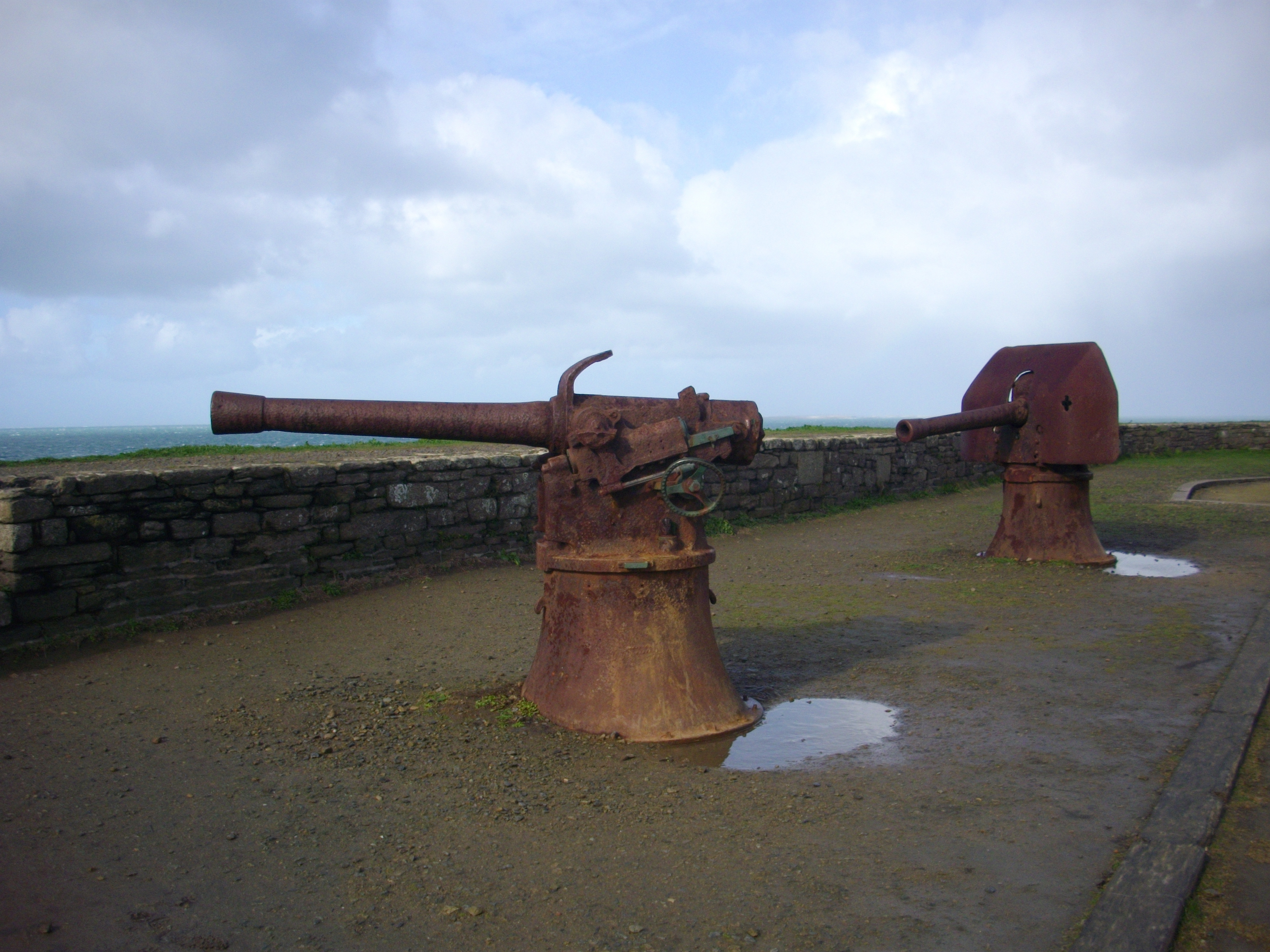
A mle 1904 at a sailors memorial at Plougonvelin (Finistère, France).

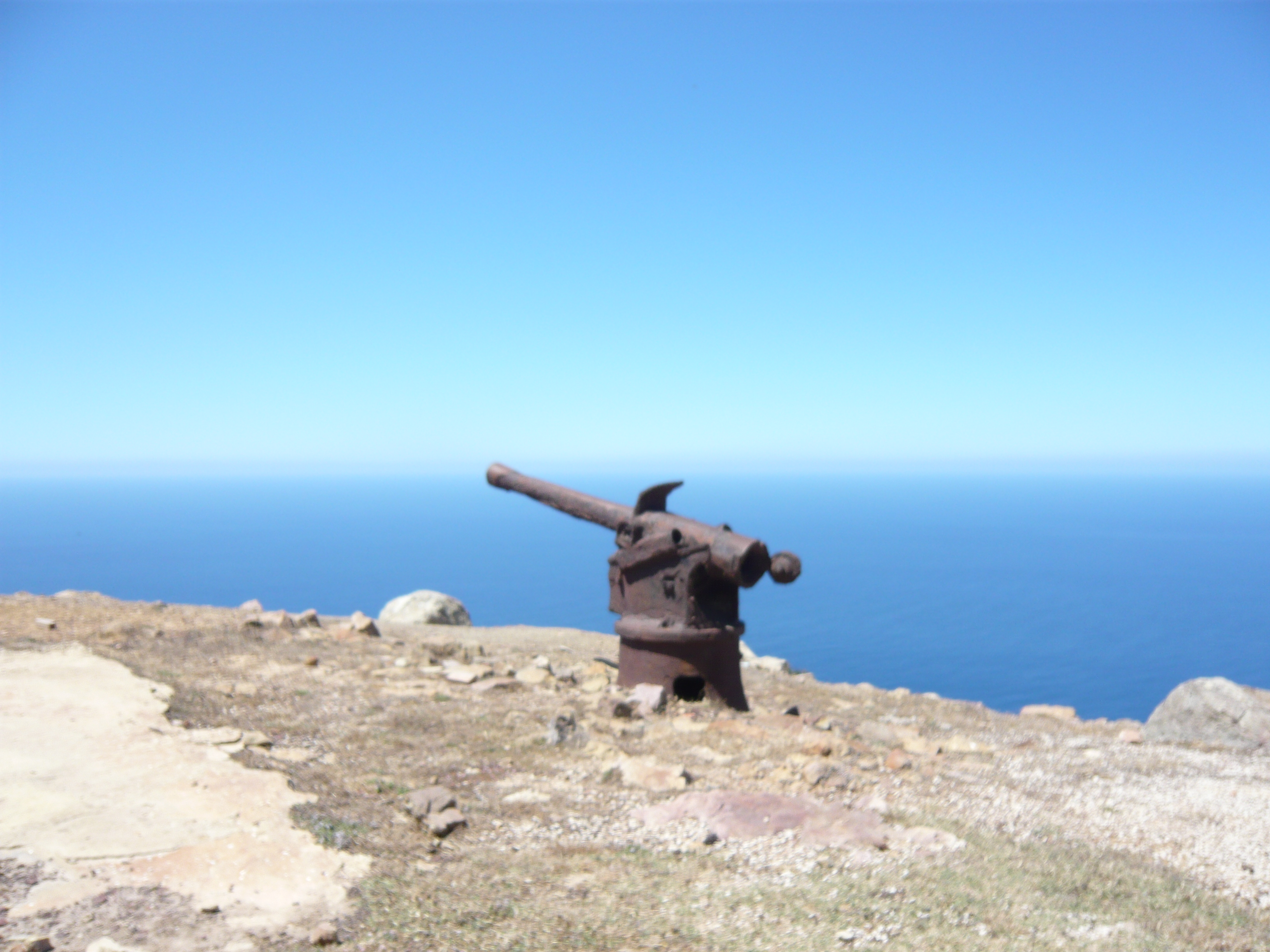
A mle 1904 at Jebel El Haouaria Tunisia.

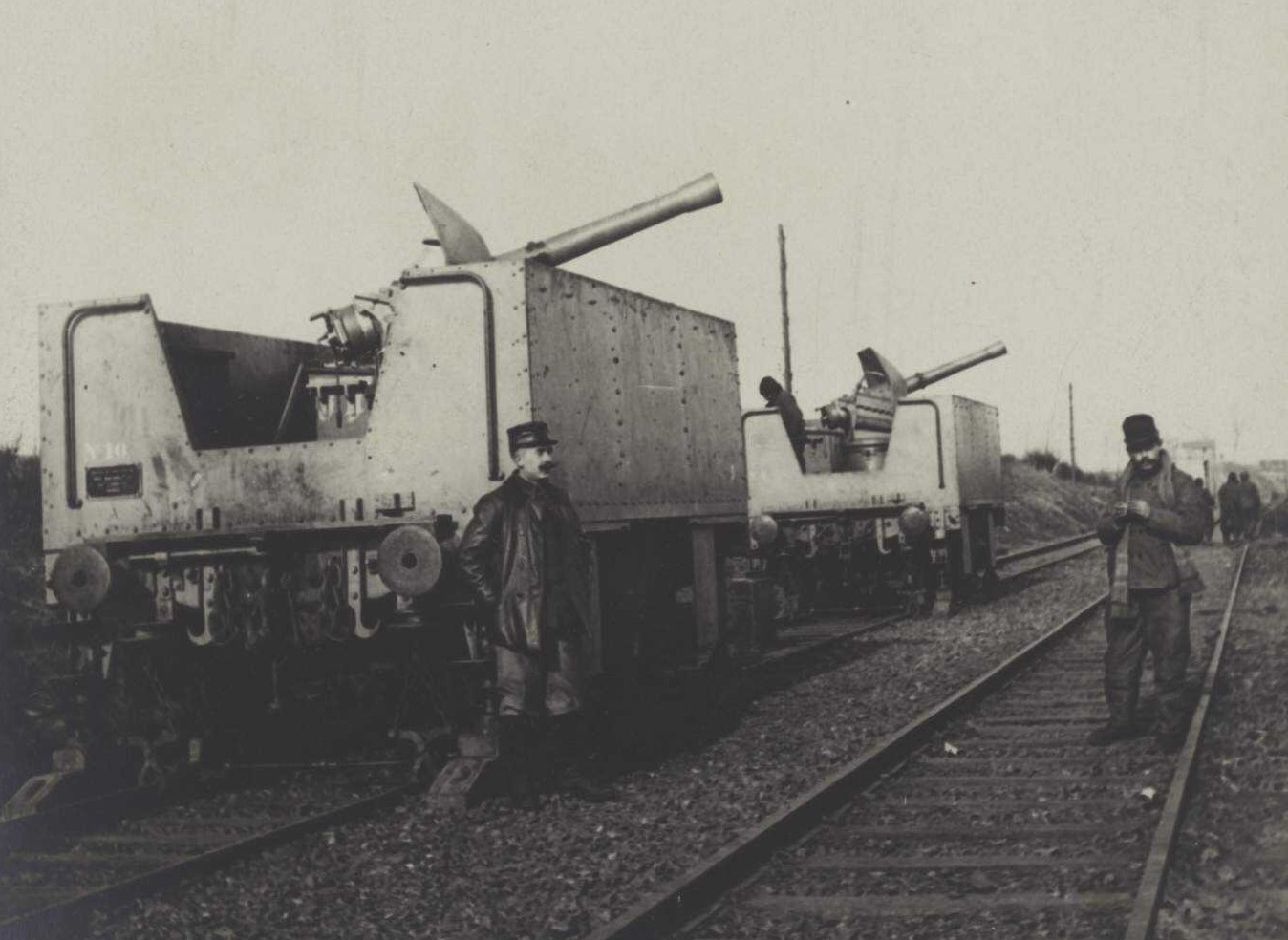
An armored train with mle 1904 guns.

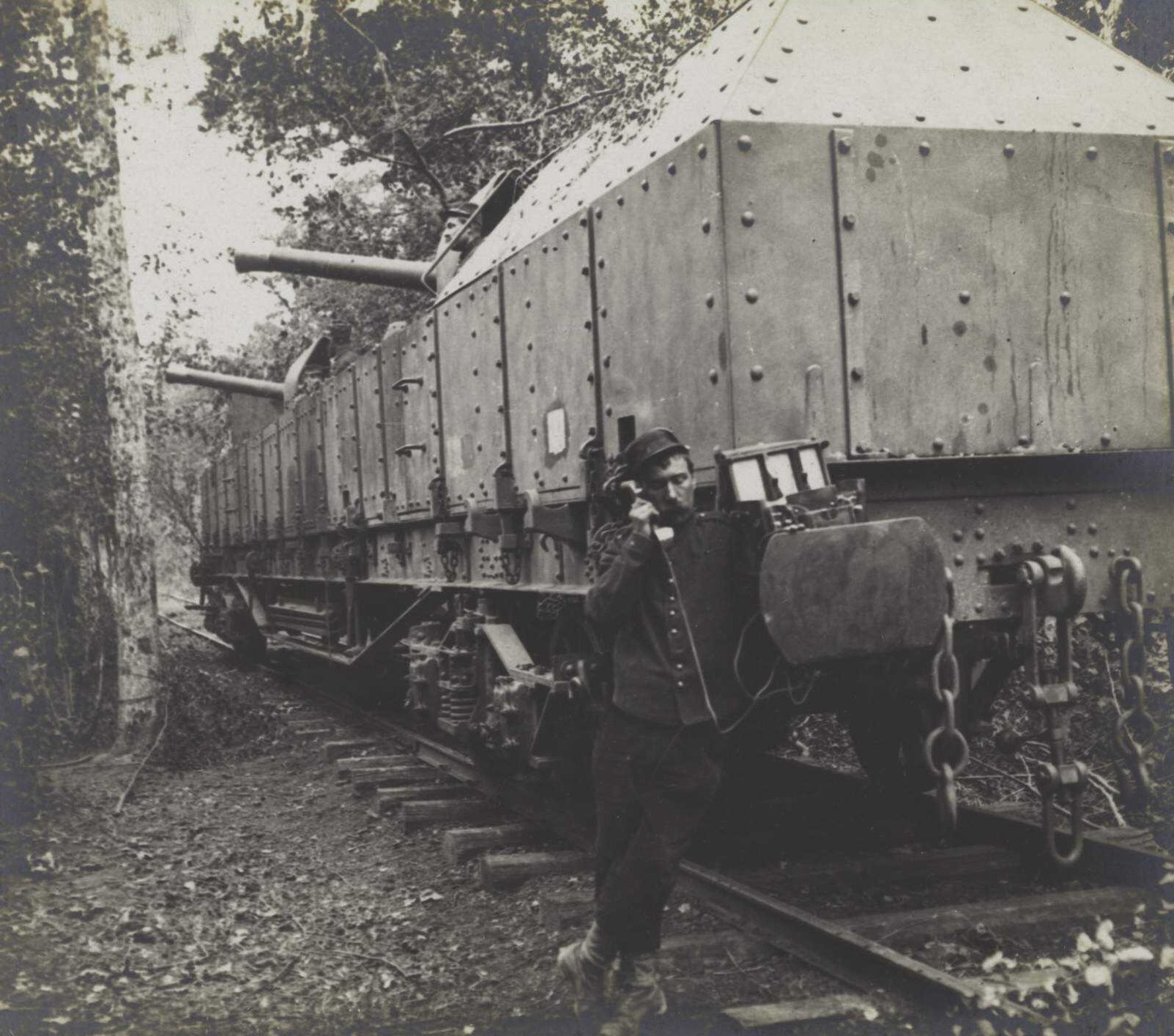
An armored train with mle 1904 guns.

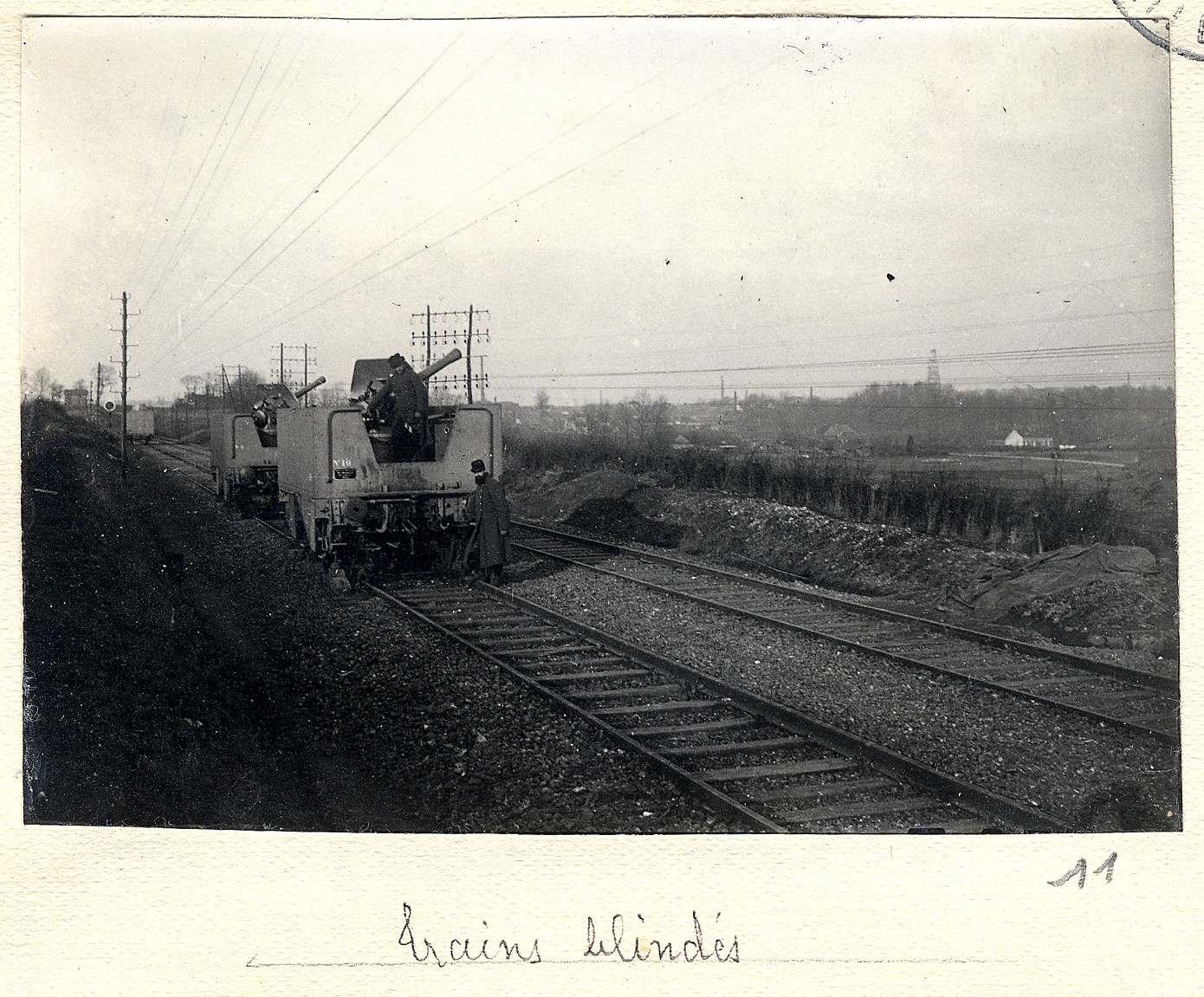
An armored train with mle 1904 guns.
