= De Bange 90 mm cannon =

Canon de Bange de 90
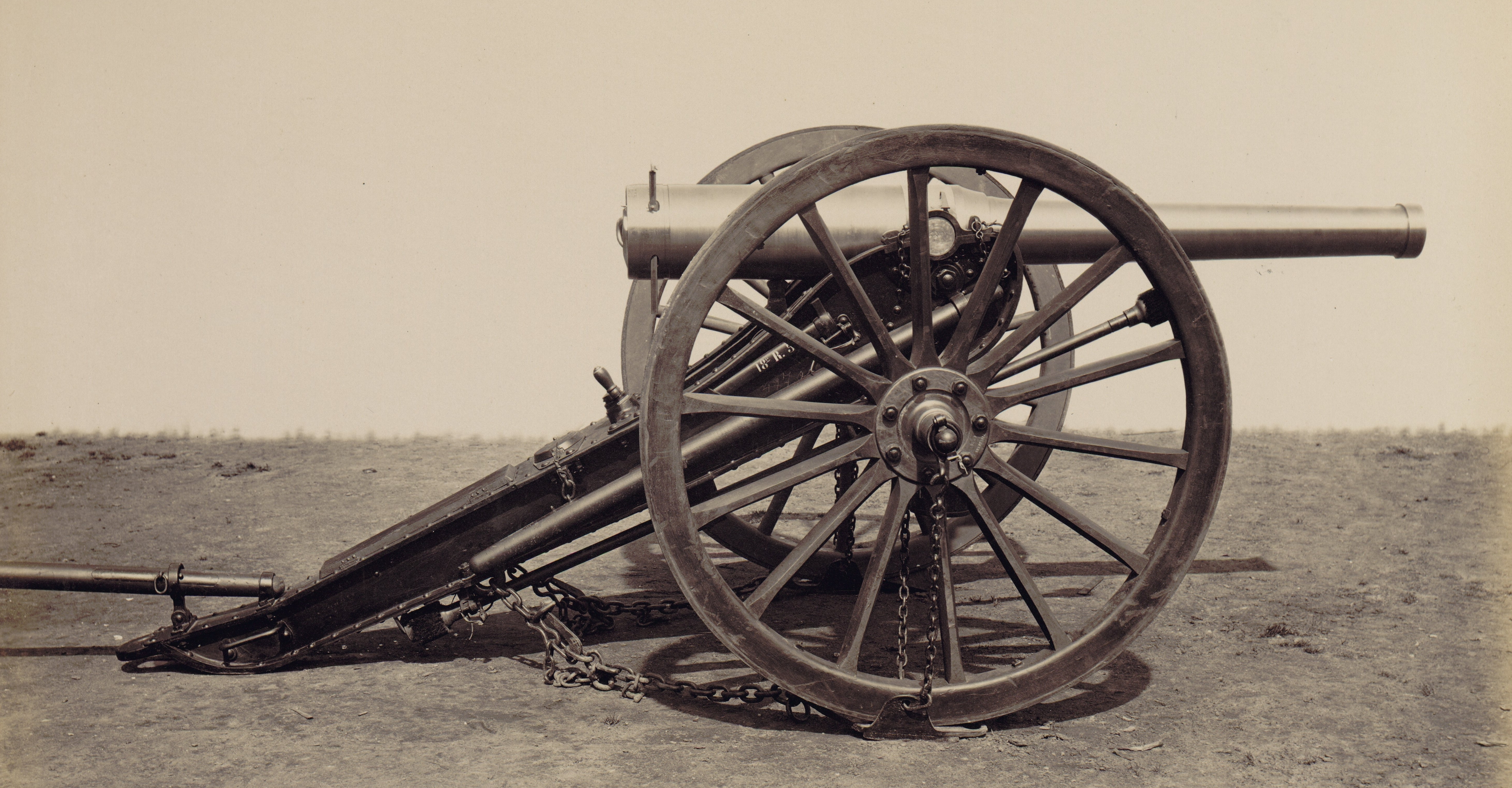
- Type: Field gun
- Place of origin: France

Service history
- In service: 1877–?
- Used by: France
- Wars: World War I, World War II

Production history
- Designer: Charles Ragon de Bange
- Manufacturer: Schneider-Creusot

Specifications
- Mass: Travel: 2,020 kg (4,450 lb); Combat: 1,200 kg (2,600 lb)
- Barrel length: 2.06 m (6 ft 9 in) L/23
- Shell: 8.45 kg (18 lb 10 oz)
- Caliber: 90 mm (3.5 in)
- Breech: de Bange
- Recoil: None
- Carriage: Pole trail
- Elevation: -6° to +25°
- Rate of fire: 2 rpm
- Muzzle velocity: 500 m/s (1,600 ft/s)
- Effective firing range: 7 km (4.3 mi)

The de Bange 90 mm cannon (Mle 1877) was a type of field artillery piece developed in France by Colonel Charles Ragon de Bange in 1877, and adopted by the French Army that same year. It superseded the earlier Reffye cannon (1870/73) and the Lahitolle 95 mm cannon (1875).

== Characteristics ==
The cannon was breech loading and used the original mushroom-shaped obturator system developed by de Bange, allowing to properly seal the breech during each firing. The cannon lacked a recoil system, meaning that the entire carriage moved backward when fired. Before firing again, the cannon had to be moved back into position and re-aimed, which greatly slowed the effective rate of fire. This would remain a problem with all artillery pieces until the development of the Canon de 75 in 1897.

== Replacement ==
The de Bange 90 mm was used during World War I, although it was obsolete by then, as there were important stockpiles of ammunition and French industry fell short of producing enough modern cannons for the war. It was superseded by the Canon de 75.

=== British service ===
A number of these weapons were issued to some third-line British Territorial Force batteries at the start of World War I, for training and home defence duties, because of a shortage of more modern field guns. They were replaced in these units by Ordnance BLC 15 pounder guns, when second-line units were re-equipped with Ordnance QF 18 pounders.

=== Finnish service ===
France donated 100 of these cannons in 1940 during Winter War between Finland and Soviet Union. Only 24 guns arrived before the end of the war and rest during the Interim Peace. When Continuation War begun 84 guns were issued to fortification and coastal units. Finnish troops fired more than 174 000 shots with these cannons during Continuation War and last shots in battle were fired as late as in June 1944.

=== Naval service ===
In addition to its land role the de Bange 90 mm was converted to arm DEMS (Defensively Equipped Merchant Ships) against the U-boat threat during WWI. Conversion began in 1916 and a total of 1,740 guns were given naval mounts of which 1,430 were installed aboard French ships. The British were also offered 400 guns and 300 were converted by EOC for British naval use, with another 200 supplied to the French. The EOC modifications included mounting the gun on a U-shaped gun cradle on an elastic mount similar to the type used by the 6-pounder. The muzzle of the gun was given a counterweight and a hydro-pneumatic recoil mechanism was fitted above the barrel. For aiming a shoulder pad was provided and the gun could be elevated between -10° and +35° with 360° traverse.

== Photo gallery ==
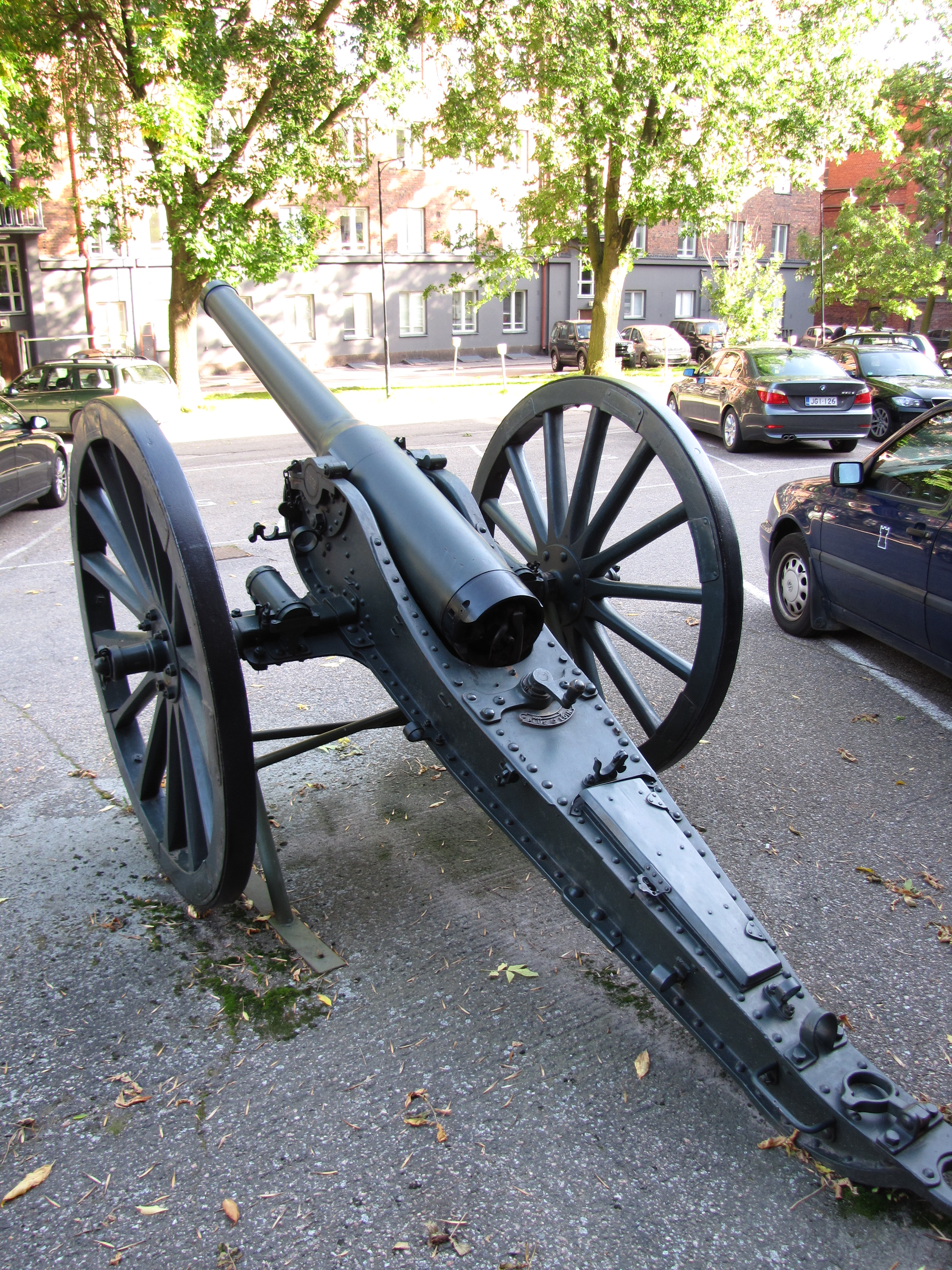
De Bange 90 mm cannon.

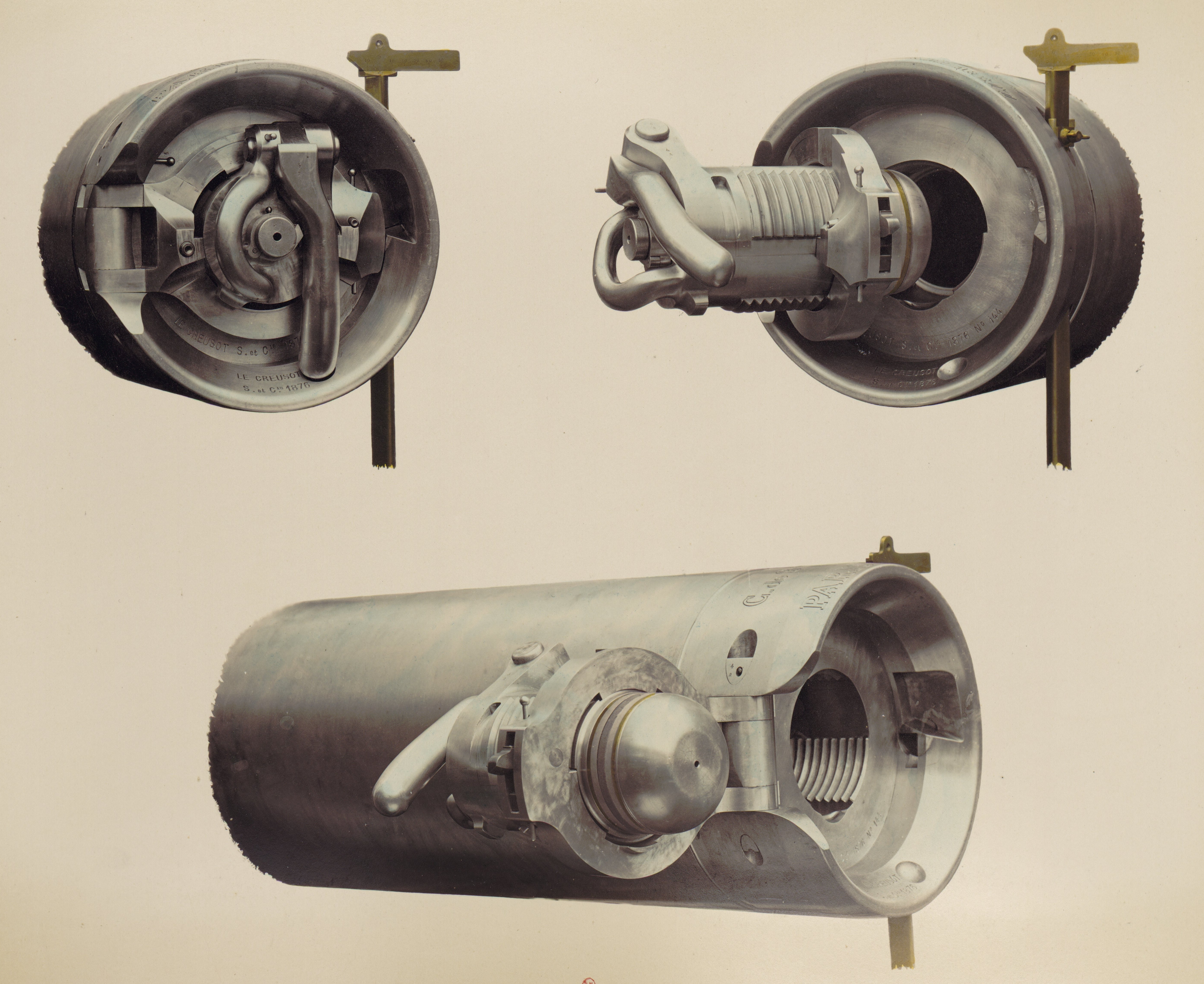
de Bange breech.

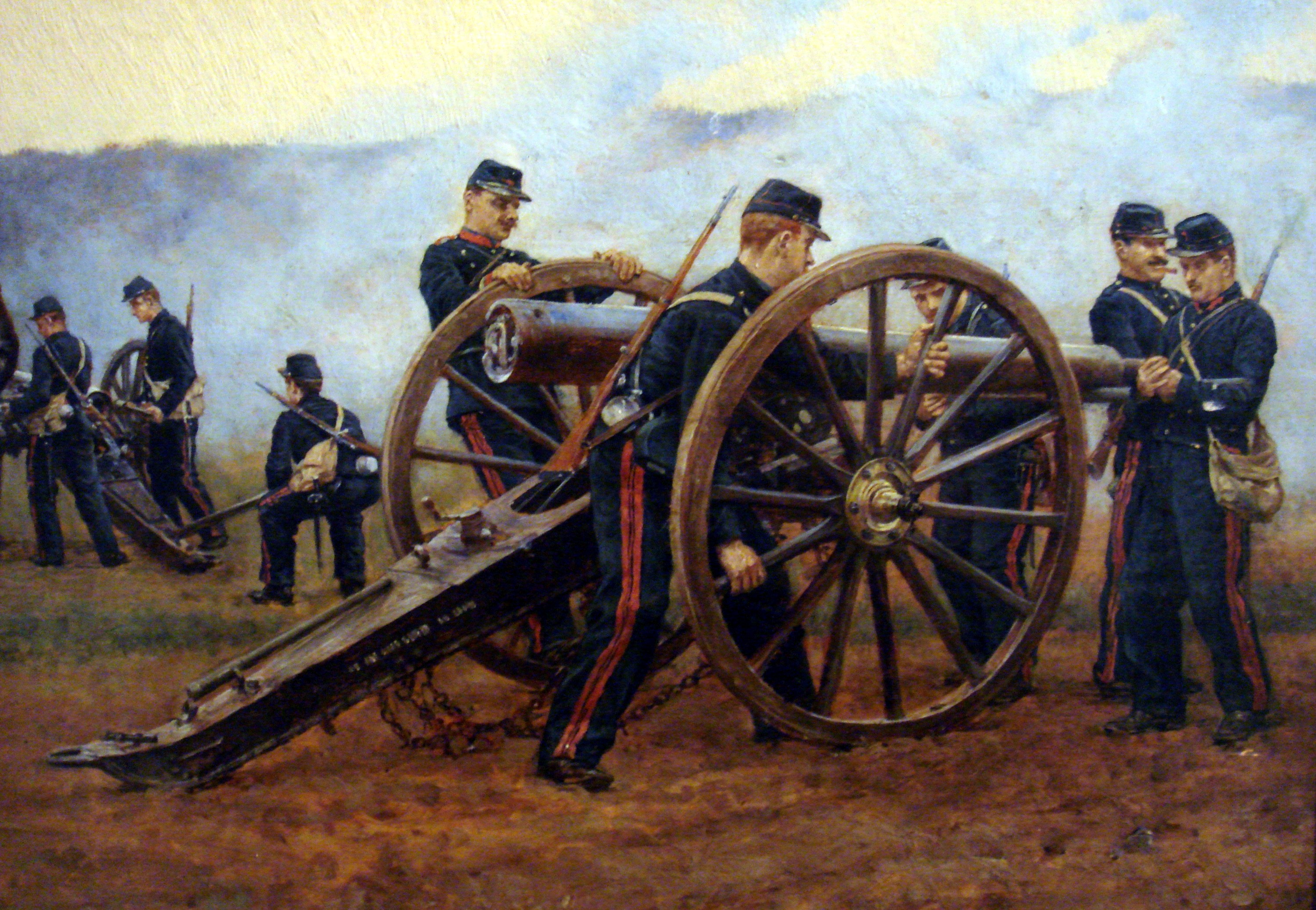
A 90 mm de Bange artillery piece, in 1898. Painting by Etienne-Prosper Berne-Bellecourt (1838–1910). Musée de l'Armée.

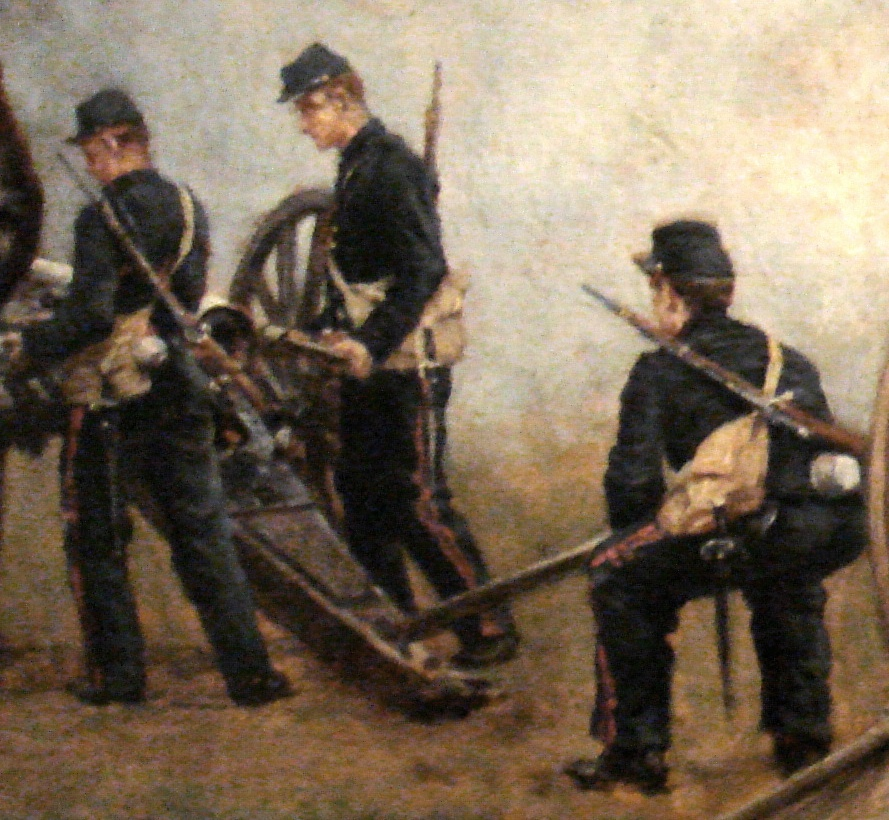
Loading and reaiming of the de Bange 90 mm.
