= Vânători (military unit) =

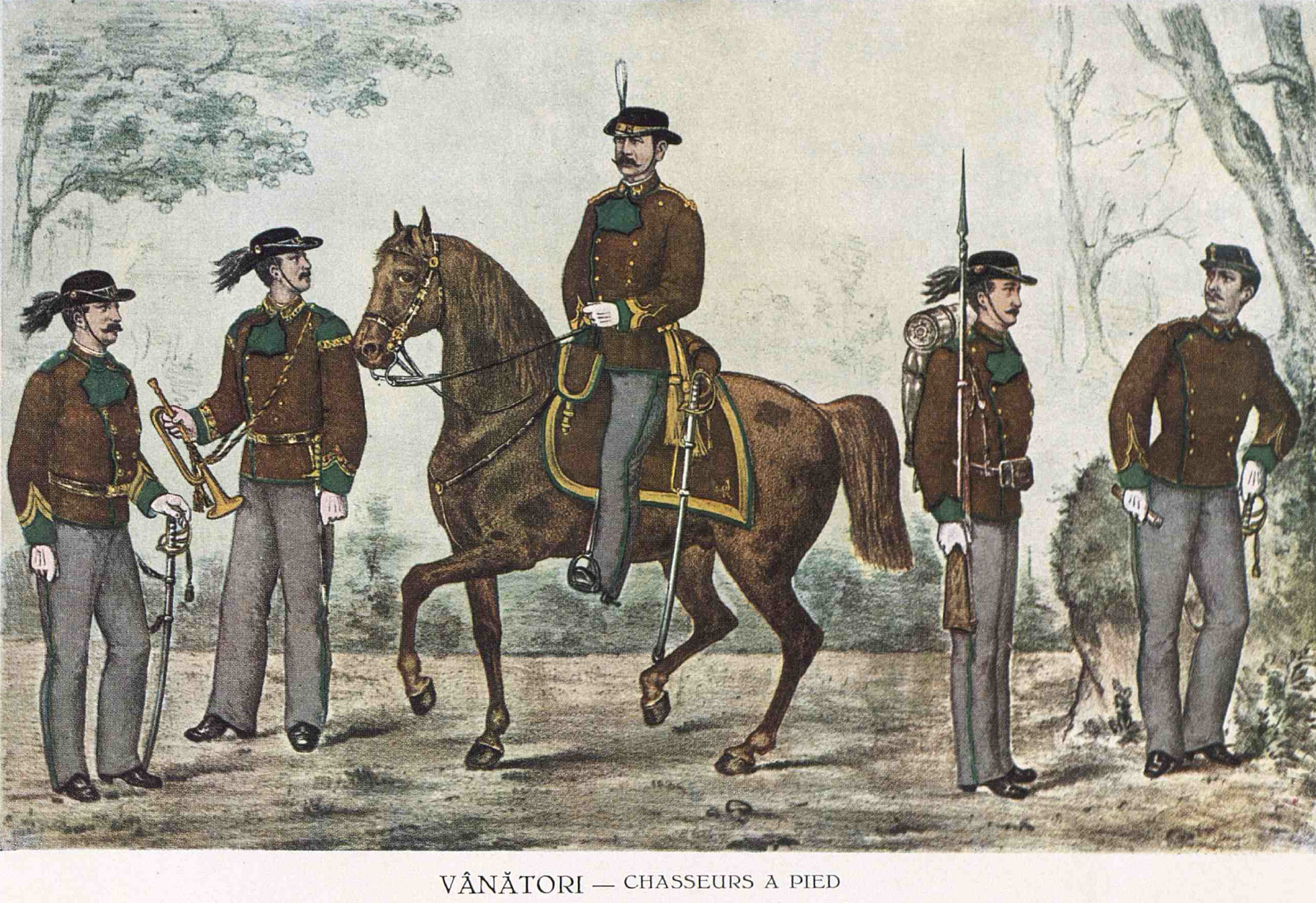
- 1930 drawing of uniforms of the vânători. Reproduced after Albumul Armatei Române, 1873.
- Active: 1860–1947
- Disbanded: 1947
- Country: Kingdom of Romania
- Branch: Romanian Army
- Type: Light infantry
- Size: 10 regiments

The vânători (Romanian pronunciation: [vɨnəˈtorʲ], transl. "Huntsmen") were a light infantry unit of the Romanian Army established on 1 July 1860. Compared to the regular infantry units, the vânători specialized in close combat and high-precision firing on enemy positions, ambush actions, and had greater mobility on the field. In addition, the vânători units also carried out protocol missions and guarded the royal and princely residences in Bucharest, Cotroceni, and Peleș, as well as the headquarters of the Ministry of War.

== History ==
=== Origins ===
The earliest mention of the vânători comes from Hieromonk Gavriil Protul, who noted that Neagoe Basarab was commander of the vânători during the reign of Radu the Great. The vânători originally worked as hunters during peacetime and also defended the border regions, but were also called to the army during wars. Dimitrie Cantemir also noted that the vânători assisted the Prince in his hunts. In Wallachia, the vânători were divided in two categories: one of free men who worked as princely servants, and another of serfs who worked for the boyars. During Matei Basarab's reign, the princely hunters were organized in a ceată and were led by a Vătaf.

In 1739, with the military reforms carried out by Constantin Mavrocordat in Wallachia, two steaguri ("banners") of vânători with two captains, seven zapcii and 165 soldiers were registered. The first steag had 99 soldiers, and the second had 66 soldiers. In 1798, during the reign of Constantine Hangerli, there were 67 princely servants who wore blue clothes and were subordinated to the Spătar, while another 30 vânători were subordinated to the Aga, both units being led by a polcovnic. In 1820, the monthly salary of the polcovnic in service with the spătărie was 30 lei, while for the agie was 25 lei.

In Moldavia, it was noted that in the first reign of Grigore II Ghica, the vânători, called vânători și pușcași ("hunters and riflemen"), had two banners with 55 soldiers each. By the 1760s, there were only 25 vânători and by 1816, six vânători were featured in the treasury register as being exempt from taxes.

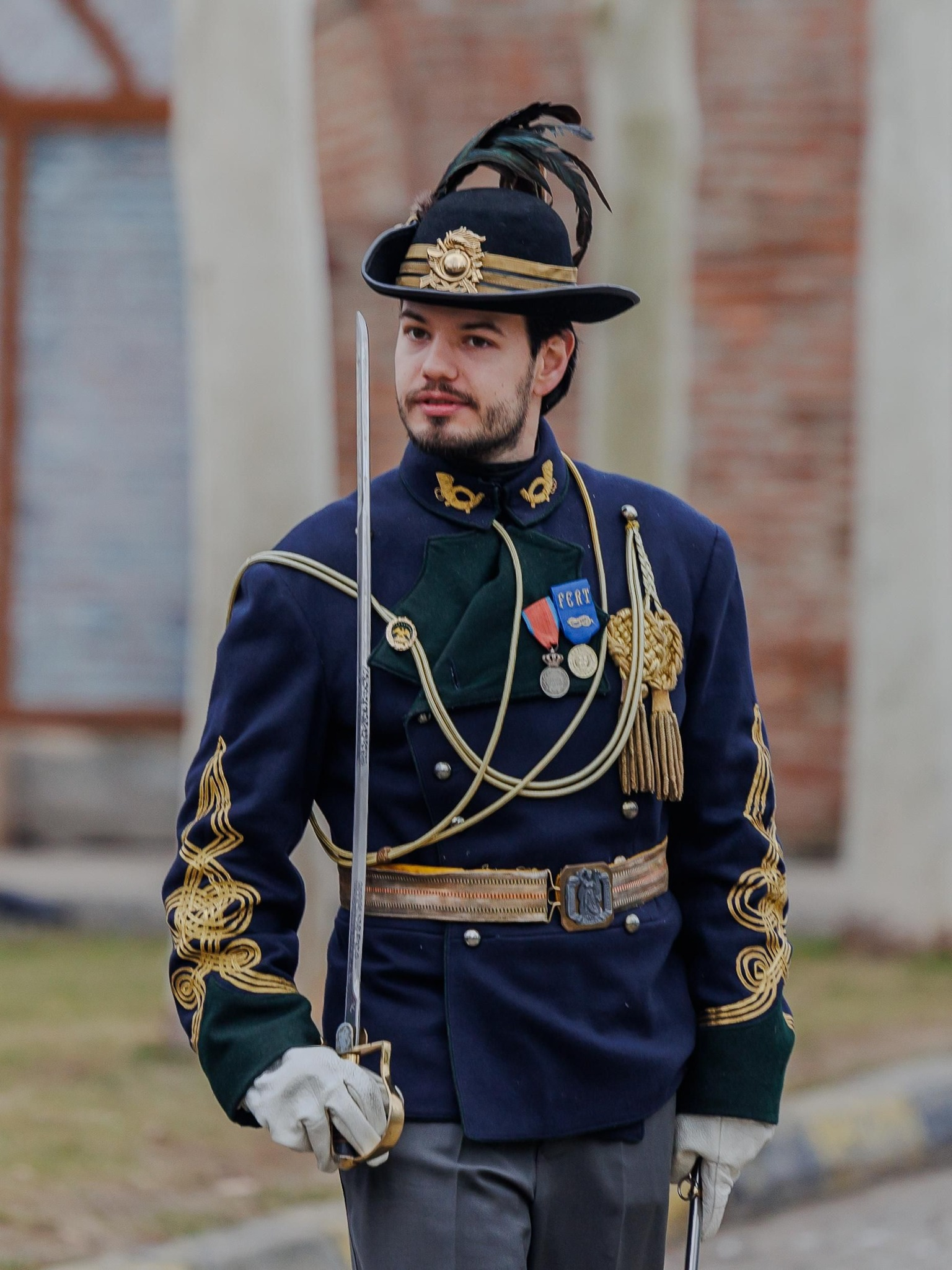
Reenactor wearing an 1860 model vânător uniform

=== After 1859 ===
After the election of Alexandru Ioan Cuza and the Unification of Moldavia and Wallachia, the armies of the two Principalities were reorganized. The rapid homogenization of the military forces of Moldavia and Wallachia led to the merging of the two armies into the new Romanian Army.

One of the first units to be established was the 1st Tirailleur Battalion (Batalionul 1 Tiraliori), on 1 July 1860. Soon after, on 31 August, the battalion was renamed to the 1st Vânători Battalion (Batalionul 1 de Vânători), which was closer to Romanian military traditions. The battalion had eight companies of 100 soldiers. The uniform of the Vânători Battalion was inspired by that of the Italian Bersaglieri. The battalion was led by Major Dimitrie Lecca and it took part in the forced abdication of Alexandru Ioan Cuza. Following Cuza's abdication, in 1866, three more battalions were formed with a similar organization to the 1st Battalion. Over time, the ceremonial role of the vânători was taken by the 2nd Battalion. The Battalion was also given the honorific name "Regina Elisabeta" by King Carol I.

=== Romanian War of Independence ===
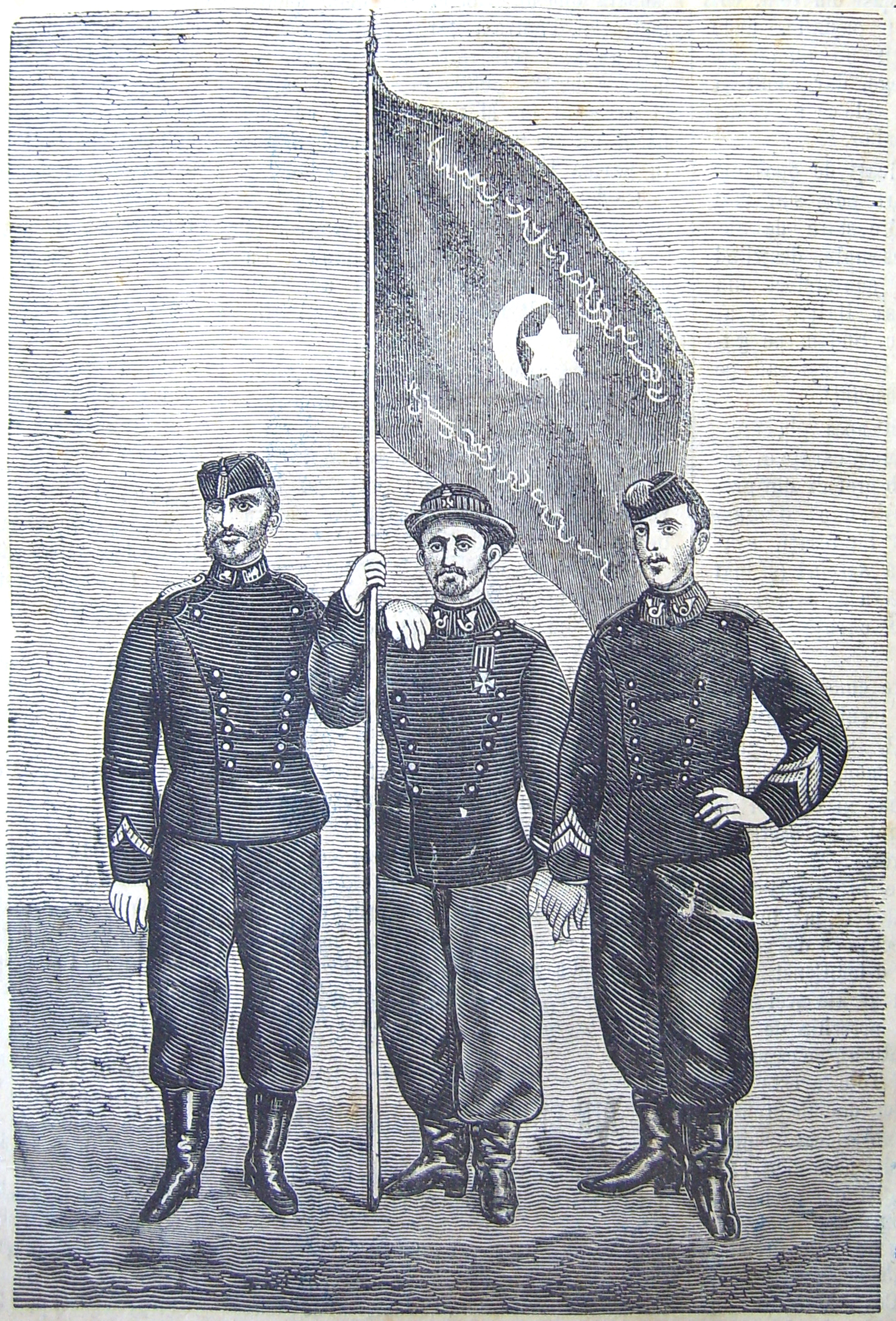
Three vânători with a captured Ottoman flag

During the Romanian War of Independence of 1877, the vânători battalions participated in the Siege of Plevna. The 2nd Battalion in particular, distinguished itself in taking the Grivița 1 redoubt, together with the 14th Dorobanți Regiment. During the battle, three Ottoman cannons and a battle flag were captured.

The soldiers of the vânători battalions were equipped with Peabody rifles and bayonets, similar to regular infantry equipment. The soldiers had two cartridge boxes, one carried in front and the other in the back. The one in the back was used only in the campaign. All leather equipment was colored black. Besides rifles, the battalions also had two types of machine guns in their endowment. Two Christophe-Montigny machine guns were purchased from Austria-Hungary in 1872, and assigned to the 1st and 2nd Battalions, while in 1873 and 1875, two Gatling guns were purchased and entered service with the 3rd and 4th Battalions. Of the four battalions, however, only the 2nd Battalion is known to have used its machine gun during the campaign.

== 20th century ==
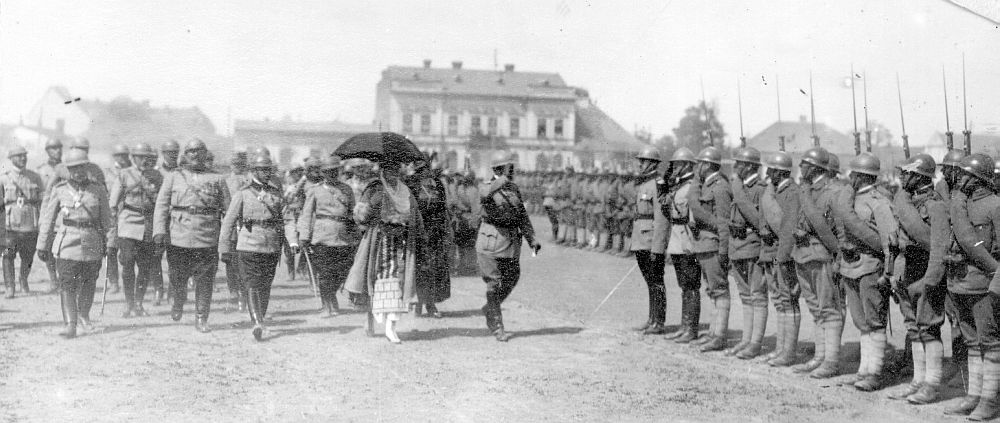
King Ferdinand and Queen Marie inspecting the 2nd Vânători Division in 1919

Following the reorganization of 1888, each division of the Romanian Army had a battalion of vânători. In total, there were 10 battalions, numbered 1 to 10 in reference to the infantry division they were assigned to. When the mobilization for the war started, the battalions were converted to regiments. In January 1918, the 10 regiments were merged in two divisions. The 1st, 2nd, 5th, 6th, and 9th Vânători Regiments together with the 31st Artillery Regiment formed the 1st Vânători Division, while the 3rd, 4th, 7th, 8th, and 10th Vânători Regiments together with the 32nd Artillery Regiment formed the 2nd Vânători Division. The two Divisions participated in the post-war military actions and in the Hungarian–Romanian War in 1919.

In 1931, King Carol II established the title of "guard" units, which was given to elite units tasked with ensuring the protection of great importance areas, such as the Royal Palace. The 2nd Vânători Regiment received this title, and its battle flag was also decorated with the Order of Michael the Brave 2nd Class.

Following the end of the Second World War, and the abdication of King Michael I in late 1947, the vânători units were disbanded.

== See also ==
- Bersaglieri
- Chasseurs
- Jägers
- Vânători de munte

== Bibliography ==
- Neagoe, Claudiu (2018). "Vânătorii domnești în Țara Românească și Moldova". Revista de istorie militară (in Romanian) (1–2). ISSN 1220-5710.
- Pogăciaș, Andrei (March 2016). "Armatele uitate. Trupele Țărilor Române în lungul secol fanariot". Historia Special (in Romanian). No. 14/2016. p. 43. ISSN 2286-0258.
