= Mitrailleuse =

Mitrailleuse de Reffye a.k.a. "Canon a Balles" (1866)
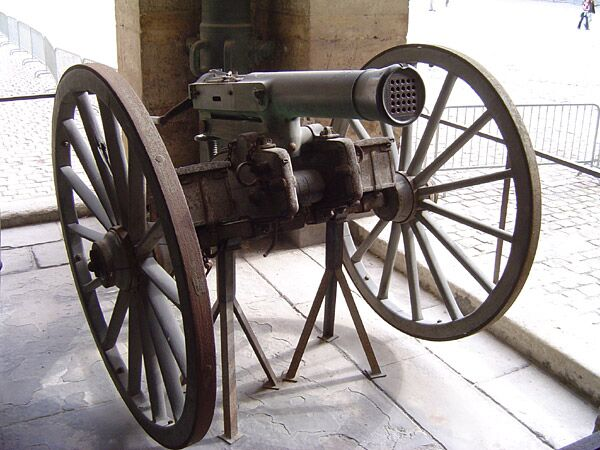
- Reffye mitrailleuse Le Général Hanicque ("Canon à balles modèle 1866"), manufactured in 1867, on display in Les Invalides
- Type: Volley gun
- Place of origin: France

Service history
- In service: 1866–1908
- Used by: France; North German Confederation; Mexico; Kingdom of Dahomey; South African Republic; Dominican Republic
- Wars: Franco-Prussian War; Yaqui Wars; Franco-Hova Wars; United States occupation of the Dominican Republic (1916–1924)

Production history
- Designer: J. B. Verchere de Reffye
- Designed: 1865
- Manufacturer: Meudon and Nantes government facilities
- Produced: 1866–71
- No. built: About 400

Specifications
- Mass: 340 kilograms (750 lb); with carriage: 855 kilograms (1,885 lb)
- Length: 1.75 m (5.7 ft)
- Shell: Elongated shotgun shell configuration, center fire, 50-gram (770 grain) patched bullet
- Caliber: 13 mm (.512 caliber)
- Rate of fire: 125 rounds/minute
- Effective firing range: 1,800 metres (2,000 yd)
- Maximum firing range: 3,400 metres (3,700 yd)

A mitrailleuse (French pronunciation: [mitʁajøz]; from French mitraille, "grapeshot") is a type of volley gun with barrels of rifle calibre that can fire either all rounds at once or in rapid succession. The earliest true mitrailleuse was theorized and proposed in 1851 by Belgian Army captain Fafschamps, ten years before the advent of the Gatling gun. It was followed by the Belgian Montigny mitrailleuse in 1863. Then the French 25 barrel "Canon à Balles", better known as the Reffye mitrailleuse, was adopted in great secrecy in 1866. It became the first rapid-firing weapon deployed as standard equipment by any army in a major conflict when it was used during the Franco-Prussian War of 1870–71.

A steel block containing twenty-five 13 mm (.51 calibre) centre-fire cartridges was locked against the breech before firing. With the rotation of a crank, the 25 rounds were discharged in rapid succession. The sustainable firing rate of the Reffye mitrailleuse was 100 rounds per minute and its maximum range was about 2000 yards (1800 m), a distance that placed their batteries beyond the reach of Prussian Dreyse needle rifle fire. Reffye mitrailleuses were deployed in six-gun batteries and were manned by gunners as a form of special artillery.

Although innovative and capable of good ballistic performance, the Reffye mitrailleuse was a tactical failure because its basic concept and operational use were flawed. Only 210 Reffye mitrailleuses were in existence at the beginning of the Franco-Prussian War in 1870. Their field use was discontinued by the French Army after 1871. After the Gatling gun was replaced in service by newer recoil- or gas-operated weapons, multi-barrelled weapons fell into disuse for many decades. Some examples were developed during the interwar years but only as prototypes or were rarely used. The word mitrailleuse became the generic term for a machine gun in the French language because of its early appearance in the field of weapons, although the mitrailleuse was manually operated.

== Origin ==
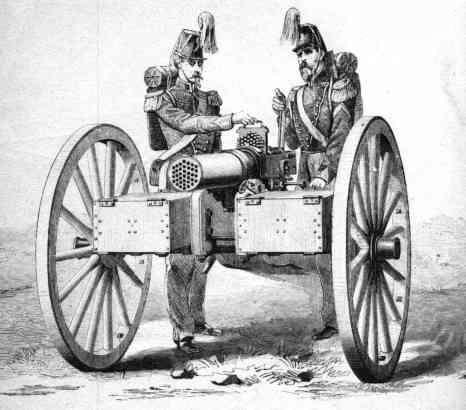
The 37-barrel Montigny mitrailleuse, which was developed in 1863.

The first "mitrailleuse" was a manually fired 50-barrel volley gun. It was developed in Belgium in 1851 by Belgian Army Captain Fafschamps, who made a rough prototype and drawings of his invention. The system was improved during the 1850s by Louis Christophe and the Belgian engineer Joseph Montigny, with the completion of the 37-barrel Montigny mitrailleuse in 1863. From 1859, Joseph Montigny proposed his design to Napoleon III, which led to the development of the French Reffye mitrailleuse, which was designed by Jean-Baptiste Verchère de Reffye in collaboration with Montigny, and which was adopted by the French Army in 1865. Initially kept under wraps as a secret weapon, it was widely used in battle by French artillery during the Franco-Prussian War (1870–71). Smaller numbers of other designs, including the Gatling gun, were also purchased by the French government during the latter part of that conflict. The Reffye model had initially been built in small numbers and in secrecy: only about 200 were available at the beginning of the conflict. This also kept regular French field artillery in a neglected position in the eyes of French emperor Napoleon III, with dire consequences during the Franco-Prussian War of 1870–71.

== Technical characteristics ==
=== Design ===
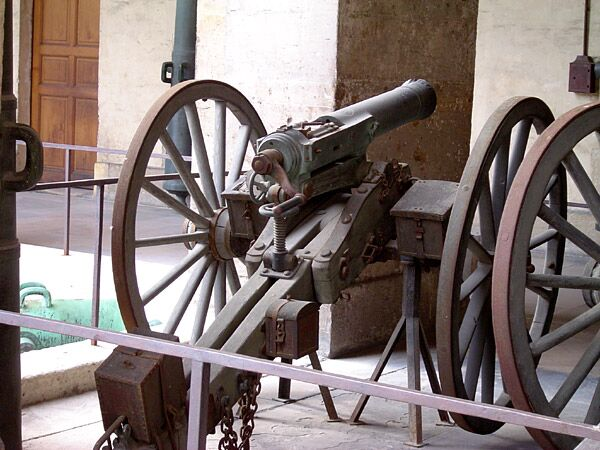
Rear view of 25-barrel Reffye mitrailleuse; Musée de l'Armée

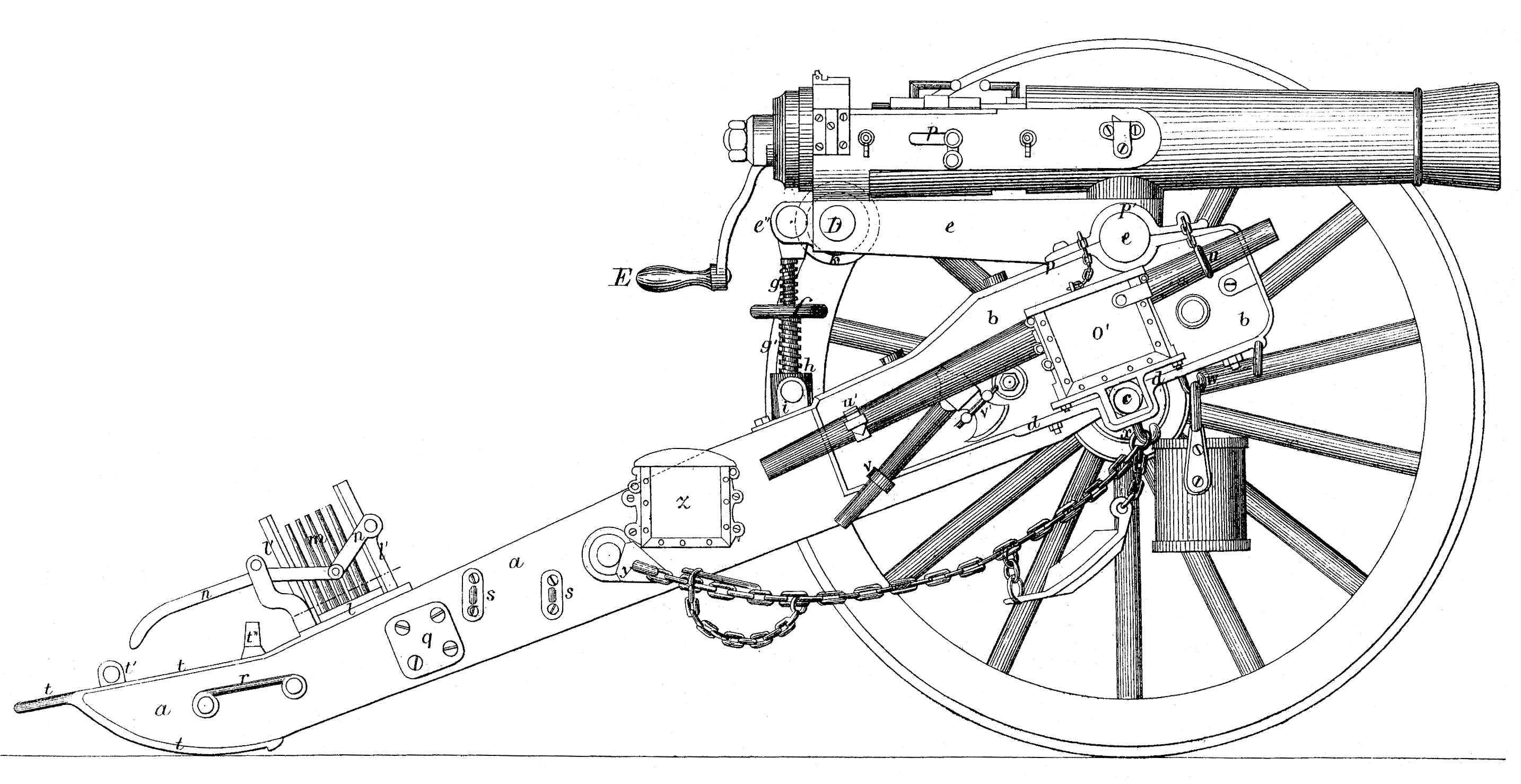
Side plan view of Reffye mitrailleuse, c. 1873

Several variants of the mitrailleuse concept were developed, with common elements to all of their designs. They were characterized by a number of rifled barrels clustered together and mounted on a conventional artillery chassis or (in the case of one model) a tripod. The ammunition was secured in a single block and placed into the breech, behind the open ends of the barrels. All of the barrels were loaded simultaneously by a manual closing lever or large horizontal screw. A second lever could be worked rapidly (or in some models, a crank could be turned) to fire each barrel in succession. This earned the weapon its French nickname of moulin à café (coffee grinder). A very similar name was earned by the hand-cranked, mechanically loaded, continuous-firing, "coffee mill gun" in America during the American Civil War.

The ammunition plate or block had to be removed by hand before another loaded plate could be inserted. Unlike in the Gatling gun and later rapid-firing automatic weapons, the entire loading and firing process was manual. The mitrailleuse's major innovation was that it greatly increased the speed of these processes when compared to standard infantry rifles of the era.

The different variants of the mitrailleuse concept were distinguished by their number of barrels and their different calibers, as the following table summarizes.

Variant name	Barrels	Barrel arrangement	Caliber	Date^{1}	Notes
Fafschamps	50	Clustered		1851	Needle fire, paper cartridges. Prototype and drawings
Christophe-Montigny	37	Clustered	11 mm (0.4 in)	1863	Privately developed and used primarily by the Belgian Army
Reffye	25	In five rows (5 × 5)	13 mm (0.5 in)	1865	Widely used by the French Army during the Franco-Prussian War
Bollée	30	Two circular rings (18 in the outer ring, 12 in the inner)	13 mm (0.5 in)	1870	Used by the French Army of the Loire during the Franco-Prussian War
Chevalier et Grenier	16	Two horizontal rows (2 × 8)	11 mm (0.4 in)	1870	
Gabert	04	Four barrels each with two chambers. While four chambers are in use, four are reloaded.^{2}	11 mm (0.4 in)	1870	Tripod-mounted, unlike the other carriage-mounted variants
Notes: [1] Date developed [2] Translated from the website: www.mitrailleuse.fr/Historique/Aballes/Aballes.htm

Most variants of the mitrailleuse were mounted on an artillery-style carriage. This made them heavy and cumbersome to handle on the battlefield, with gun and carriage weighing up to 900 kg (2,000 lb).

=== Ammunition and firing rates ===
The mitrailleuse's dependence on manual loading meant that its firing rate depended greatly on the skill of its operators. A skillfully manned Reffye mitrailleuse could sustain four volleys (100 rounds) per minute in ordinary operation and reach five volleys (125 rounds) per minute during emergencies. The rapidity of discharge of each individual volley (25 rounds) was controlled by the gunner's action on a small manual crank on the right side of the breech. The weapon's 25 barrels were not discharged all at once, but in rapid succession. Because it was so heavy (1,500 lbs), the Reffye mitrailleuse did not recoil during firing and thus did not need to be re-sighted on its target after each volley. This essential absence of recoil during firings was promoted by Reffye as a considerable advantage over conventional field artillery. Each regular battery of Reffye mitrailleuses lined up six guns firing together, more or less side by side.

The Reffye mitrailleuse used a 13 mm (.512 inch) centerfire cartridge, designed by Gaupillat, which represented the state of the art in ammunition design at the time. It was rather similar to an elongated modern shotgun shell: centerfire with a rimmed brass head and a dark blue hardened cardboard body. The 770-grain (50 g), 13 mm (0.512 inch) patched bullet was propelled by 185 grains (12 grams) of compressed black powder at a muzzle velocity of 1,560 ft/s (480 m/s), three and a half times more powerful than Chassepot or Dreyse rifle ammunition. This was, by far, the most potent rifle caliber ammunition in existence at the time. The Montigny and Reffye mitrailleuse systems were not designed to function with paper cartridges such as the 11 mm Chassepot combustible paper cartridge.

The 13 mm centerfire Reffye mitrailleuse cartridges were loaded into interchangeable steel breech blocks, unlike the Montigny mitrailleuse, whose ammunition was held by the cartridge base in plates. When firing the mitrailleuse, three breech blocks were kept in continuous use: one being fired, one being pressed down on the extractor and one being loaded from a single pre-packaged 25-round box. Adjusting the elevation of the mitrailleuse in accordance to the distance to the designated target was performed with an elevating screw identical to that on a regular artillery piece. The mitrailleuse's barrel could also be moved sideways while firing, to the right and left, in order to adjust for range and provide lateral sweeping fire if needed. The lateral sweep was narrow, however, thus most effective at far distances only. The weapon's field of fire was so narrow that Prussian soldiers were often hit by several bullets at once. During an early engagement of the Franco-Prussian War, at Forbach in Alsace on August 6, 1870, a Prussian general officer (General Bruno von François) was brought down by a very closely spaced volley of four bullets. According to the Prussian regimental record, those four mitrailleuse bullets had been fired from 600 meters away. French artillery attempted to rectify this problem by developing special ammunition capable of firing three bullets from the same cartridge for short-range point-defence.

In summary, the Reffye mitrailleuse was rarely used to deliver sweeping fire at close range like modern machine guns. The mitrailleuse six-gun batteries had been designed to deliver fire on targets too distant to be reached with Chassepot infantry rifles or artillery grapeshot. To fulfill this role, at least during the early weeks of the campaign, the mitrailleuses were deployed together with the older "Napoleon" muzzle loaded field guns ("canon obusier de 12") used by the French Army during the Franco-Prussian War. The mitrailleuse crews are on record of having generally objected to being placed in proximity to regular artillery batteries.

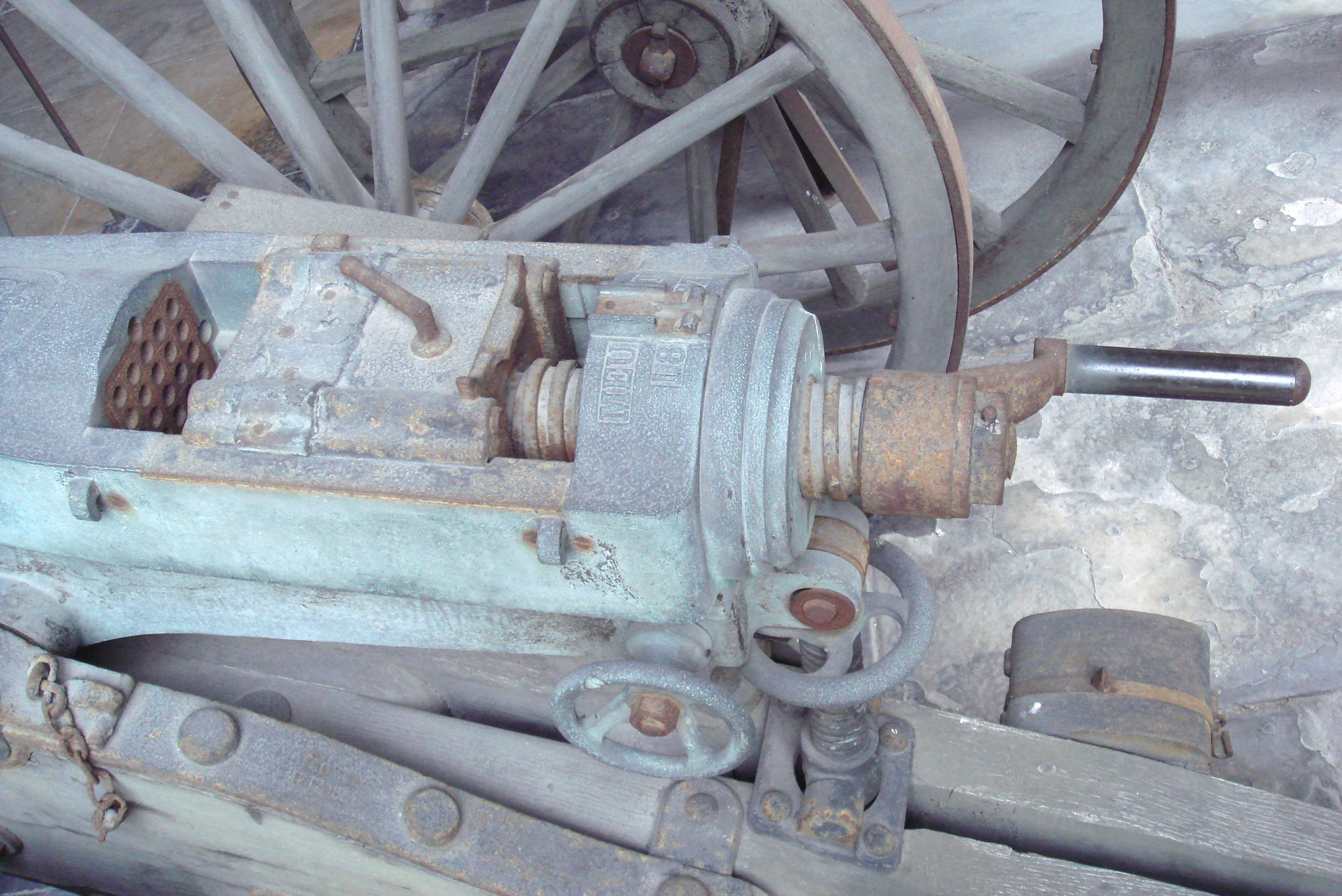
Reffye mitrailleuse mechanism

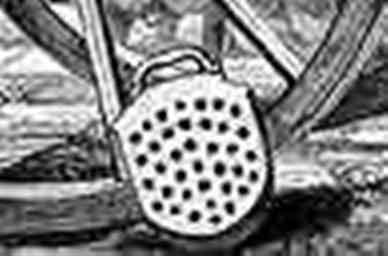
Magazine plate of a Montigny mitrailleuse, designed to hold 37 cartridges and to be slid into the breech before firing

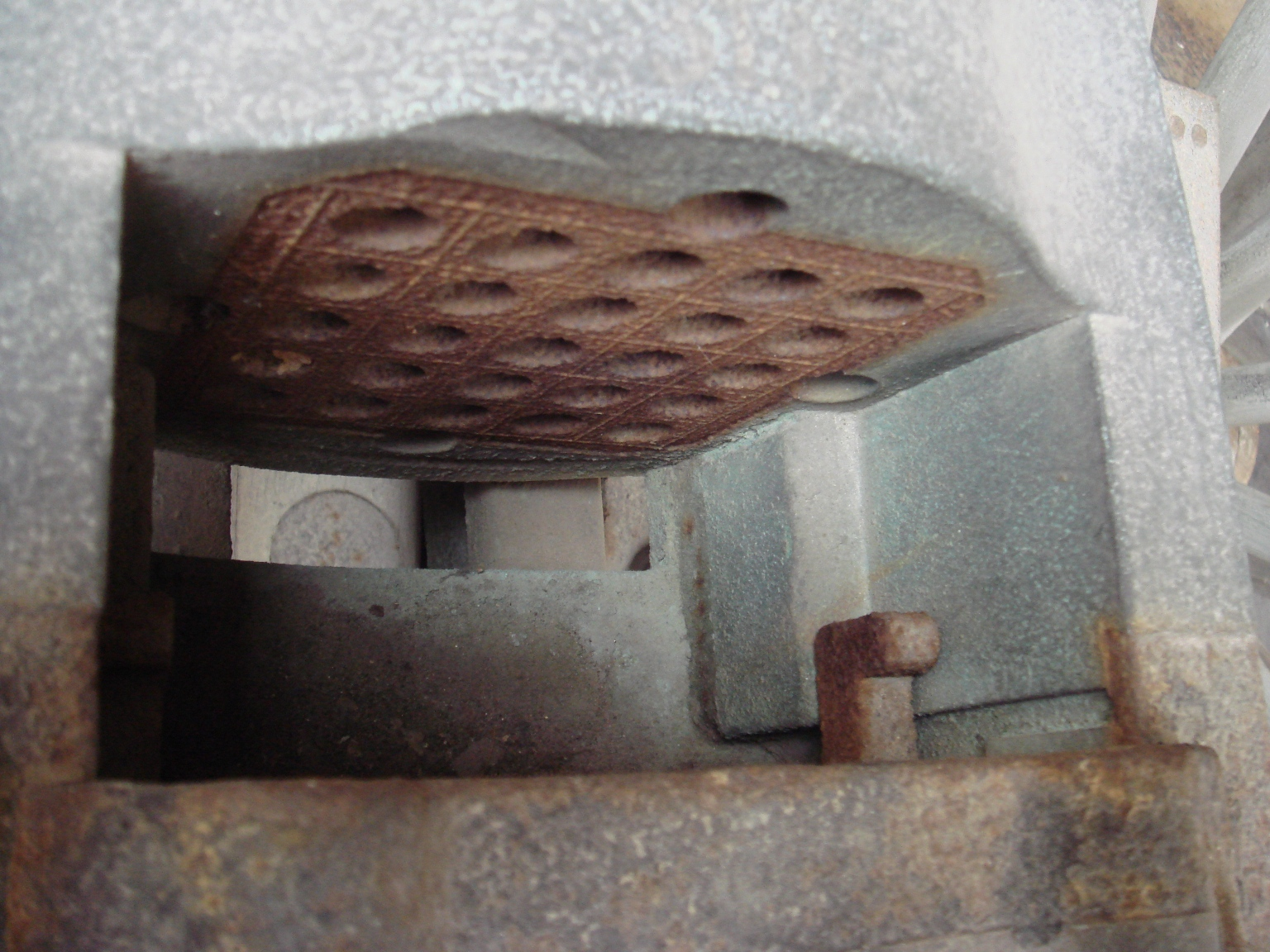
Reffye mitrailleuse bullet magazine housing

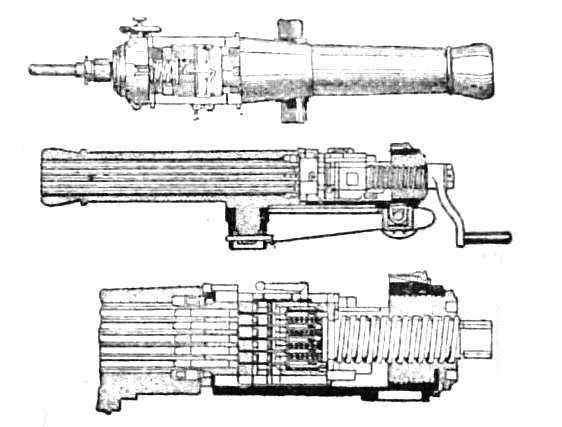
Section of the 25-barrel Reffye mitrailleuse ("Canon à balles"), 1897

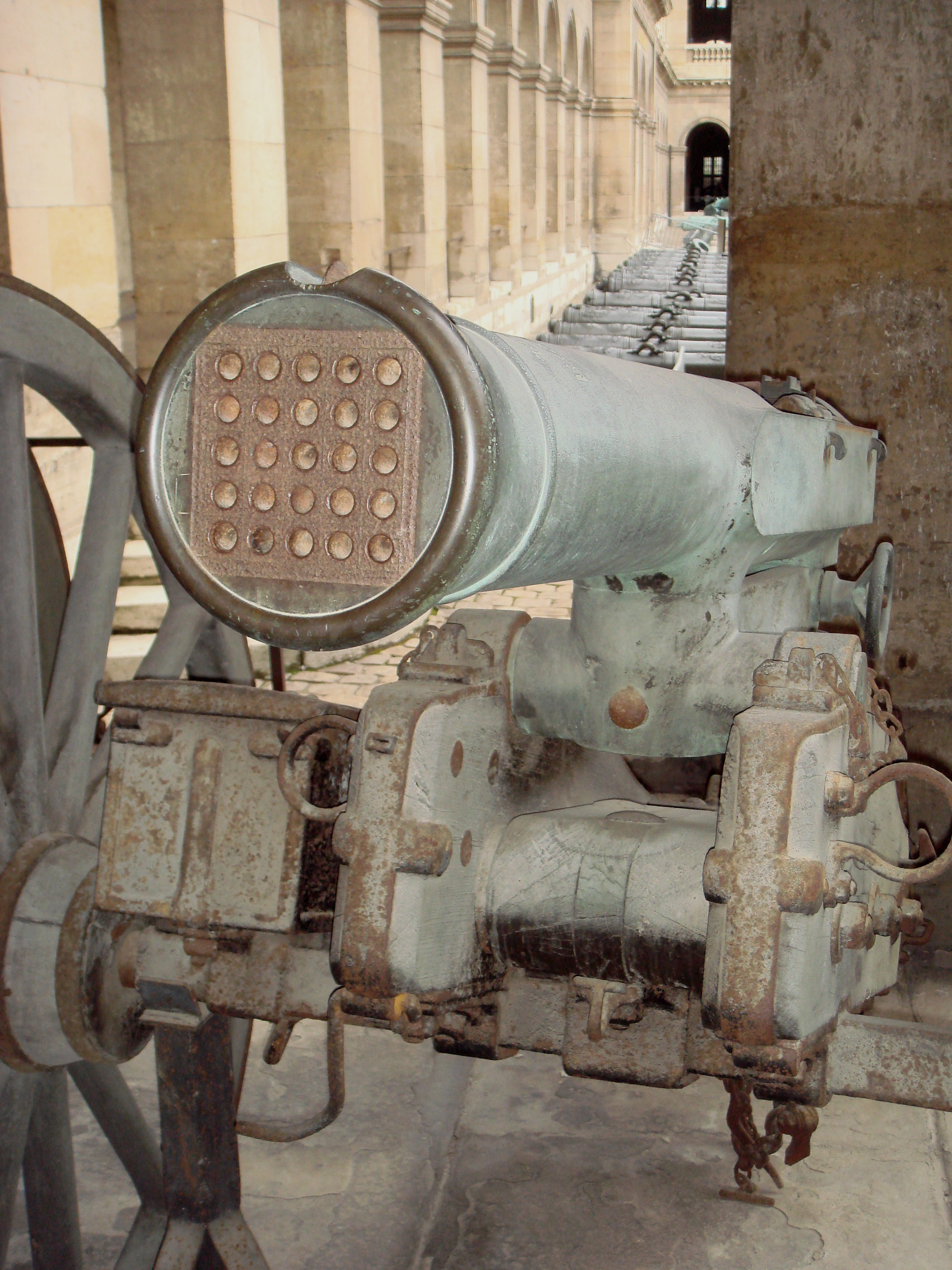
Reffye mitrailleuse muzzle

== Development ==
The mitrailleuse is best known for its service with the French Army but in fact it was first used in Belgium in the 1850s as a static weapon to defend the moats of fortresses. It was a 50-barrel needle fire, paper cartridge weapon which had been designed by a Captain T.H.J. Fafschamps. Then, after 1863, it was improved with only 37 barrels, 11×70mmR centerfire ammunition and the weapon's placement on a wheeled artillery carriage. This transformation was carried out as an industrial venture by Christophe and Joseph Montigny of Fontaine-l'Évêque near Brussels, who sought to sell the new weapon to the rest of Europe.

The French military became interested in the Christophe and Montigny mitrailleuse in 1863 and the French Army's Artillery Committee undertook an investigation into the possible adoption of the Belgian weapon. However it was decided to do otherwise and to create a proprietary mitrailleuse weapon by sole French industrial means. In May 1864, General Edmond Le Bœuf submitted a preliminary report entitled Note sur le Canon à balles to the Emperor Napoleon III. Full-scale manufacture began in September 1865, in great secrecy, under the leadership of Lieutenant-Colonel Verchère de Reffye (1821–1880). Assembly and some manufacturing took place at the workshops in Meudon but many parts came from the private industrial sector. Production was slow due to limited funding (the army had already spent much of its five-year budget on the Mle 1866 Chassepot rifle), forcing Napoleon III to pay for development and manufacture out of secret funds. The new weapon was thoroughly tested in 1868 at the military firing range at Satory, near Versailles, in conditions of great secrecy. Due to a fear of spies, test guns were concealed in tents while being fired at distant targets. The mitrailleuse performed mechanically with remarkable efficiency and much was expected of it in a combat situation.

A total of 215 mitrailleuses and five million rounds of ammunition had been manufactured by July 1870, but only 190 were operational and available for field service when war with Prussia broke out.

== Operational doctrine ==
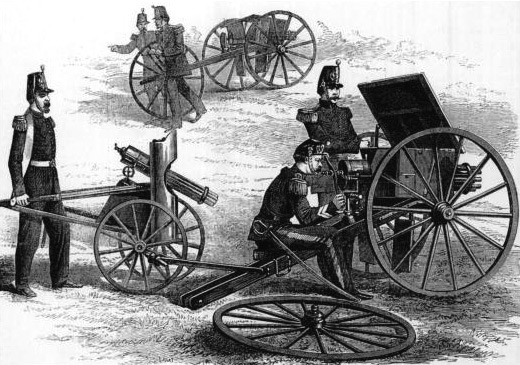
A Bollée mitrailleuse and crew in action, in Franco-Prussian War (Illustration for The Illustrated London News magazine, 13 August 1870)

The French Army used the mitrailleuse as an artillery weapon, rather than an infantry support weapon—a role later filled by the machine gun. As a matter of fact, the official name of the Reffye mitrailleuse in the French Army was "le Canon à Balles", a designation that translates literally as: "cannon that fires bullets":

Comparing the fire of the Mitrailleuse to that of the rifle is misunderstanding the role of the Mitrailleuse. This weapon must begin to fire with effectiveness only at ranges where the rifle no longer carries. It must, for the great ranges of 1000 to 2500 metres compensate the insufficiency of grapeshot.

— Auguste Verchère de Reffye.

Having been developed by the artillery they were, naturally, manned by artillerymen and attached to artillery groups equipped with regular four-pounder field guns. Each mitrailleuse battery comprised six guns, each with a crew of six. One man on the front right fired the gun while another man on the front left swiveled the gun sideways for sweeping fire. The four other men attended to aiming, loading, and unloading. Auguste Verchère de Reffye himself consistently viewed the mitrailleuse as an artillery weapon:

The use of the Mitrailleuse no longer has anything in common with that of normal cannon, the employment and task of this piece deeply modify artillery tactics… Very few officers understand the use of this weapon which, however, is only dangerous by the manner one uses it… The partisans of the mitrailleuse are found among the young who crewed them during the war; but there are far fewer among superior officers.

— Auguste Verchère de Reffye, 1875.

The battlefield use of the mitrailleuse as artillery was a fatally flawed concept. To avoid being hit by Dreyse rifle fire, the mitrailleuse batteries were systematically deployed beyond about 1,400 m (1,500 yards) from the Prussian lines. Although the maximum range of the mitrailleuses was 3,400 m (3,700 yards), the distances at which they were typically engaged rarely exceeded 2,000 m (2100 yards) which was less than the reach of French field artillery. However, accurate fire at 1500 yards was always extremely difficult to achieve with the typical open sights present on the mitrailleuse. For instance, mitrailleuse bullet impacts on the ground could not be observed in the far distance unless enemy ranks had been disrupted by hits from them. It may be noted that modern machine guns are typically used at ranges far shorter than their maximum range—the M60 machine gun, for instance, is normally used well within its effective range of 1,100 m (1,200 yards), compared to its maximum range of 3,725 m (4,074 yards). The mitrailleuse, by contrast, was often used at the outer edges of its range and without the benefit of optical range finding equipment. These deficiencies in the operational usage of the Reffye mitrailleuse proved disastrous in the Franco-Prussian War.

== Use in war ==
=== Franco-Prussian War (1870–71) ===
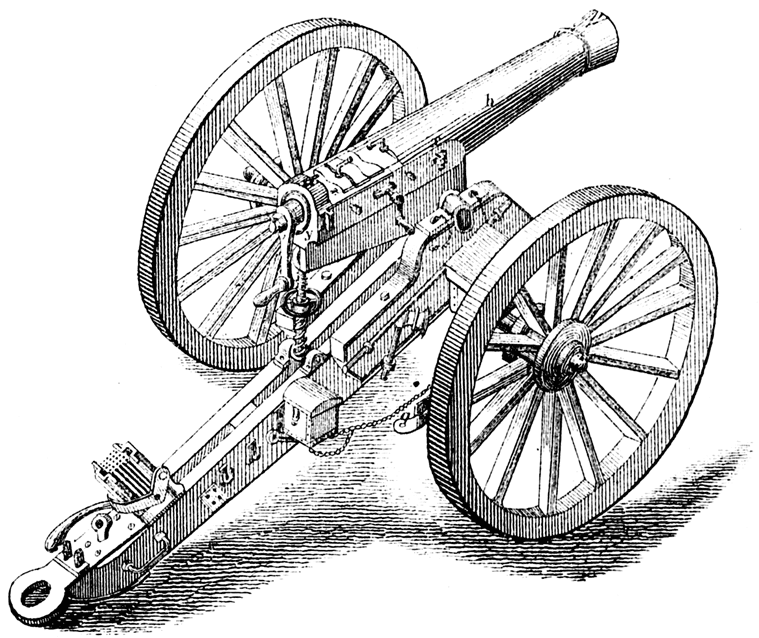
View of a Reffye mitrailleuse prepared for action (drawing from 1873)

Mitrailleuses were used in many of the major engagements of the Franco-Prussian War (1870–71), but their small numbers greatly restricted their effectiveness. Their flawed usage was a serious problem on the battlefield. While the mitrailleuses were inherently accurate, in a ballistic sense, they were often unable to zero in on targets quickly enough at great distances. Individual 25 round salvos were also too tightly grouped and lacked lateral dispersion. To make matters worse, the complex firing mechanism was vulnerable to damage at the hands of inexperienced crews. Fouling of the mechanism by black powder combustion residues and thus difficulties in closing the breech were reported as a problem after prolonged firings.

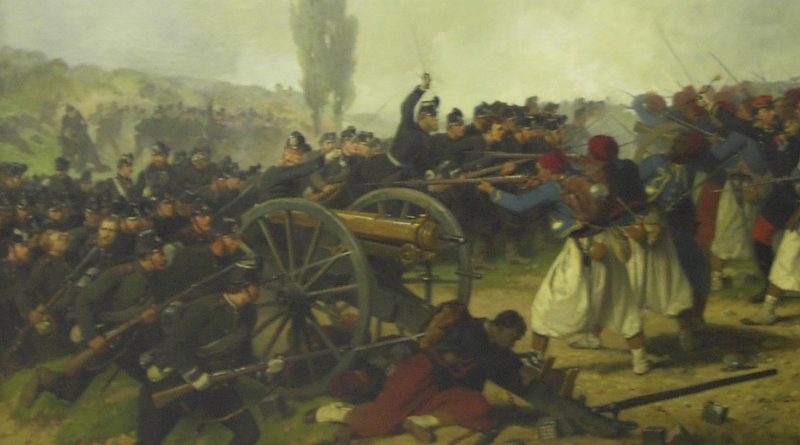
A Reffye mitrailleuse position being stormed during the Franco-Prussian War

In a few instances where the Reffye mitrailleuses were put to good use, they showed that they could have a significant impact. Captain Barbe's mitrailleuse battery at the Battle of Gravelotte devastated massed Prussian infantry when they had quickly found the range on their targets, contributing to the exceptionally high Prussian death toll in that battle. Other examples of effective mitrailleuse fire have also been described for the battle of Mars-la-Tour. For the most part, however, mitrailleuses proved ineffective. It was concluded after the war that Chassepot rifle fire had caused a far greater number of Prussian casualties than the Reffye mitrailleuses. However, about 100,000 Chassepot rifles were engaged in combat in contrast with fewer than 200 Reffye mitrailleuses used in battle at any given time.

The Prussians and foreign observers were not impressed by the performance of the mitrailleuse. In the case of the Prussians, their views were undoubtedly coloured by propaganda. They had very few machine guns or volley guns of their own and, not least for reasons of maintaining morale in the face of a new weapon technology, they scorned the effectiveness of the mitrailleuse. They nonetheless saw the weapon as a threat and Prussian artillery always made it a priority to engage and destroy mitrailleuse batteries. The weapon's characteristic "snarling rasp" does appear to have made some impression—the Prussian troops called the mitrailleuse the Höllenmaschine ("Hell/Infernal Machine")

Its failure to have much effect in the field led to a belief that rapid-fire weapons were useless. United States Army General William Babcock Hazen, who observed the war, commented that "The French mitrailleuse had failed to live up to expectations. The Germans hold it in great contempt, and it will hardly become a permanent military arm." Strictly speaking, manually operated volley guns such as the Reffye mitrailleuse were a technological dead-end, and they were soon replaced by fully automatic machine guns.

After Napoleon III's abdication following the disastrous French defeat in the Battle of Sedan, French war powers fell into the hand of a republican government led by Léon Gambetta. He vigorously organized national defense and the continued manufacture of war equipment. Most of the conventional weapon manufacturing was located in provincial France, but some mitrailleuse repair and even construction continued inside Paris during the city's four-month siege. The Prussians produced a technical report titled "Die französische Mitrailleuse" examining the captured French volley guns, used mitrailleuse type weapon of the Bavarian Army.

The manufacture of the mitrailleuse and its ammunition was resumed under the direction of De Reffye in the coastal city of Nantes in western France. An additional 122 mitrailleuses were manufactured in Nantes to replace the nearly 200 mitrailleuses that had already been destroyed or captured.

=== After the war ===
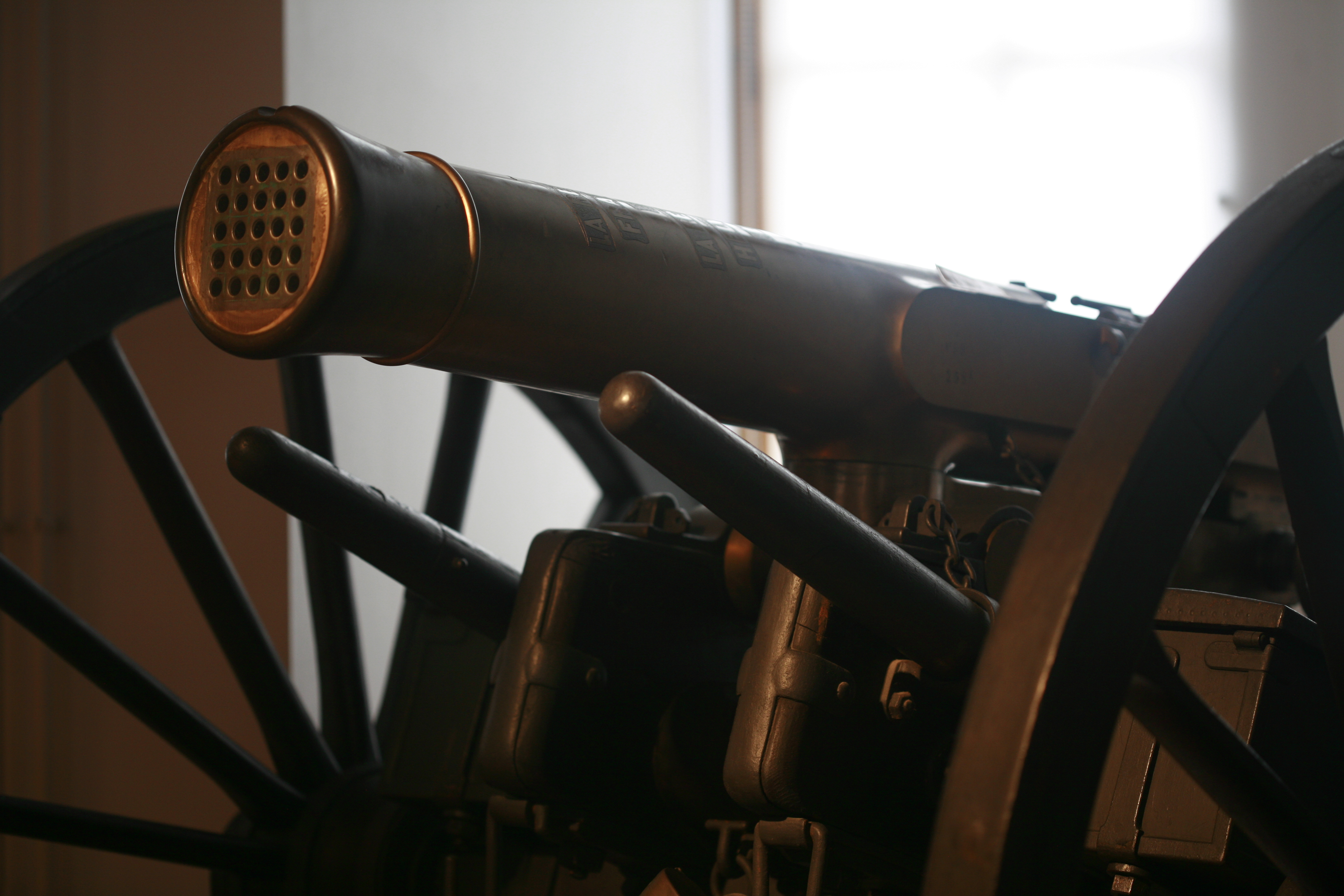
Mitrailleuse donated by the French Republic to Switzerland

After the armistice with Prussia in May 1871, one of the last recorded uses of Reffye mitrailleuses was by troops under the command of Adolphe Thiers, when a battery executed captured Communards in the Bois de Boulogne, following the suppression of the Paris Commune. Similar incidents involving the Reffye mitrailleuse are reported to have taken place at the Caserne Lobau, a barracks in the center of Paris.

A fairly large number of the French Army's Reffye mitrailleuses (268 altogether) survived the Franco-Prussian War. An additional 122 Reffye mitrailleuses, which had been captured during the 1870–71 campaign, were all sold back to France by Germany through a London military surplus dealer in 1875. By 1885, many of the mitrailleuses in the overall remaining French inventory were designated to static point-defence duties, for the purpose of providing flanking fire in the moats of eastern French fortifications. The last surviving Reffye mitrailleuses were removed from several forts in eastern France as late as 1908 and scrapped.

=== Other campaigns ===
The mitrailleuse is reported to have been used by the Mexican Federal Forces against the Yaqui Indian forces in Sonora, then under the command of Cajemé José Maria Leyba, a prominent leader of that tribe from 1874 to 1887. Three mitrailleuse were used in March, 1886, with two mitrailleuse under the command of the forces of Generals Leiva and Carillo, and one under the command of General Camano.

In September 1926, the Mexican military, at first just under General Miguel Pina, made preparations to use the mitrailleuse against the Yaqui people in Sonora, then led by their military chief Luis Matus (Matius in some later accounts), and his lieutenant, Albin Cochemea. The 1st, 8th, and 18th infantry battalions prepared to bring a more modern state of warfare against the indigenous inhabitants of Vicam and other Yaqui pueblos along the river. By October 5, after intense fighting, the remaining Yaqui soldiers had retreated to the mountains above the river, and the Mexican forces decided to mount a vast offensive against them. More than 12,000 Mexican Federal troops, under the command of General Obregon, General Abundio-Gomez, and General Manzo, directed the operations against the remaining Yaqui forces, using munitions that included 8mm mitrailleuse, and aeroplanes carrying poison gas.

Following their campaign against Arabi Pasha in Egypt during 1882, the British recorded having seized several mitrailleuses. None of these seemed to have been used in combat.

Even the Kingdom of Dahomey had some of these guns.

== Impact on military development ==
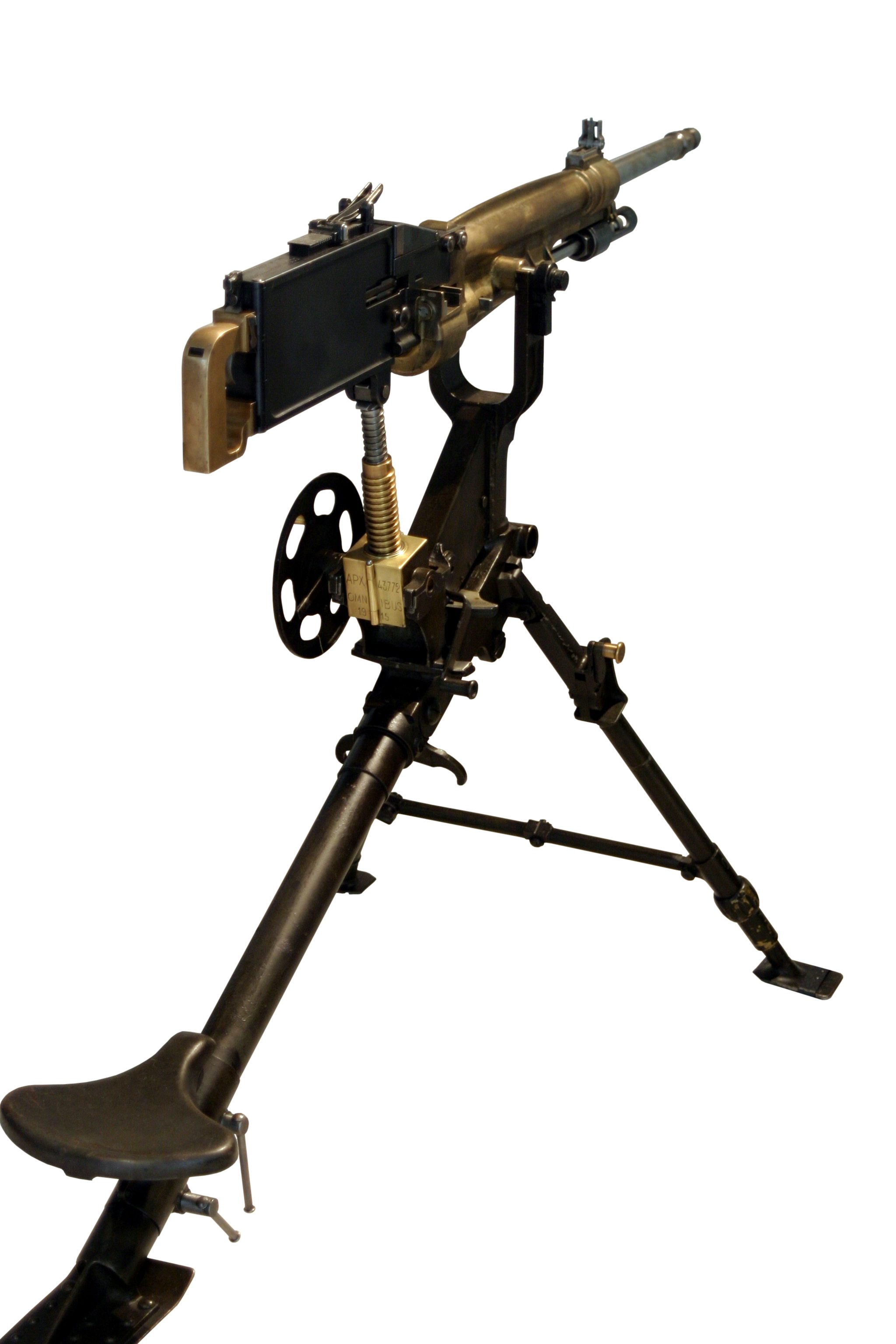
The St Etienne Mle 1907 machine gun

The long-term effects of the mitrailleuse's poor performance have been the subject of some dispute among historians. In Machine Guns: An Illustrated History, J. Willbanks argues that the weapon's ineffectiveness in the Franco-Prussian War resulted in long-standing opposition among European armies to adopting machine gun weapons, particularly in Continental Europe. It is true that the French Army did not adopt an automatic machine gun until 1897, when they chose the Hotchkiss machine gun, later to be followed by the Hotchkiss M1914 machine gun. The French armed forces also adopted another automatic machine gun, the St. Étienne Mle 1907. It has been suggested that the relative slowness displayed by the French services to adopt machine guns was the result of wariness occasioned by the failure of the mitrailleuse. There is some evidence for that suggestion, as the Maxim gun had repeatedly been tested by the French armed services ever since its inception.

In the immediate aftermath of the war, the French put a much greater emphasis on improving their field artillery. The failure of French artillery during the 1870–71 campaign served as a strong incentive to fast track the De Bange field artillery piece (1877) and eventually the well-known Canon de 75 modèle 1897 field gun. At a normal 15 shells per minute rate of fire, one single 75 mm gun could deliver 4,350 lethal shrapnel balls within one minute, up to 6 km away, versus the 75 bullets per minute that were delivered at up to 2 km distance by one Reffye mitrailleuse. Evidently, weapon system efficiency had increased by two orders of magnitude in 30 years.

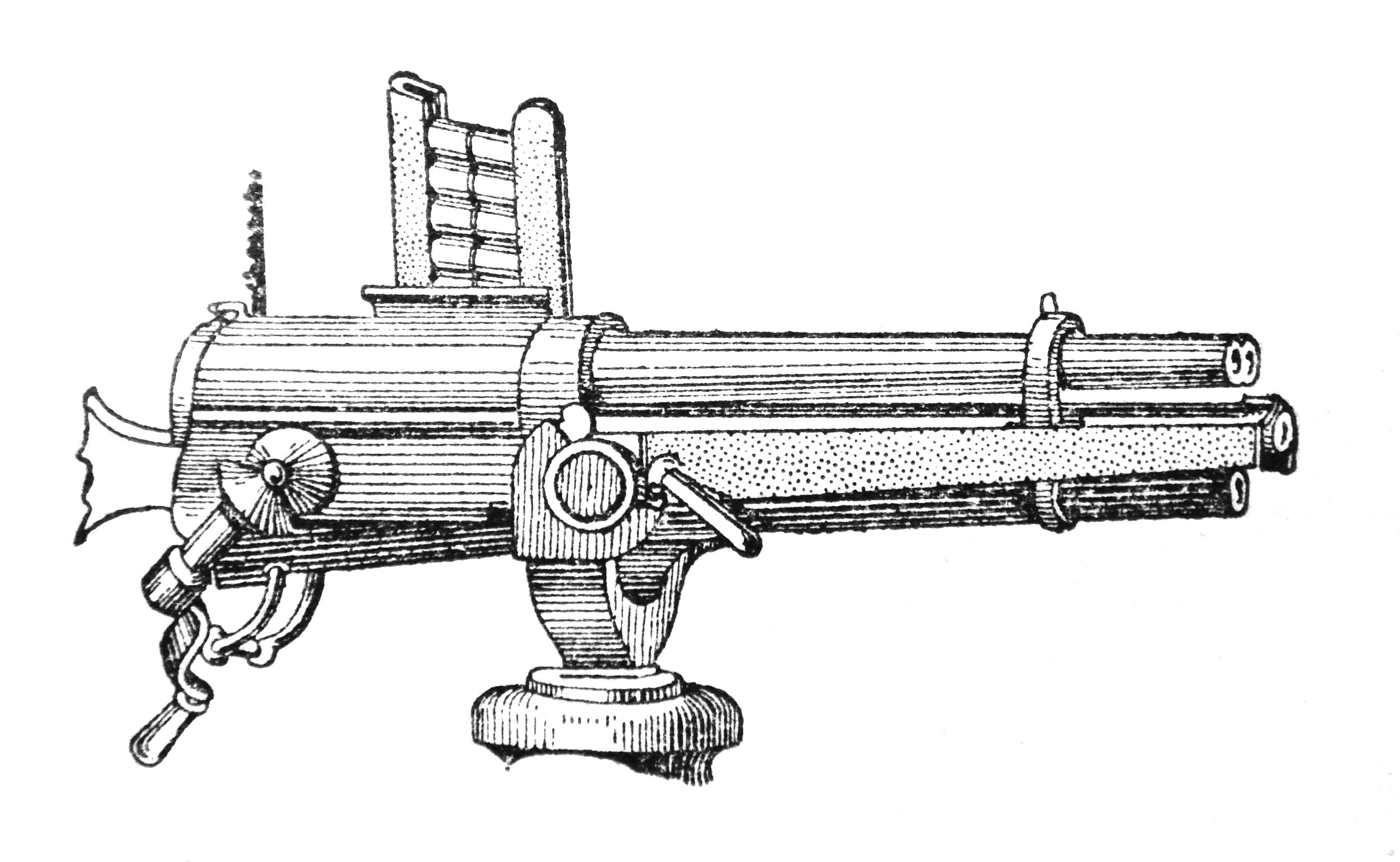
The Hotchkiss rapid fire 37 mm multi-barrel gun "canon-revolver", manufactured from 1879.

Despite such improvements in longer-range artillery, there still remained a need to develop better short- and medium-range infantry support weapons. During the period from 1871 to the 1890s, a variety of new European- and American-designed manual machine guns were adopted by many European armies. Large numbers of Gatling guns were purchased from the United States and were used by Western European powers in colonial wars in Africa, India, and Asia. Twenty-five Gatling guns also saw active service in French hands during the Franco-Prussian war, in early 1871. They performed particularly well at an engagement at Le Mans in western France. Furthermore, the French armed services purchased, for their navy and eastern fortifications, a large number of manual, rapid fire 37 mm multi-barrel guns (so-called Hotchkiss "canon-revolvers") made in France after 1879 by the firm of American expatriate Benjamin B. Hotchkiss. By the 1890s however, European armies began to retire their Gatling guns and other manual machine guns in favor of fully automatic machine guns, such as the Maxim gun, the Colt–Browning M1895, and, in 1897, the Hotchkiss machine gun. Such weapons became universal—and notorious—with the outbreak of the First World War in 1914.

=== Modern uses of the term mitrailleuse ===
A machine gun is still referred to as a mitrailleuse in French, following the pattern set by the adoption of the Mitrailleuse Hotchkiss in 1897. The FN 5.56 mm NATO machine gun, the Minimi, derives its name from the term Mini-Mitrailleuse, "small machine gun". Submachine guns may be called mitraillettes, the diminutive of mitrailleuse, although they are also called pistolets mitrailleurs ("mitrailleuse pistols"). The term mitraillette was later applied to a type of sandwich native to Belgium.

In Dutch as spoken in the Netherlands, the word mitrailleur is widely used as a synonym for machinegeweer (machine gun). Obviously, this word is derived from the original mitrailleuse by changing the gender of the French word. In Dutch-speaking parts of Belgium, however, the word mitrailleur is rarely used, largely because the former is regarded as poor French.

The term is also used in Norwegian. Although spelled slightly differently as mitraljøse, the pronunciation is similar. In Norway, the term nowadays is used to refer to a machine gun (the MG3, labeled as mitr-3, to be specific) mounted on a tripod. This is similar to the German term Schweres Maschinengewehr, which refers to a regular machine gun mounted on a tripod (since the introduction of general purpose machine guns).

In Turkish the term mitralyöz, which is apparently derived from mitrailleuse, was widely used as a synonym for machine guns before becoming an archaic term. Currently, makineli tüfek (machine rifle) is considered the accepted term.

A related word, metralhadora, is used in Portuguese. Although it is derived from the French mitrailleuse, its pronunciation is different. It describes any automatic firearm. Similarly, in Spanish ametralladora is the word for a machine gun, metralleta, connected to French mitraillette for a sub-machine gun.

The word also survived in Romania, where the generic term for a machine gun is mitralieră. In Slovenian, Croatian and Serbian it is mitraljez, and in Albanian a machine gun is referred to as mitraloz. In Greek, mydraliovolo (μυδραλιοβόλο) is a—now somewhat archaic—term for a machine gun.

The word mitrailleuse is surely the source for the modern Italian term mitragliatrice, describing a machine gun, as well.

== Preserved mitrailleuses ==
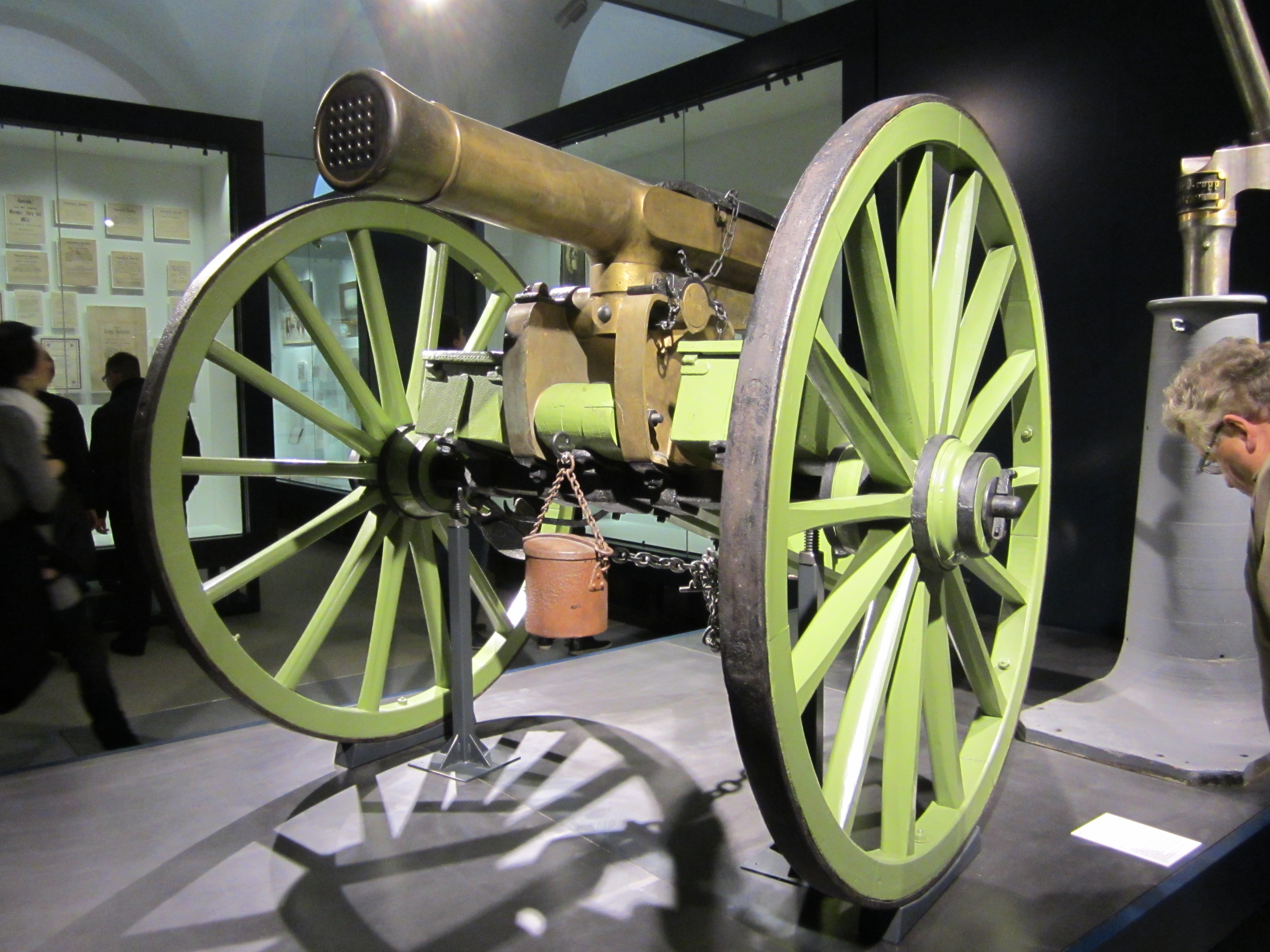
A mitrailleuse in the Bundeswehr Military History Museum, Dresden, Germany

- Musée de l'Armée in the Hotel Des Invalides. Two mitrailleuses long mounted outdoors thus severely affected by rust.
- Musée royal de l’Armée et d'Histoire Militaire in Brussels
- Musee Militaire Vaudois, 1110, Morges, Switzerland. Complete Reffye mitrailleuse in exceptional like-new condition.
- Dreiecklandmuseum, 79423, Heitersheim (near Freiburg im Breisgau), Germany
- Parade Hall, Spandau Citadel, Berlin, Germany. A mitrailleuse manufactured in 1867, named after General Bosquet, is on exhibition inside the armory.
- Bundeswehr Military History Museum in Dresden, Germany. See figure to the right.
- Polish Army Museum in Warsaw, Poland. A mitrailleuse named after general Louis Pailhou.
- Coronado Star Park on Coronado Island, CA. Donated to the city by Major General Joseph Henry Pendleton.

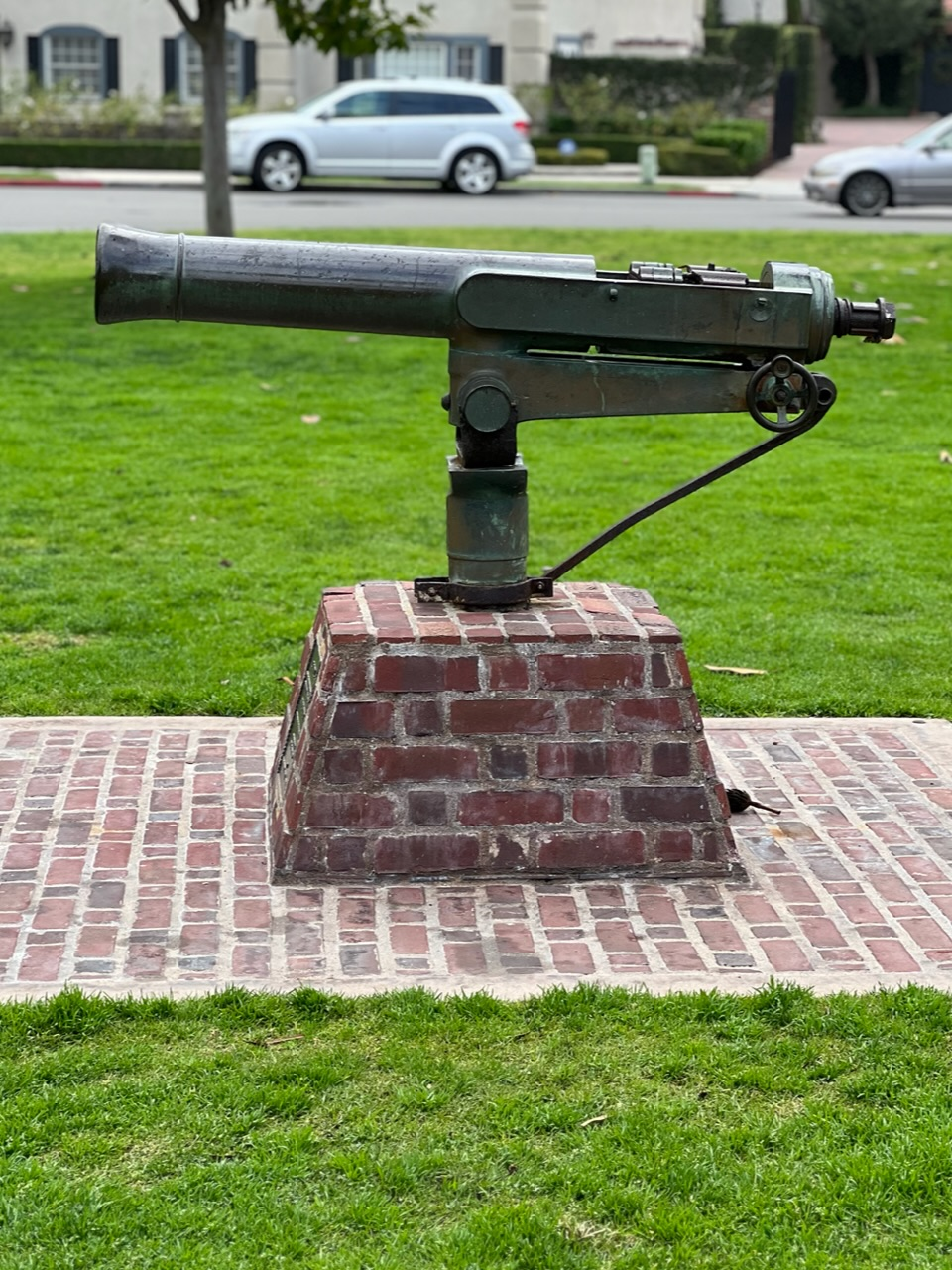
Belgian Mitrailleuse, c. 1850, on display in Coronado Star Park, Coronado, California

== See also ==
- Gardner gun
- Nordenfelt gun
- Ripley machine gun
