= Toussaint-Henry-Joseph Fafchamps =

Belgian inventor and military officer (1783–1868)

- Born: 1783; Blegny, Belgium
- Died: 1868 (aged 84–85)
- Other name: Toussaint-Henry-Joseph Fafschamps
- Military career
- Allegiance: Belgium
- Branch: Belgian Army
- Rank: Captain
- Known for: Developing the carabine multiple (precursor to the mitrailleuse)

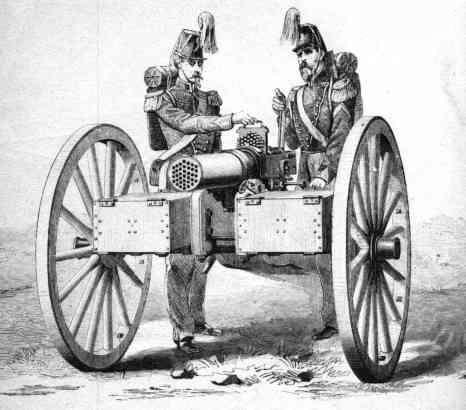
The 37-barrel Montigny mitrailleuse, completed in 1863, was derived from the invention of Fafschamps.

Toussaint-Henry-Joseph Fafchamps (French pronunciation: [tusɛ̃ ɑ̃ʁi ʒozɛf fafʃɑ̃]; 1783–1868), sometimes spelled Fafschamps, was a Belgian Army captain from Blegny, near Liège. In 1851, with the Belgian gunsmith Joseph Montigny and the Fusnot company, he developed what is sometimes considered the first machine gun in history, 10 years before the advent of the Gatling gun.

== Specifications ==
Fafchamps made a prototype of his machine, as well as drawings, which were remitted to Montigny. The Fafschamps gun was a manually fired 50-barrels volley gun using needle fire and paper cartridges, and was only intended as a stationary artillery piece for defensive fortifications. Fafchamps named it the "carabine multiple".

== Legacy ==
Joseph Montigny further improved the weapon, completing the transportable 37-barrels Montigny mitrailleuse (also known as the "Fafschamps-Montigny mitrailleuse") in 1863. From 1859, Joseph Montigny proposed his design to Napoleon III, which led to the development of the French Reffye mitrailleuse, designed by Jean-Baptiste Verchère de Reffye with the collaboration of Montigny, and which was adopted by the French Army in 1865. The invention of Fafschamps thus became the basis of the "mitrailleuse", which was used by the French in the Franco-Prussian War of 1870. Initially kept under wraps as a secret weapon, it became widely used in battle by French artillery during the Franco-Prussian War (1870–71).

== See also ==
- Gatling gun
- Montigny mitrailleuse
