= Michael the Brave 30th Guards Brigade =

Romanian infantry unit

- Brigada 30 Gardă "Mihai Viteazul"
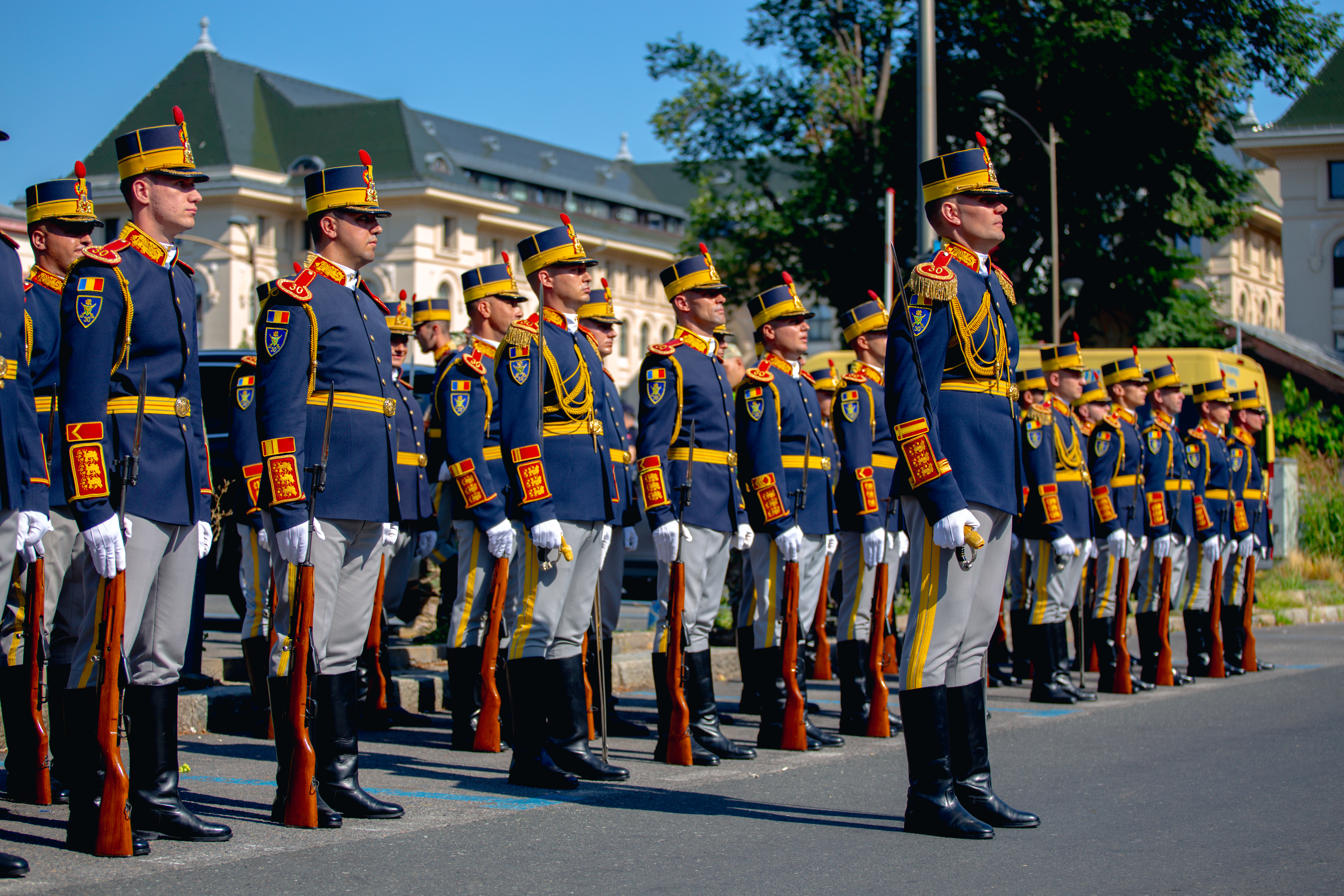
- Honor guards during the Roma Holocaust Memorial Day in 2026.
- Active: 1 July 1860–1948 (1st Vânători Battalion); 23 February 1990–present (current form)
- Country: Romania
- Branch: Romanian Armed Forces
- Type: Brigade
- Role: Honour Guard; Security
- Headquarters: Paul Theodorescu Boulevard, Bucharest, Romania
- Patron: Mihai Viteazul

Commanders
- Current commander: Colonel Cornel Văduva
- Notable commanders: Lieutenant Colonel Dorel Bejan

Insignia
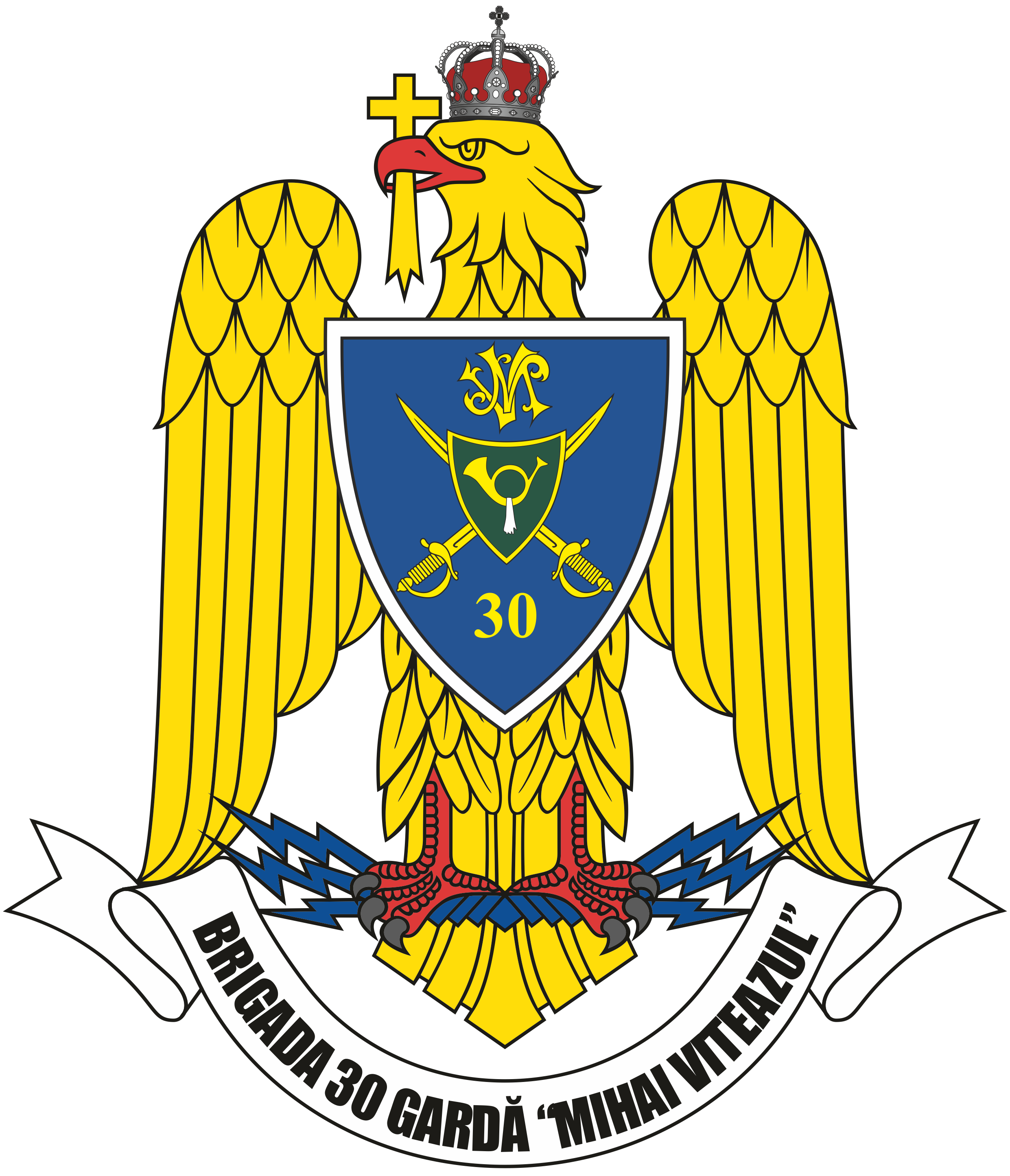
- Coat of Arms

The Michael the Brave 30th Guards Brigade (Romanian: Brigada 30 Gardă "Mihai Viteazul") is a primarily ceremonial, as well as combat unit of the Romanian Armed Forces established in 1990. The Brigade also has a military music band, a drill team detachment, and an artillery battery. The military police unit of the Brigade guards certain special objectives of Bucharest. The Brigade traces its origins to the 1st Tirailleur Battalion, later Vânători Battalion, which was established in 1860.

== History ==
=== Origins ===
On 1 July 1860, Batalionul 1 Tiraliori (1st Tirailleur Battalion) was established through a decree issued by Prince Alexandru Ioan Cuza. Besides the regular infantry duties, the battalion ensured the security of royal palaces and the headquarters of the Ministry of War. Soon after, on 31 August, it was renamed to Batalionul 1 de Vânători (1st Vânători Battalion) and was reassigned to the Ministry of War.

On 19 June 1930, King Carol II reformed the 6th Dorobanți Regiment "Michael the Brave" (Regimentul 6 Dorobanți "Mihai Viteazul") into the Michael the Brave Guard Regiment. The 6th Dorobanți Regiment was formed on 1 July 1873, and it participated in both the War of Independence, and in World War I. In 1891, it received the honorific name "Mihai Viteazul" (Michael the Brave). In 1940, the name was changed to the 6th Guard Dorobanți Regiment "Michael the Brave" and it participated in the campaigns of World War II.

On 20 June 1930, the Royal Palace Guard Battalion (Batalionul de Gardă al Palatului Regal) was established through an order of the General Staff. The battalion was formed by a detachment from a company from the Foot Gendarme Regiment. On 1 September, the unit became the Palace Guard Company, and in 1935, the Palace Guard Battalion. On 15 August 1941, it was further renamed to the Royal Guard Battalion.

=== 1948–1989 ===
The 1st Vânători Battalion was abolished by the communist government in 1948 after the abdication of King Michael I. The 6th Guard Dorobanți Regiment was transformed into the 6th Infantry Regiment in 1949, then into the 148th Infantry Regiment in 1950.

The Royal Guard Battalion was transformed into the Republican Guard Regiment on 15 March 1948. It was meant to ensure the security in places like Calea Victoriei, Șoseaua Kiseleff and the Băneasa Airport. The unit also provided protection for officials from the Ministry of National Defense. On February 28, 1964, by order of the General Staff, the 30th Guards Regiment was established with guard and protocol duties within the Romanian People's Army for President Nicolae Ceaușescu. In 1970, a new guard uniform was established, consisting of a navy blue suit, white shirt, black tie, boots and white harness belt, a uniform that marked the return to the Romanian tradition of the ceremonial uniform. On 21 October 1974, the Battle Flag of the 30th Guard Regiment was decorated with the Order of Tudor Vladimirescu, third class.

=== 1989–Present ===
The General Staff of the Armed Forces renamed the 30th Guards Regiment to the 30th Guards Brigade on 23 February 1990 following the Romanian Revolution. In 1995, the unit received the honorific name "Mihai Viteazul" (Michael the Brave) in an attempt to restore the old guard unit traditions of the Romanian Army. On 25 July 2001, it became a regiment again, being named the 30th Guards and Protocol Regiment Michael the Brave, then was renamed to the Michael the Brave 30th Guards Regiment in 2006. The unit was awarded with the National Order of Faithful Service in 2015 on the occasion of the brigade's 155th anniversary.

In 2018, it became a brigade once more, being subordinated to the General Staff of the Romanian Armed Forces.

== Units ==
=== Honor Guard Company ===
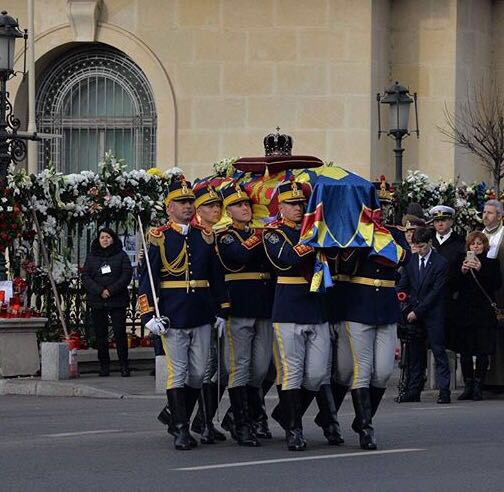
Honour Guard pallbearers carry the coffin of King Michael I of Romania in December 2017.

The primary mission of the brigade is to perform the required military honours for the President of Romania, Minister of Defence and foreign leaders. It also takes part in events such as the inauguration of a president, military parades, state funerals and military tattoos, as well as the Guard Mounting ceremony at the Mormântul Soldatului Necunoscut in Bucharest. Ceremonies for state visits usually involve more than 100 soldiers of the brigade and the band.

The company has taken part in ceremonies in Romania, and has represented the country in the 2007 and 2026 Bastille Day military parade in France, and the 2016 Chișinău Independence Day Parade in Moldova.

=== Brigade Fanfare ===
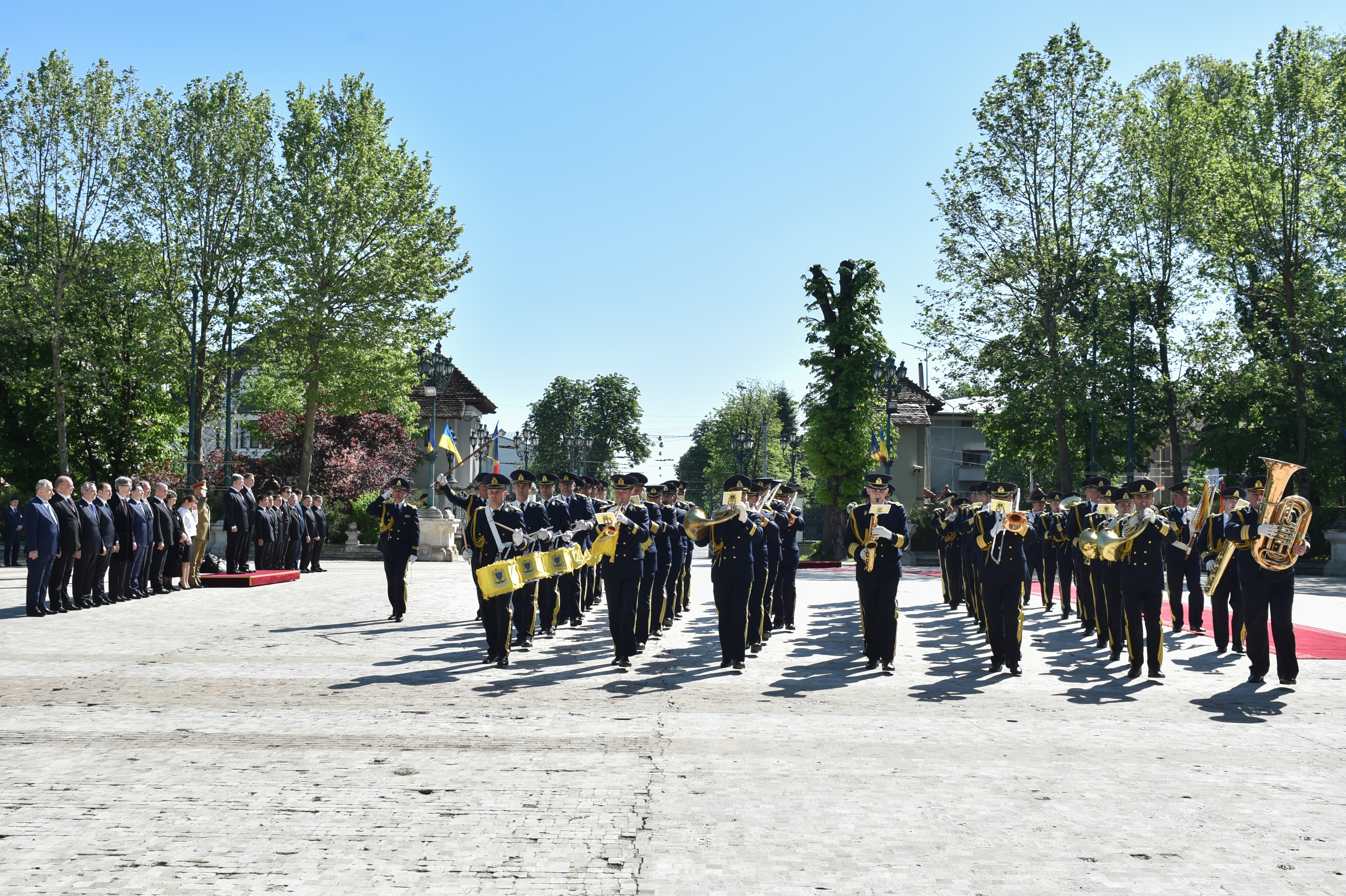
The fanfare of the brigade during Petro Poroshenko's visit to Romania.

The Fanfare band of the Brigade (Fanfara Brigăzii) provides musical support to the ceremonial activities of the honor guard.

=== Drill Team Detachment ===
The Brigade also has a Drill team detachment. The detachment has participated in many events in the country and abroad, in Europe and America. In 2019, the drill team also participated in the Virginia International Tattoo.

=== Salvo Battery ===
The Salvo Battery (Bateria salve) of the Brigade provides the gun salutes during various events, such as the Great Union Day or the Navy Day. It is equipped with 76 mm Model 1942 guns.

=== Military Police Unit ===
The brigade maintains a military police unit that engages targeting threats to the Bucharest Garrison as well as acts as security and military police in the city. During the Romanian Revolution in December 1989, 15 soldiers from the brigade's special purpose unit were killed while in duty.

== Church ==
The Military Church "Saint Great Martyr Mina" in Bucharest is a place of worship that belongs to the brigade.

== Decorations ==
The 30th Guard Brigade received the following decorations:

- Order of the Star of Romania, Peacetime (Knight – 2000; Officer – 2010)
- National Order of Faithful Service, Peacetime (Knight – 2015)
- Order of Military Virtue, Peacetime (Officer – 2015; Commander – 2020; Grand Officer – 2023)

== Gallery ==
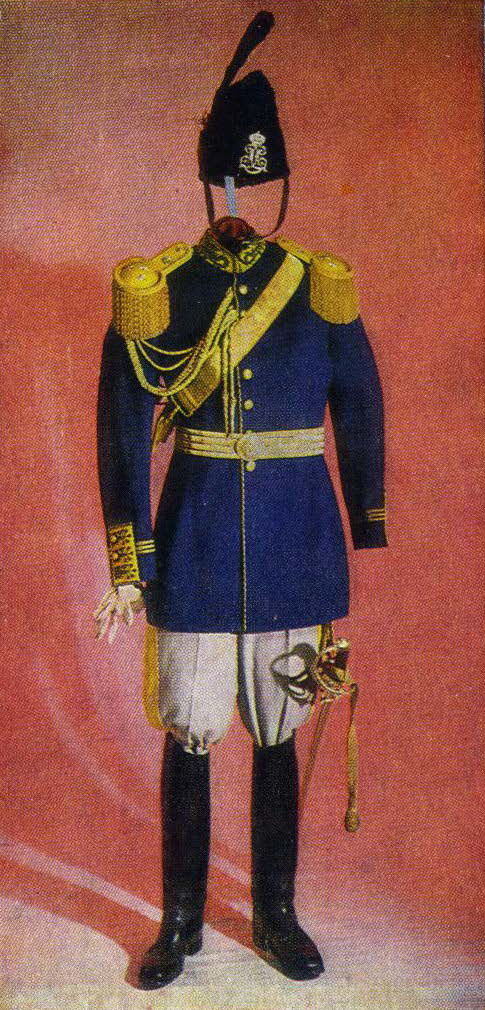
Ceremonial uniform of the Michael the Brave Guard Regiment in 1930

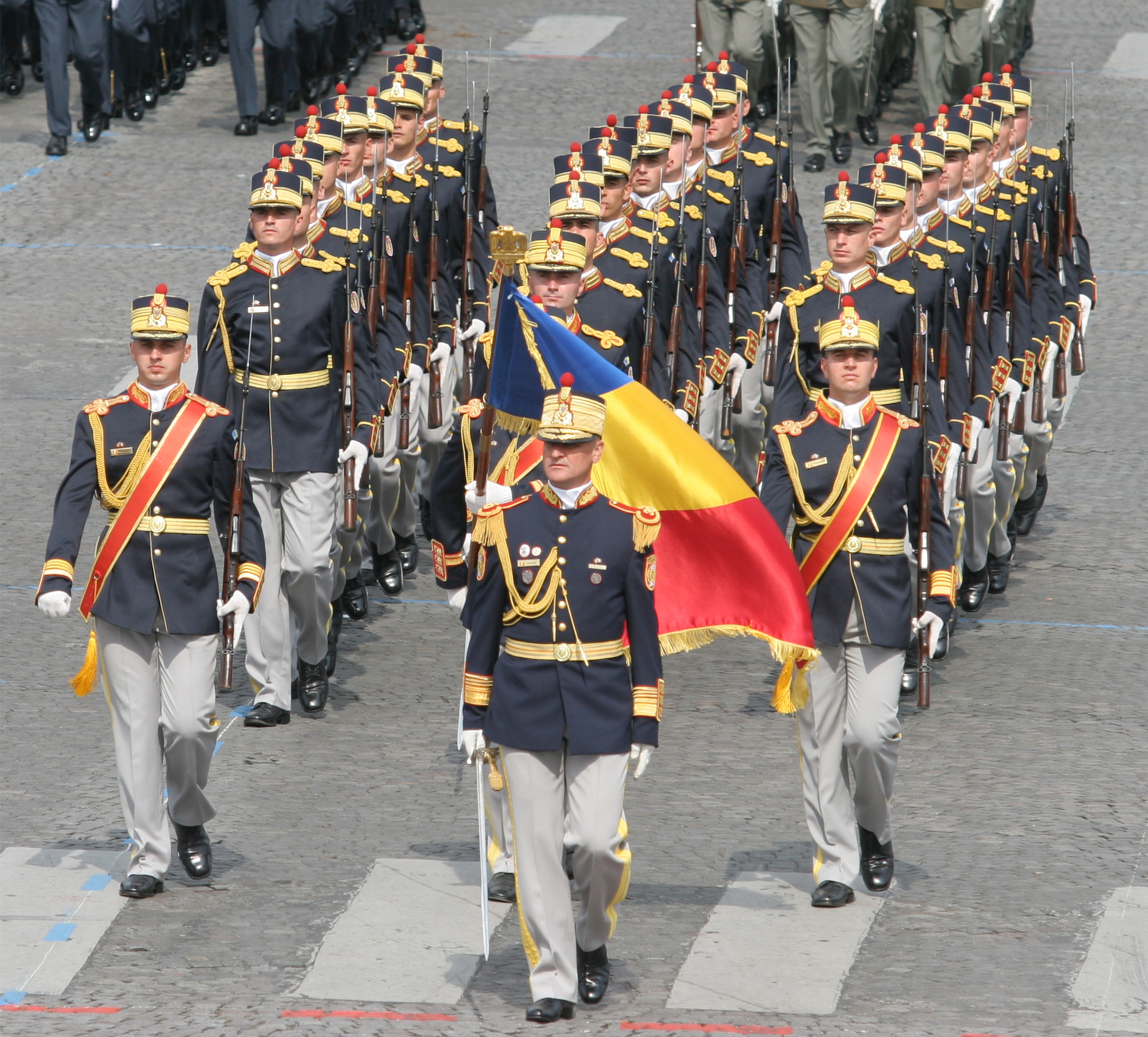
Soldiers during the 2007 Bastille Day Parade

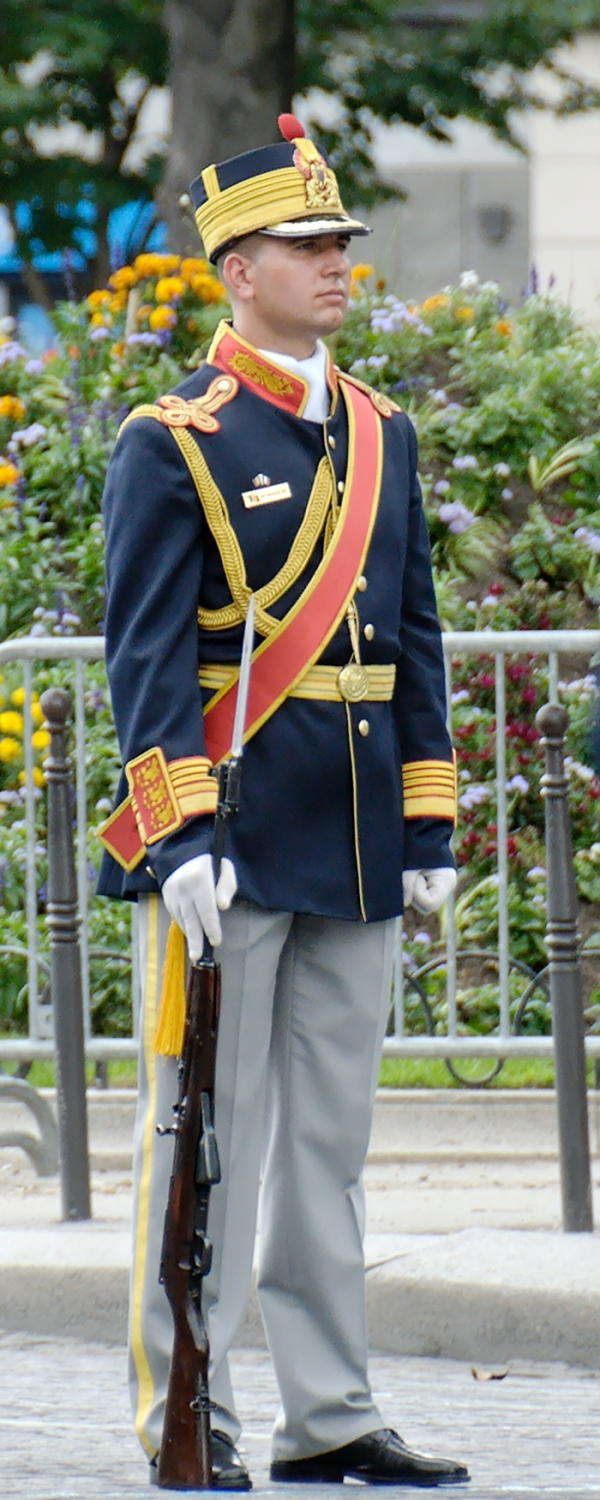
A soldier of the Honor Guard in 2007

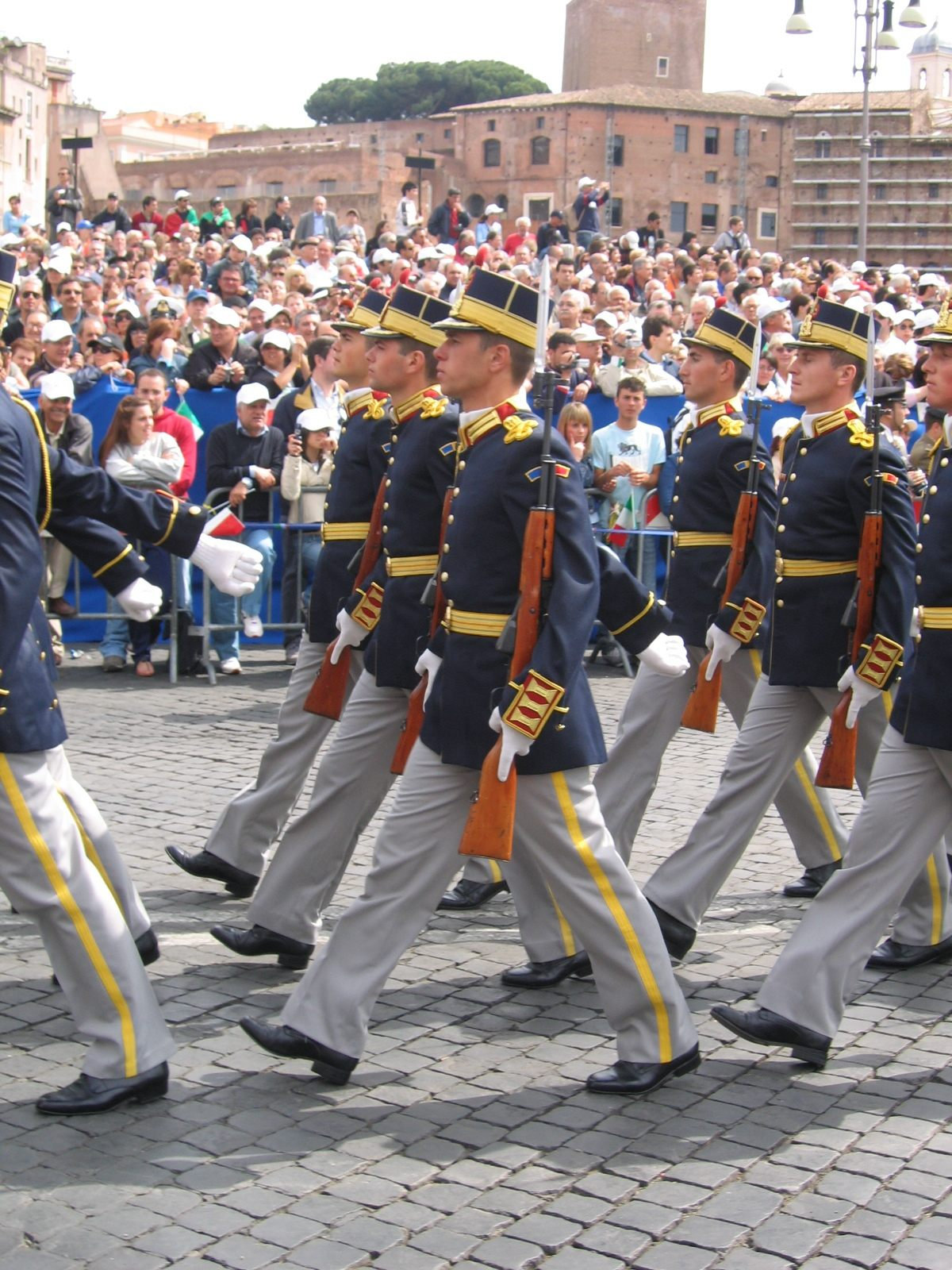
Guards marching during a parade in Rome in 2006

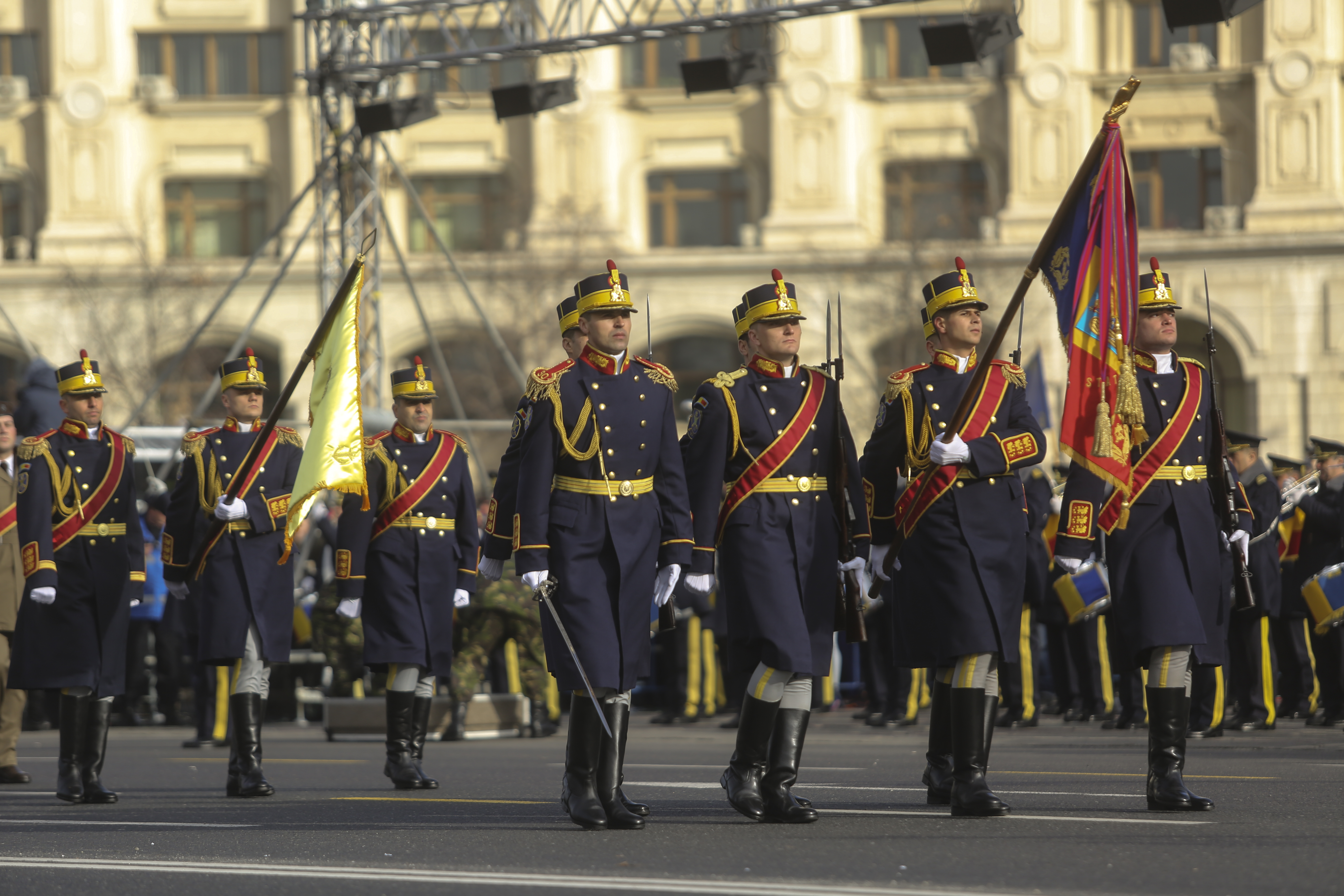
Flag Guard of the 30th Guards Brigade in 2015

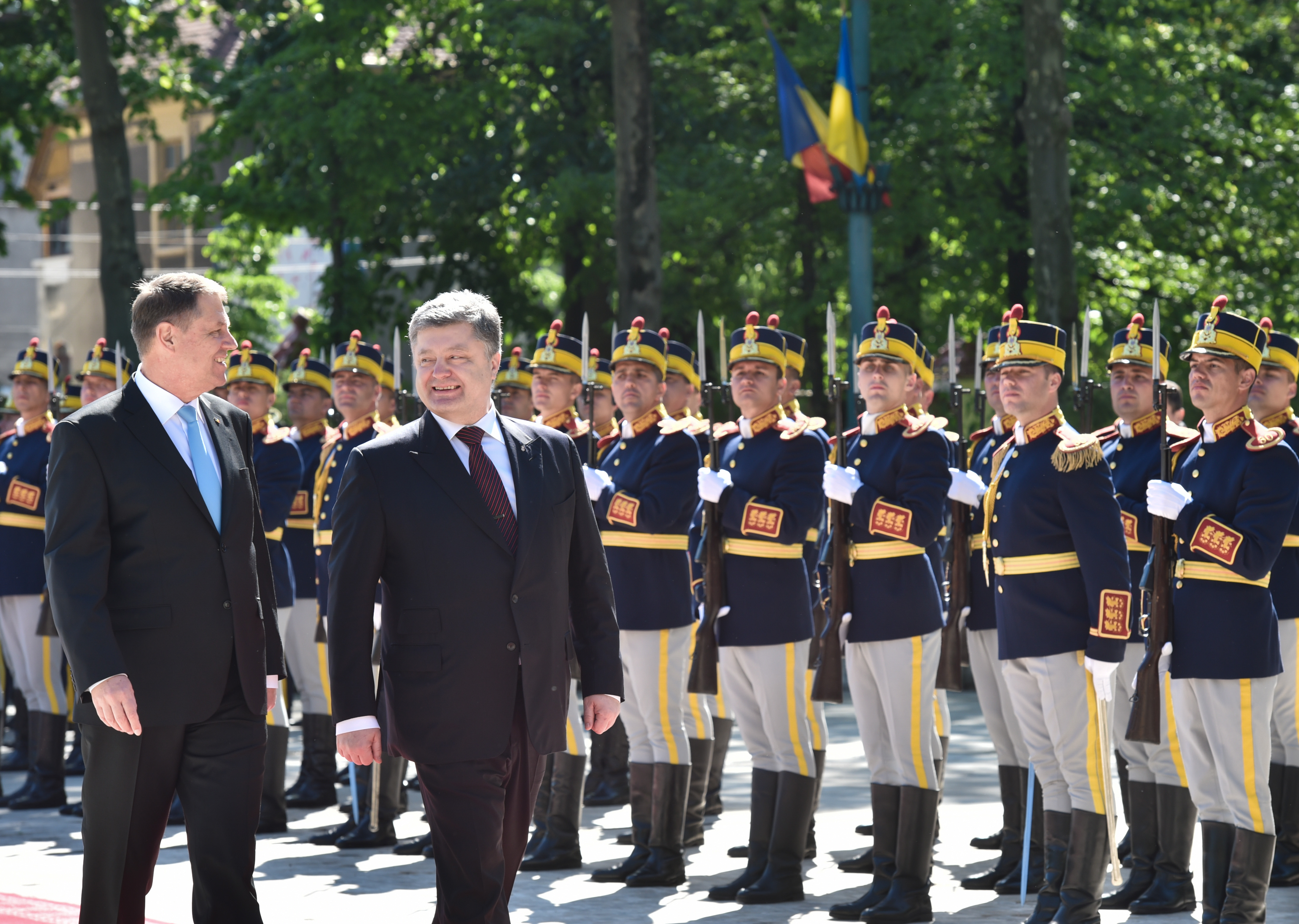
Petro Poroshenko inspecting the unit.

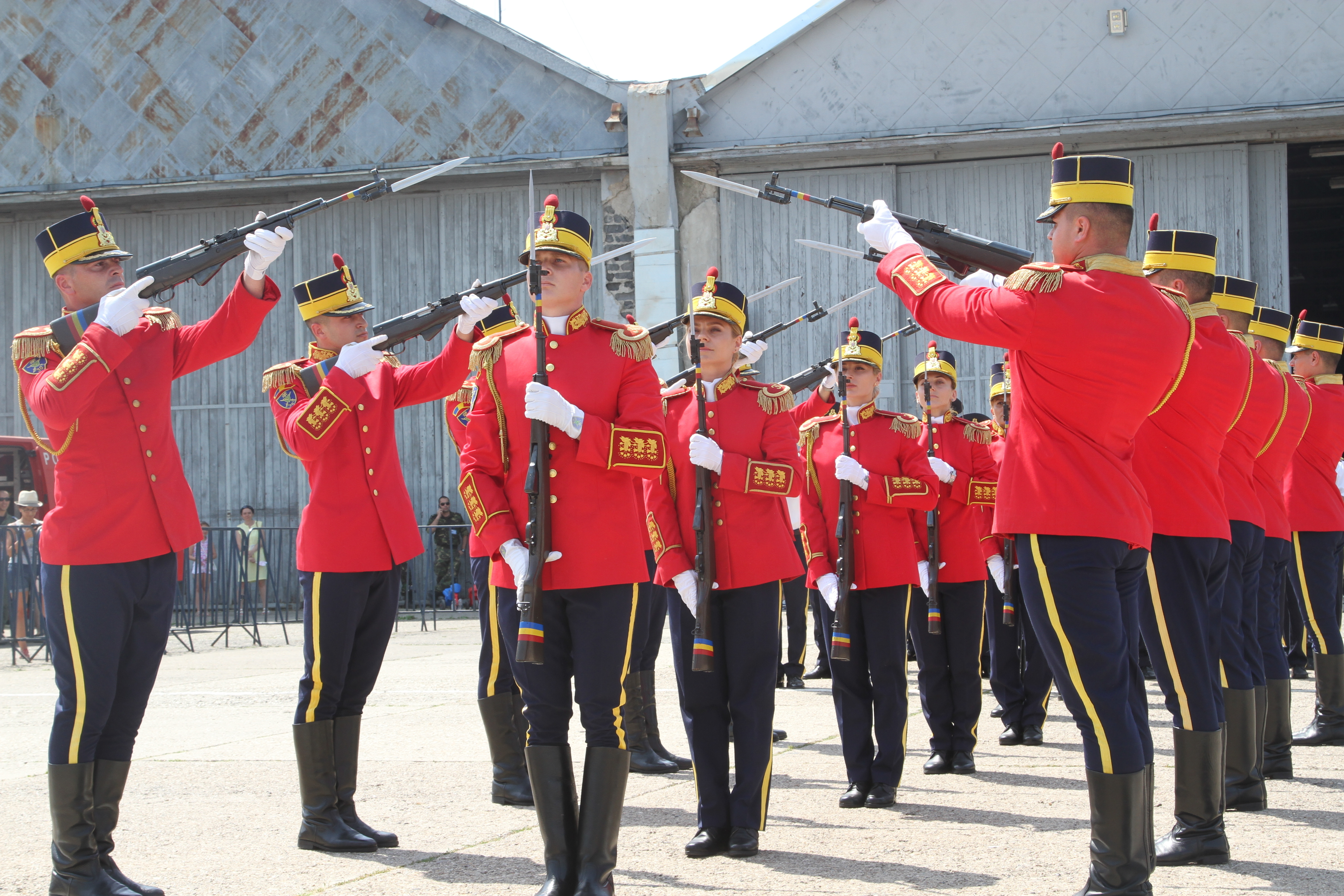
Drill team of the brigade in 2017

== See also ==
- Guard of honour
- Honor Guard Company (Moldova)
- 2nd Guard Aviation Flotilla
- Great Union Day
- Structure of the Romanian Land Forces
- Romanian Special Operations Forces Command

== Bibliography ==
- Spânu, Alin (2020). "Evoluția Regimentului de Gardă "Mihai Viteazul" văzută de unul dintre comandanți, Generalul Ștefan Opriș" (PDF). Revista Misiunea (in Romanian). No. 1/2020.
