= Montigny mitrailleuse =

Mitrailleuse Montigny
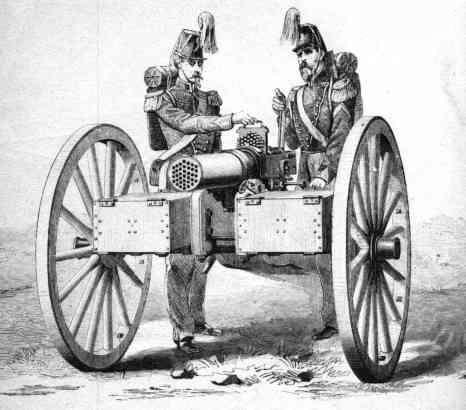
- Montigny mitrailleuse.
- Type: Regimental artillery field gun
- Place of origin: Belgium

Service history
- In service: 1863
- Used by: Austria Hungary, Belgium, China, German New Guinea Romania
- Wars: Romanian War of Independence; World War I (limited)

Production history
- Designer: Joseph Montigny
- Produced: 1863

Specifications
- Shell: bullets
- Caliber: 11 mm
- Barrels: 37

The Montigny mitrailleuse was an early type of crank-operated machine-gun developed by the Belgian gun works of Joseph Montigny between 1859 and 1870. It was an improved version of the "Mitrailleuse", (English: Grapeshot shooter) invented by Belgian Captain Fafschamps in 1851 which was a fixed 50-barrelled volley gun.

The Montigny mitrailleuse was designed to defend narrow defensive positions such as the moats of fortresses. The Belgian army initially purchased Fafschamps volley guns. Only later did they acquire Montigny mitrailleuses.

Joseph Montigny also promoted and sold the weapon for offensive field use by placing the weapon on an artillery carriage.

== Specifications ==
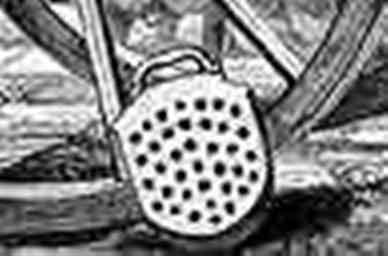
Magazine plate of a Montigny mitrailleuse, designed to hold 37 cartridges and to be slid into the breech before firing.

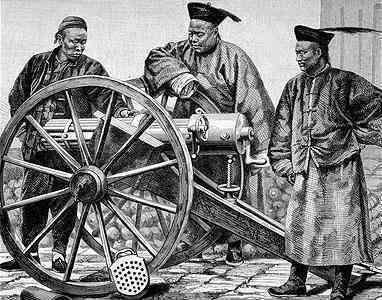
Chinese Qing Empire officers with Montigny mitrailleuse.

The weapon consisted of 37 barrels of 11 mm inside a cylindrical protective casing. Loading was performed with a loading plate containing 37 cartridges. It was inserted against the breech in one stroke and locked in with a hinged loading lever attached to the rear of the gun. The ammunition had a brass head and thin rolled brass foil body and was fired by needle pins. With the rotation of a crank, all shots were fired simultaneously, although later improvements used a cam which permitted the progressive firing of the 37 shots. Around 150–250 shots per minute could be fired depending on the skills of the operators. The whole weapon was very heavy, weighing 2,000 pounds (910 kg).

The Montigny Mitrailleuse was built in numbers and used mostly to defend Belgian forts and other defensive positions.

== Development of the Reffye mitrailleuse ==
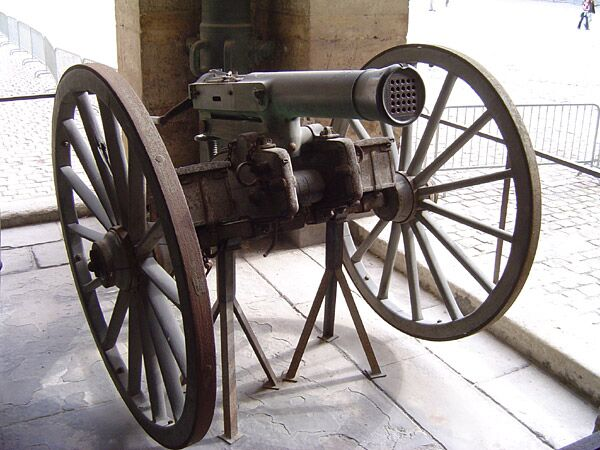
The 25-barrels Reffye mitrailleuse ("Canon à balles modèle 1866") was adapted from the 37 barrels Montigny mitrailleuse.

Napoleon III showed personal interest in the mitrailleuse. Montigny had approached the French army for the purpose of a sale. Experiments to evaluate the weapon began in 1863 in a French facility near Paris but the decision was made to build a similar weapon by sole French means. Manufacture began at Meudon in 1866 under the direction of Verchères de Reffye and the undisclosed assistance of Montigny. Hence the weapon is usually known as the "Reffye mitrailleuse". Altogether 215 mitrailleuses were manufactured for the French Army before the Franco-Prussian War of 1870–71. They were of the 13mm, 25-barrels type, and used elongated shotgun shell style cartridges instead of foil cartridges as in the Montigny mitrailleuse. The weapon, which was on an artillery carriage, was deployed in six gun batteries and manned by artillery personnel. Most of the time, they were used quite ineffectively to engage distant targets. When the weapon was engaged at the Battle of Gravelotte in 1870, in an infantry support role and at shorter distances, it produced devastating effects.

== See also ==
- Gatling gun
- Mitrailleuse
