= Joseph Montigny =

- Occupation: Gunsmith
- Known for: Development of the Montigny mitrailleuse

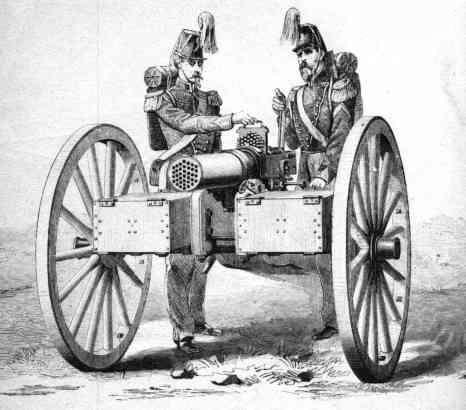
The 37-barrels Montigny mitrailleuse, developed in 1863 by Joseph Montigny

Joseph Montigny was a Belgian gunsmith, from Fontaine l'Evèque, and the developer of the Montigny mitrailleuse, an early European machine gun, in 1863. The design was based on the early 1850s prototype of a volley gun by the Belgian officer Fafschamps. Montigny managed to offer his design to Napoléon III, who adopted it in 1867, with Colonel De Reffye making various improvements to the weapons.

Joseph Montigny also developed various rifles and shotguns with breech loading mechanisms based on the designs of the Swiss inventor Jean Samuel Pauly.
