= Giuseppe Marco Fieschi =

Corsican mass murderer (1790–1836)

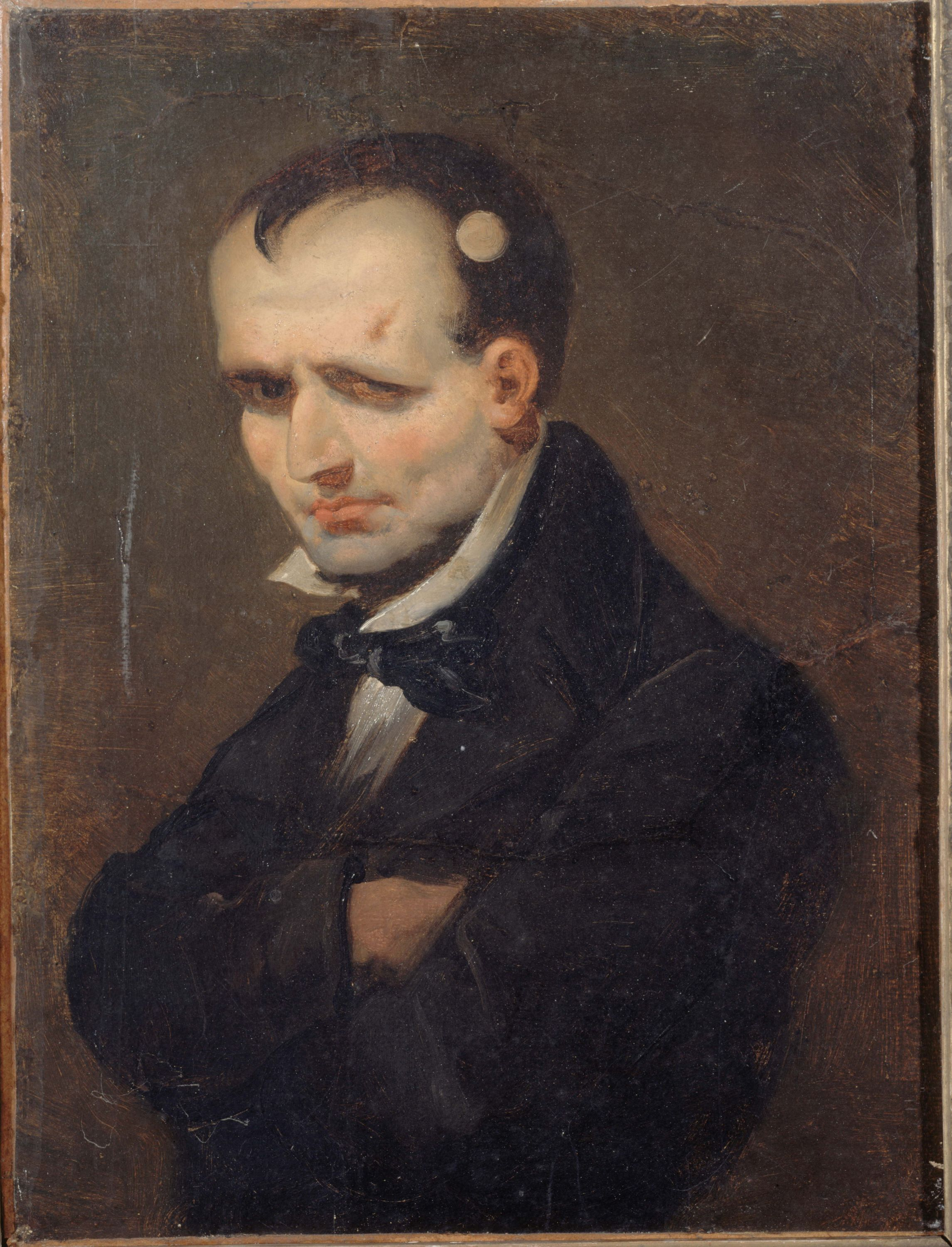
- Portrait of Fieschi at his trial
- Born: 13 December 1790; Bocognano, Corsica, France
- Died: 19 February 1836 (aged 45); Paris, France
- Cause of death: Execution by guillotine
- Known for: Attempted the assassination of King Louis Philippe I of France
- Parent(s): Louis Fieschi and Marie Lucie Fieschi
- Status: Executed
- Conviction: Murder
- Penalty: Death

Details
- Date: 28 July 1835
- Country: France
- Killed: 18
- Injured: 22
- Military career
- Allegiance: France
- Branch: French Imperial Army
- Service years: 1808-1814
- Rank: Sergeant
- Conflicts: Napoleonic Wars

Giuseppe Marco Fieschi (13 December 1790 – 19 February 1836) was a Corsican soldier, mechanic and mass murderer, who was the chief conspirator in an attempted assassination of King Louis Philippe I of France on 28 July 1835. The attack on the King and his entourage, which made use of a unique volley gun known as the "infernal machine," killed 18 people, but the King only received a minor wound and Fieschi was quickly captured. He and two other conspirators were subsequently tried and executed.

== Biography ==
Fieschi was born on 13 December 1790 in Bocognano, a commune on the island of Corsica. His parents were Louis and Marie Lucie, of Pomonti. He had two brothers, Thomas and Anthony. Thomas was killed in the Battle of Wagram. Anthony was mute from birth. Giuseppe spent his childhood and adolescence as a shepherd. In 1808 he joined a Corsican regiment and was sent to Naples, then to Russia to fight in the Napoleonic Wars. In 1812 he held the rank of sergeant. He was discharged from the army in 1814 and returned to Corsica. In September 1815, he was one of around 1000 followers who joined former King of Naples Joachim Murat in an attempt to regain his kingdom, this ended a month later with Murat's capture and execution by forces of Ferdinand IV of Naples. (Note: Bouveroin suggests Fieschi played a treacherous role in this.) According to Harsin, Fieschi escaped execution and was deported to France, where he was eventually sentenced in 1816 to 10 years in jail for the theft of a steer. There he met a female inmate, Laurence Petit. Upon his release in 1826 he moved to Lyon, Petit's hometown.

Shortly after the July Revolution, Fieschi moved to Paris, calling himself a political prisoner, a deceit that allowed for unchallenged movement. There, he maintained a lifelong affair with his stepdaughter Nina, which led to the break-up of his relationship with her mother, Laurence. He obtained a small post in Paris by means of forged papers, but eventually lost his job and pensions that he had fraudulently obtained from the government.

=== Attempted assassination of Louis Philippe I ===
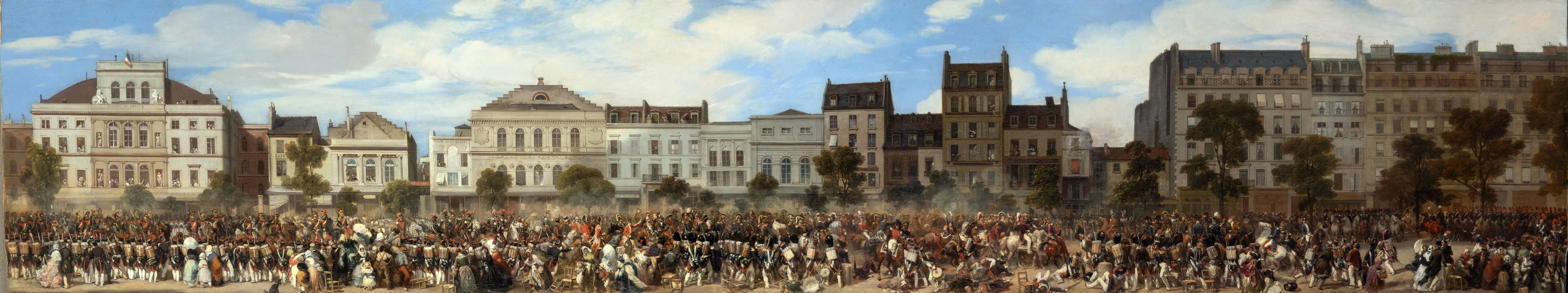
Attempted assassination of Louis Philippe by Giseppe Fieschi (Eugène Lami, Château de Versailles)

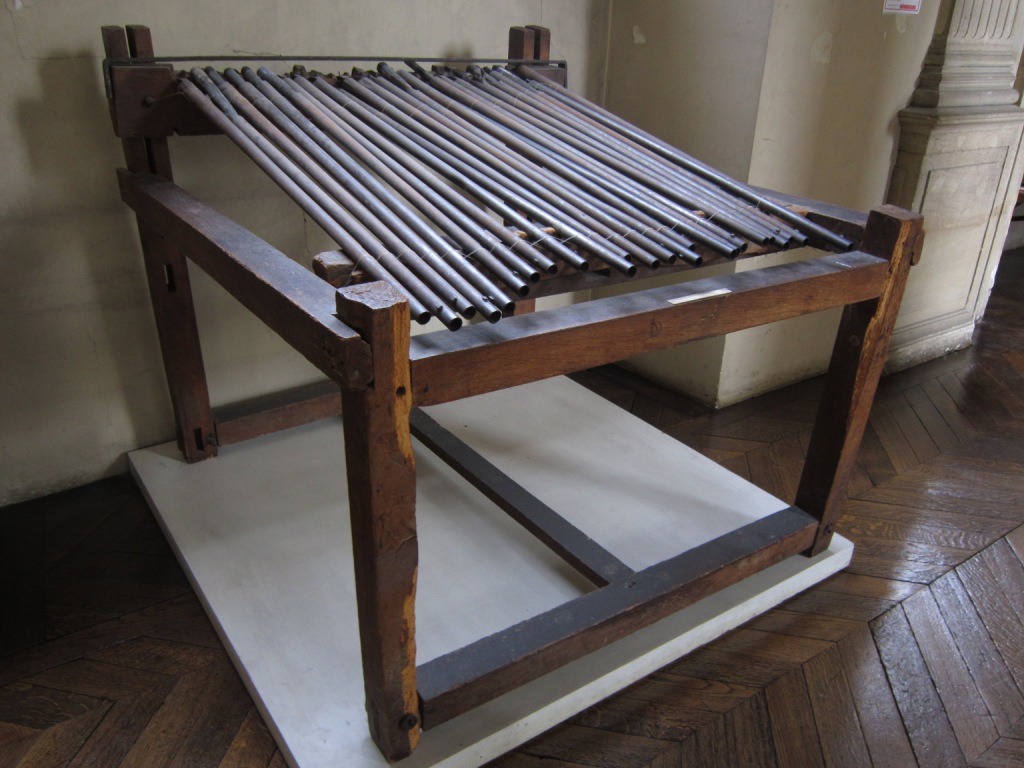
The Infernal machine on display at the Musée des Archives Nationales, 2012

In 1831, Fieschi met his later-to-be co-conspirator Pierre Morey, a neighbour. Morey was a 61-year-old saddler who had been involved in Republican politics. He had been arrested but released in 1816 after falling under suspicion of plotting the assassination of the Bourbons. He was later tried and acquitted of the murder of an Austrian soldier. In 1830, he took part in the July Revolution that put King Louis-Phillipe in power.

The two contrived the plan for an "infernal machine", a volley gun with 25 gun-barrels which could be fired simultaneously. Morey took the plan to Théodore Pépin, chief of the Society of the Rights of Man Section Rome. After a meeting, they decided to build the weapon, splitting the cost of 500 francs between Pépin and Morey, with the penniless Fieschi building it and being paid for it. The gun was built in the place it was intended to be used – a four-room apartment on the third floor of No. 50 Boulevard du Temple. This was on the expected route the King and his entourage would take during the annual review of the Paris National Guard.

The annual review, which commemorated the 1830 July revolution, took place on 28 July 1835. Louis-Philippe was passing along the Boulevard du Temple, which connected Place de la République to the Bastille. He was accompanied by three of his sons, the Duke of Orleans, the Duke of Nemours, and the Prince de Joinville, and a large number of staff and senior officers.

Fieschi was waiting for them, 24 barrels of his gun were each loaded with eight round balls and additional slugs. When the royal party passed in the street below, he fired the gun. Not all the barrels fired, but the gun still produced a volley of around 400 projectiles. Eighteen people were killed at the scene, or later died from their wounds, including Lieutenant Colonel Rieussec together with eight other officers of the 8th Legion, Marshal Mortier, and Colonel Raffet, General Girard, Captain Villate, General La Chasse de Vérigny and Alexandre Labrouste, father of notable architect Henri Labrouste.

A further 22 people were injured, with at least four requiring limbs to be amputated. The King was one of the injured, but the wound was minor – a bullet or buckshot only grazed his forehead, although the horse he was riding was severely wounded, and died several days later. The King continued with the day's events and reviewed the National Guard as planned. Many of the dead and injured were carried into the Jardin Turc, a famous café that was situated nearby.

Four of the gun's 25 barrels burst when fired, four others did not fire, and a further one was not loaded as it lacked a touch hole. This meant the number of deaths and injuries was lower than might have been the case had all components functioned. The gun barrels that exploded caused considerable damage to the room in which the weapon was fired. Fieschi received severe head, facial and hand wounds and he was quickly captured. Two of his fingers later had to be amputated.

=== Trial and execution ===
After his capture, Fieschi gave a false name, claiming to be Jacques Girard, born in Lodève. It was only after some days that his true identity was discovered when he was recognized by the Inspector General of Prisons, Olivier Dufresne, while he was being held in the Conciergerie.

Fieschi's trial became a great spectacle and Fieschi enjoyed his stardom. During the trial, he named his accomplices, displayed much bravado, and expected or pretended to expect ultimate pardon. He was represented by the Corsican lawyer François-Marie Patorni, and Parisian lawyers Gustave Louis Chaix d'Est-Ange and Jean-Baptiste-Nicolas Parquin. He was condemned to death, and was guillotined on 19 February 1836 together with Pierre Morey and Théodore Pépin. Pépin died first, then Morey. Fieschi was the last, and used his last moments for a speech. Fieschi's head was given to a doctor at Bicêtre Hospital for study purposes.

Before his death, Pépin made several confessions about revolutionary groups which led to subsequent arrests and trials. Another accomplice was sentenced to twenty years' imprisonment and one was acquitted. No fewer than seven plots against the life of Louis Philippe had been discovered by the police within the year, and apologists were not wanting in the revolutionary press for the crime of Fieschi.

== Legacy ==
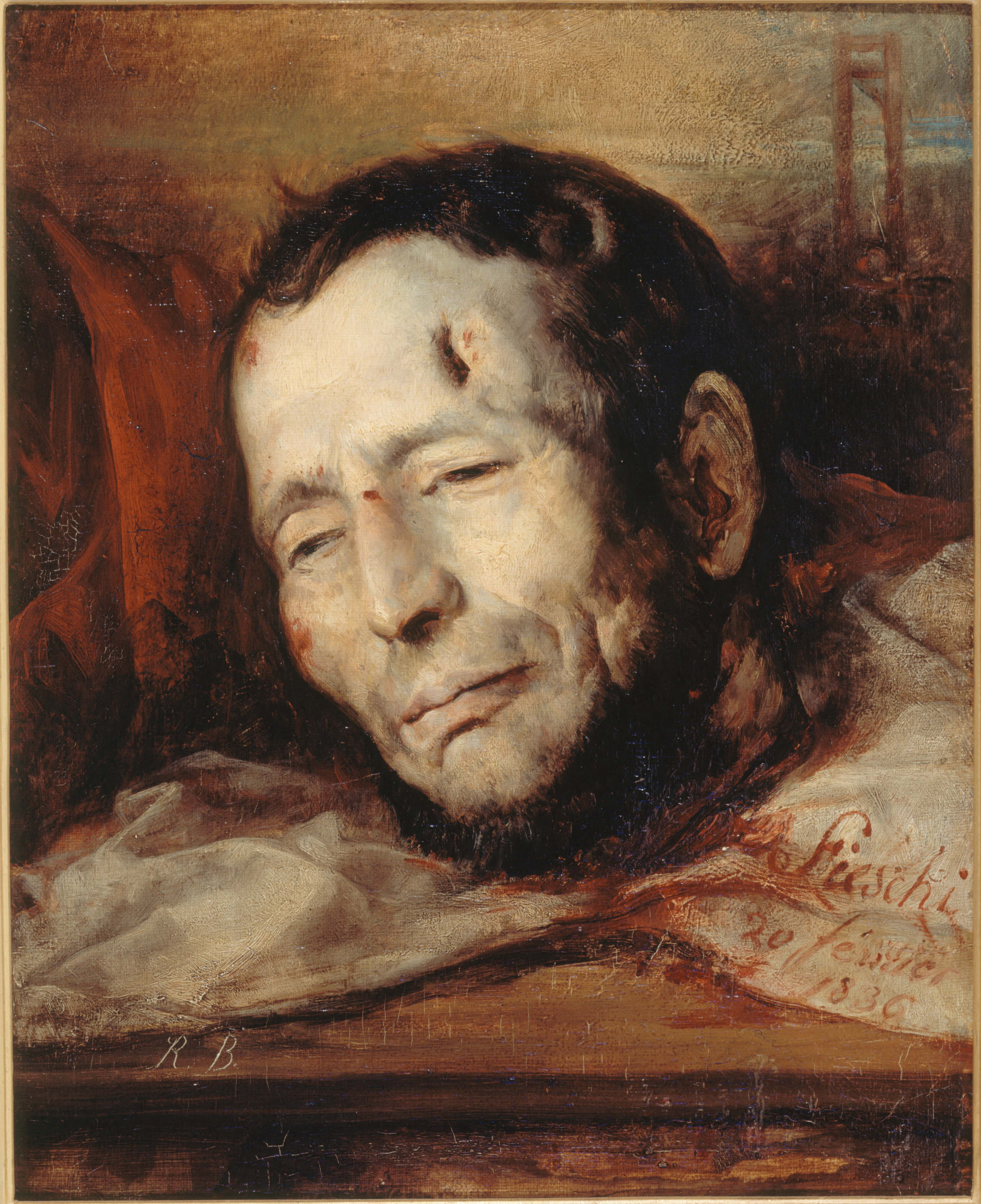
The head of Fieschi after his execution

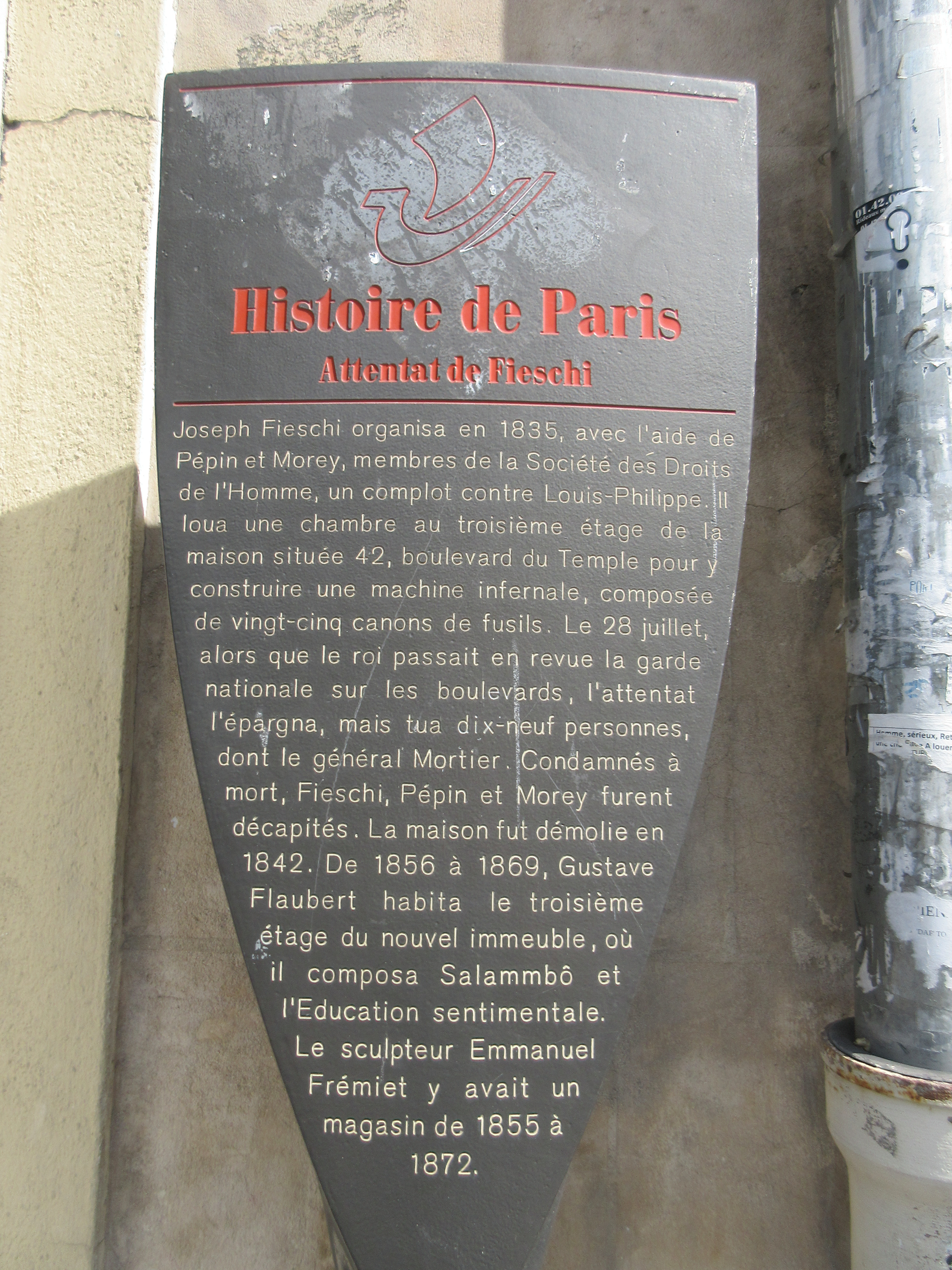
The plaque commemorating Fieschi near where the assassination attempt took place

In the immediate aftermath of the attack, a number of newspaper editors and writers were arrested, including Armand Carrel, but they were soon released. Fourteen victims of Fieschi's attack were interred in the vaults of Les Invalides, which is usually the place of interment for French military leaders which the nation wishes to honor.

Horace Vernet, the King's painter, was ordered to make a drawing of the assassination attempt, which Eugene Louis Lami executed. Fieschi's head was painted by the French painter Jacques Raymond Brascassat the day after the execution. A death mask was also made to record Fieschi's facial features. A copy of this is preserved in England at Norwich Castle; the mask shows evidence of the facial and head injuries he received. Another copy was part of the collection of the Edinburgh Phrenological Society and is now in the possession of the University of Edinburgh. A postmortem examination of Fieschi's brain was carried out by the anatomists Louis Pierre Gratiolet and François Leuret, to determine if it exhibited features that might explain his behavior.

A plaque at n° 50 Boulevard du Temple commemorates the event. Giuseppe Fieschi was honored in a religious service at a Moscow church at the prompting of Soviet General Andrei Grigorevich Kostikov, the inventor of the Katyusha rocket launcher.

Fieschi's volley gun, which became known as the Machine infernale, is now part of the collection of the Musée des Archives Nationales in Paris.

== See also ==
- July Monarchy
