= Jean Prosper Guivier =

French musician

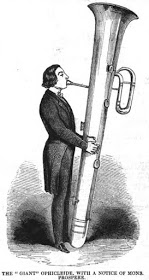
Jean Prosper Guivier

Jean Prosper Guivier (c. 12 March 1814 – 18 November 1862), also later known as Prospère, was a French musician, best known for his solo performances in the orchestra of Louis-Antoine Jullien. The son of a Napoleonic soldier, he was brought up in the army before enrolling at the Conservatoire de Paris, where he was expelled. As an early exponent of the ophicleide, Guivier became one of Jullien's core of elite musicians along with other soloists such as Herman Koenig. Ill health forced him to reduce his musical engagements during the 1850s and he supplemented his income by dealing and consulting on the design of brass instruments. He retired to Marseille in 1860, where he died.

== Early years ==
Jean Prosper Guivier was born in Antakalnis, a district in Vilnius, Lithuania, the son of Etienne Simon Guivier (1780–1829), a Napoleonic soldier of the 106^{e} régiment d'Infanterie de ligne (106th Line Infantry Regiment) and Hélène or Marie-Hélène Odino or Odinot (1786–1857). He was born in Vilnius shortly before his parents were released and returned to France after the disastrous Russian Campaign. The exact date of birth is not known; his birth certificate states that he was born on 28 February and christened on 30 February (Julian Calendar). His baptismal certificate states that he was born on 30 February and baptised on 1 March (Julian calendar), while later documents give his birth date as 1 March, 'the last day of February (old style)', or 19 March. Assuming his date of birth to be 28 February, this would give his date of birth as 12 March in the Gregorian calendar.

Jean Prosper had four brothers, Simon Antoine (born 1804), Napoléon Nicolas (1806–1827), Joseph (1816–1871) and Jean Baptiste (1818–1860) and grew up in the barracks of the 23^{e} légion du Doubs which was garrisoned on a rotational basis, generally moving each year. In 1820, the legion was combined with 2^{e} battalion, 61^{e} légion bis, Pas de Calais and renamed the 44^{e} régiment d'infanterie de ligne (in 1840 renamed the 44^{e} régiment d'infanterie).

Etienne's wife was a cantinière, officially engaged by the army as a seller of goods or as a launderess for his company and while no records of her employment have been found, the fact is known by their right to bring up their sons within the regiment. Each of the boys in turn became an enfant de troupe from the age of two years, receiving education, a wage, uniform and when old enough, apprenticeship to a trade which appears for each boy to have been musical training. At the age of 13, Jean Prosper was present at the Battle of Navarino on 20 October 1827 on board the Scipion. On 13 May 1828, he deserted the regiment and took a position, probably as a musician-gagiste, a civilian musician, in the suite of General Camille Alphonse Trezel, Assistant Chief of the General Staff who was returning to the Morea to oversee the withdrawal of Egyptian and Turkish troops and the handing over of Greece to its people. He was also required to work in the commissariat, a role which he found intensely tedious. By now, he had adopted the pseudonym Prospère, later claiming that this had been to distinguish himself from his four brothers whilst still in the army.

== In Paris ==
By 1832, Prospère had returned to France and enrolled as a student of the horn ("1er Cor") at the Conservatoire de Paris. However, he was expelled for non-attendance within three months as shown in the register, where it states "rayé, pour cause d'abs. le 1er janv. 1833".

A possible contributory factor in his decision to leave formal musical education may have been his interest in the ophicleide, a large, keyed, brass instrument, a precursor to the tuba, and which replaced the serpent in romantic orchestras. At this time, it was still a new instrument and was not yet taught at the Conservatoire.

It was while Prospère was in Paris that he became acquainted with the conductor and composer Louis Julien or Jullien (23 April 1812 – 14 March 1860). A former bandmaster in the French navy and then briefly a soldier in the 54^{e} régiment d'infanterie de ligne, he attended the Conservatoire after Jean Prosper from 26 October 1833 to 1 May 1836, but he too was expelled, apparently due to his preference for lighter forms of music. From 1836 to 1838 Jullien conducted the band of the Jardin Turc on the Boulevard du Temple, playing music from military marches and introducing many Parisians to the latest operatic music, simplified and played as quadrilles, largely emulating the concerts of Philippe Musard. By 1838, Prospère was playing the ophicleide in Jullien's concerts at the Jardin Turc.

Jean Prosper married Louise Barbary (25 March 1816 – 28 June 1900) in her home town of Avesnes-sur-Helpe, northern France on 5 March 1838. Returning to Paris, they lived at 3, Rue Capron, Batignolles Monceau in the Parisian arrondissement of Saint-Denis where their first child, Hyacinthe Palmire Hélène, was born on 30 December 1838. Their second daughter, Hélèna, was born c. 1840.

== In London ==
In the autumn of 1840, Prospère arrived in London for a season of Concerts d'Hiver at the Theatre Royal, Drury Lane, beginning on 8 October and conducted by Philippe Musard. Playbills advertising the forthcoming season state that this is Musard's first public appearance in England, and lists several musicians, including Prospère, who are making their English debut. Prospère's first advertised solo was given on 5 November, playing pieces from the opera Les Huguenots by Giacomo Meyerbeer. With Musard's return to Paris at the end of the season, Jullien established his residency in London, performing summer and winter seasons and extensive provincial tours throughout Great Britain almost continuously until 1859, except when he left for an extended tour of the US from February 1853 to May 1854, in which Prospère did not accompany him. Between Jullien's rigorous schedules, Prospère found work elsewhere, at promenade concerts and music festivals.

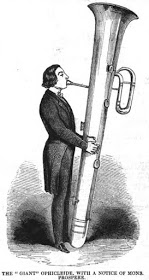
The French virtuoso Jean Prospère Guivier playing a gigantic ophicleide (London, 1843).

Jean Prosper and Louise's son Joseph Prosper was born at Louise's parents' home on Rue de Mons, Avesnes-sur-Helpe on 26 October 1842. Once Prospère had been established in London for about two years with regular work, he arranged for his wife and children to come to England as soon as was convenient. Tragically, shortly before the family could travel, three-year-old Hélèna died on 19 February 1843. Despite this, Prospère made appearances at the Birmingham Music Festival and the Hanover Square Rooms, performing on the colossal monstre, a contrabass ophicleide, and made himself available for an interview and portrait with the Illustrated London News. The Guivier family's first London address may have been 1 York Street, Strand, where Henriette Marie Louise was born on 24 July 1844.

Prospère's professional engagements included performing for Royalty, at five state balls at Buckingham Palace on 15 April 1842, 24 July 1843, 19 May 1845, 26 June 1850, and 13 June 1851 each of which were attended by around two thousand people.

Perhaps in an appeal to aficionados of more purely classical music, Prospère undertook engagements with some of London's leading orchestras including that of the Philharmonic Society between his regular seasons with Jullien as early as Spring 1846. Meanwhile, in the Summer of that year, he played for Jullien's Concerts d'Été, temporarily substituting his ophicleide for "his newly-invented instrument called the serpentcleide", an instrument closely related to the ophicleide, but made of wood.

Upon the reopening of the Royal Italian Opera in April 1847, Prospère joined the resident orchestra, while continuing to play for Jullien's orchestra in the seasons of Concerts d'Été and d'Hiver. On 4 February 1849, Prospère joined the Royal Society of Musicians in London. By this time, Jean Prosper and his family had moved house to 26 Brydges Street, Covent Garden. His successful application was fortunate, as medical complications forced Prospère to approach the RSM nine years later for financial relief.

Prospère occasionally appeared publicly with his daughter Hyacinthe Hélène, who accompanied him on the piano. So well known was Prospère's name and reputation that he was occasionally referred to in metaphor. A newspaper journalist's analysis of a lacklustre cricket match between St John's, Westminster and Kingston, is disparaging of the last-minute rearranging of the fielders. They should evidently have been kept to allotted positions in accordance with their individual strengths. He argues by way of comparison "A Prospere, great as he is on the ophicleide, would cut a sorry figure at first fiddle." On Jullien's return to England from America, preparations were made for a month of promenade concerts at the Theatre Royal, Drury Lane beginning in October 1854. This was Prospère's final season with Jullien and the following year he undertook a provincial tour with the Orchestral Union in 1855 and again in 1856. In 1854, Jean Prosper began a parallel career, selling musical instruments. He was also approached as a consultant by the London firm Huggett, makers of wind instruments. He may also have consulted with Courtois in the development of a twelfth key for the ophicleide but the source has not been verified.

== Retirement ==
Jean Prosper's health declined severely in 1858. In spite of this, Prospère continued to play the ophicleide as far as he was able. Perhaps his final engagement was at the first Leeds Music Festival on 9 September 1858.

He moved back to France with his wife and Henrietta, his youngest daughter, while Hyacinthe Helen remained in London where she married James Franklin Fuller. Joseph Prosper also continued to live in london where he played in Henry Distin's Ventil Horn Union and the London Rifle Brigade band. Leaving Henrietta at Louise's mother's home in Avesnes-Sur-Helpe, Jean Prosper and Louise continued south to Marseilles where his brothers Joseph and Jean Baptiste were living. Prospère's health was rapidly declining, and on 18 November 1862, he died at his home, 47 Rue Terrusse, aged forty eight years. In an undated letter to the Royal Society of Musicians, Jean Prosper's son Joseph Prosper asks for funeral expenses to be made available to Louise, who, in her grief, had been removed temporarily from the house and placed "under restraint".

== After Prospère ==
Prospère's solos were occasionally rendered by later ophicleidists. At the third and final of three Subscription Concerts at St George's Hall, West Bromwich in 1863, the Orchestral Union played, with a Mr. Samuel Prince conducting. "The only instrumental solo was Prospere's variations of "There's nae Luck", for the ophicleide, played remarkably well by Mr. E. Wills."

Joseph Prosper had been required to begin national service at the town of his birth, Avesnes-Sur-Helpe, from his twentieth birthday on 26 October 1862. However on learning of the death of his father, the military board entered him onto a lottery whereby certain soldiers would be exempted from duty. He was duly freed on the grounds that he was 'fils unique de veuve,' the only son of a widow. He returned to London in 1863 and began to work for Alphonse Villin, who had been importing strings for musical instruments since 1856. They became business partners in 1872 but two years later Villin took Guivier to court and the business was dissolved. Both resumed work in 1875 as sole traders but whereas Villin's venture closed within 10 years, Joseph Prosper's has continued to this day and has become one of the foremost violin dealers in the UK.

== Biographical errors ==
Erroneous claims have been made for the Guivier family's ancestry, most notably in two works on the lineage of aristocratic families. In 1860, Jean Prosper's eldest daughter, Hyacinthe Palmire Hélène (known as Helen), a working-class woman, married James Franklin Fuller, an architect from a respectable Irish family. In their reference to Helen Guivier, the authors of both works claim that Jean Prosper's father had been a Napoleonic general. One book claims that he was a Corsican baron who died in the retreat from Moscow, while the second attempts to link the Guiviers with Marshall Gouvion St-Cyr by blending the two surnames together. The origin of these claims is obscure, but they may have been manufactured to reconcile Helen's social standing with the Fullers. The army pension records for Prospère's widowed mother makes it clear that Etienne Simon had been a rank-and-file soldier, and Jean Prosper's wedding contract describes his father as a fusilier.
