= Volley gun =

Gun with multiple single-shot barrels

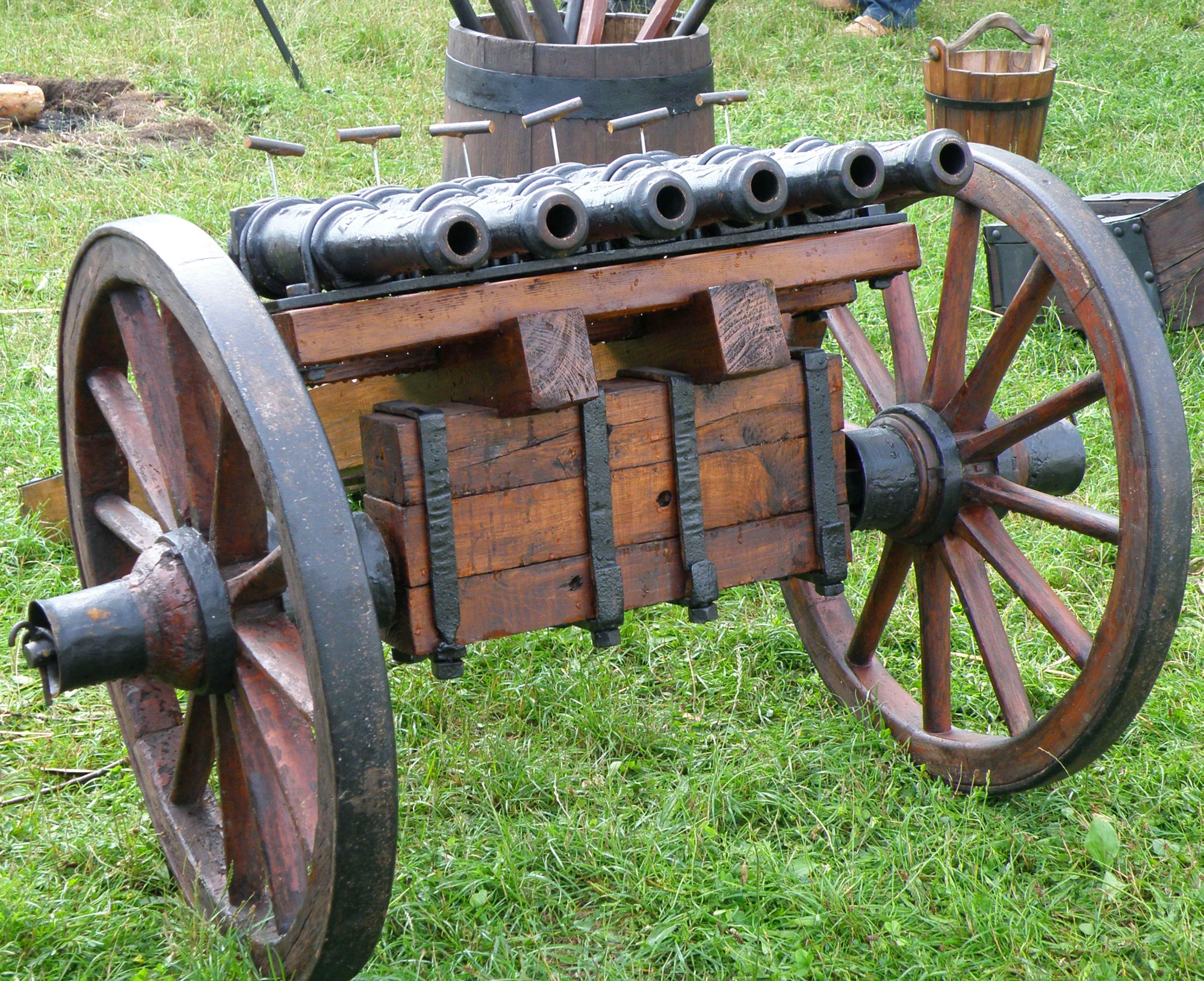
Volley guns at a historical reenactment of the 1656 Battle of Warsaw

A volley gun is a gun with multiple single-shot barrels that volley fired simultaneously or sequentially in quick succession. Their volume of fire is limited by the number of barrels bundled together.

In practice, large volley guns were not particularly more useful than a cannon firing canister shot or grapeshot. Since they were still mounted on a carriage, they could be as hard to aim and move around as a cannon, and the many barrels took as long or longer to reload. They also tended to be relatively expensive since they were more complex than a cannon, due to all the barrels and ignition fuses, and each barrel had to be individually loaded, unloaded, maintained, and cleaned.

== 15th-17th century volley guns ==
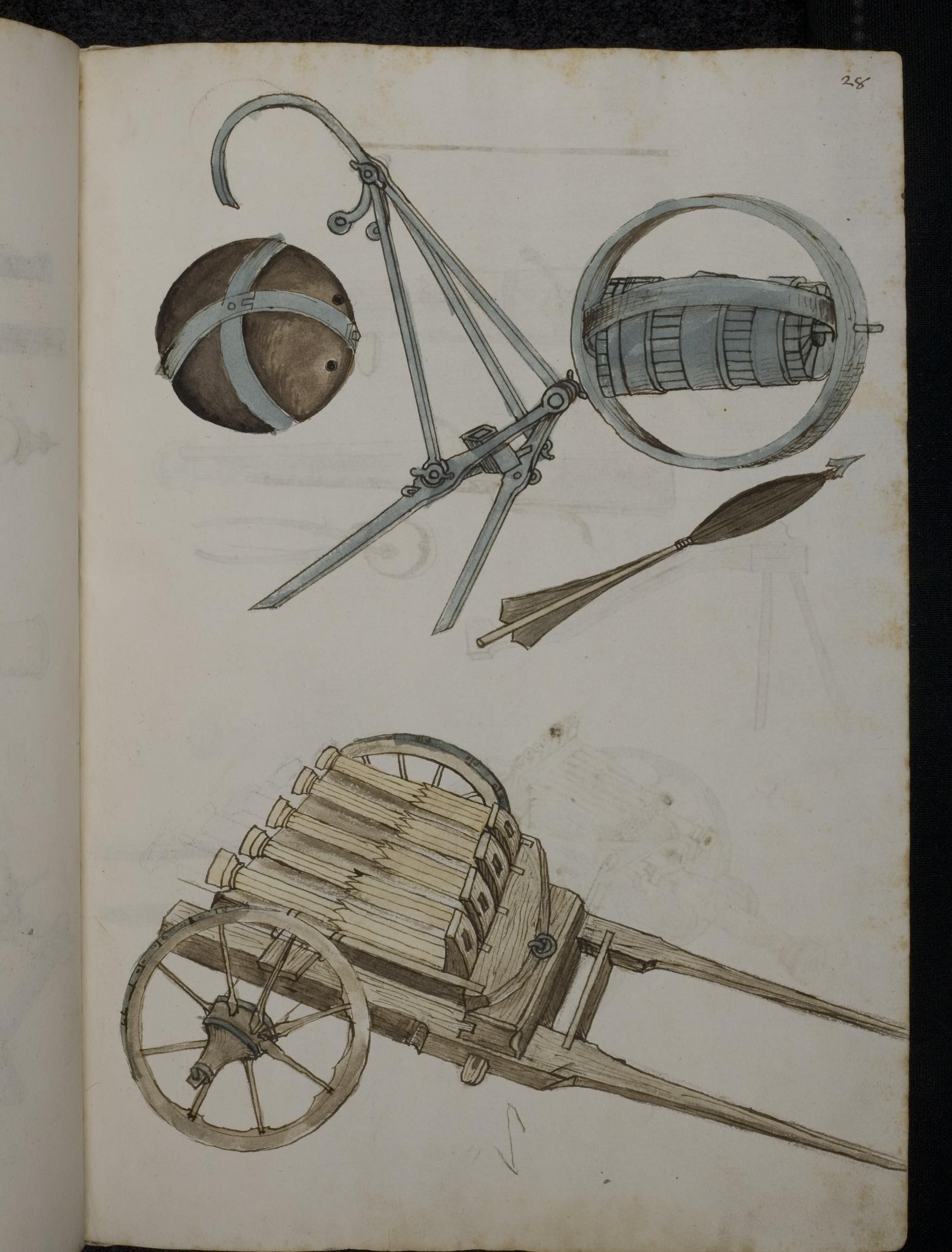
Depiction of a German volley gun in a work from the 15th century

The ribauldequin, or organ gun, was a medieval version of the volley gun. It had its barrels set up in parallel. This early version was first employed during the Hundred Years' War by the army of Edward III of England, in 1339. Later on, the late Swiss army employed it.

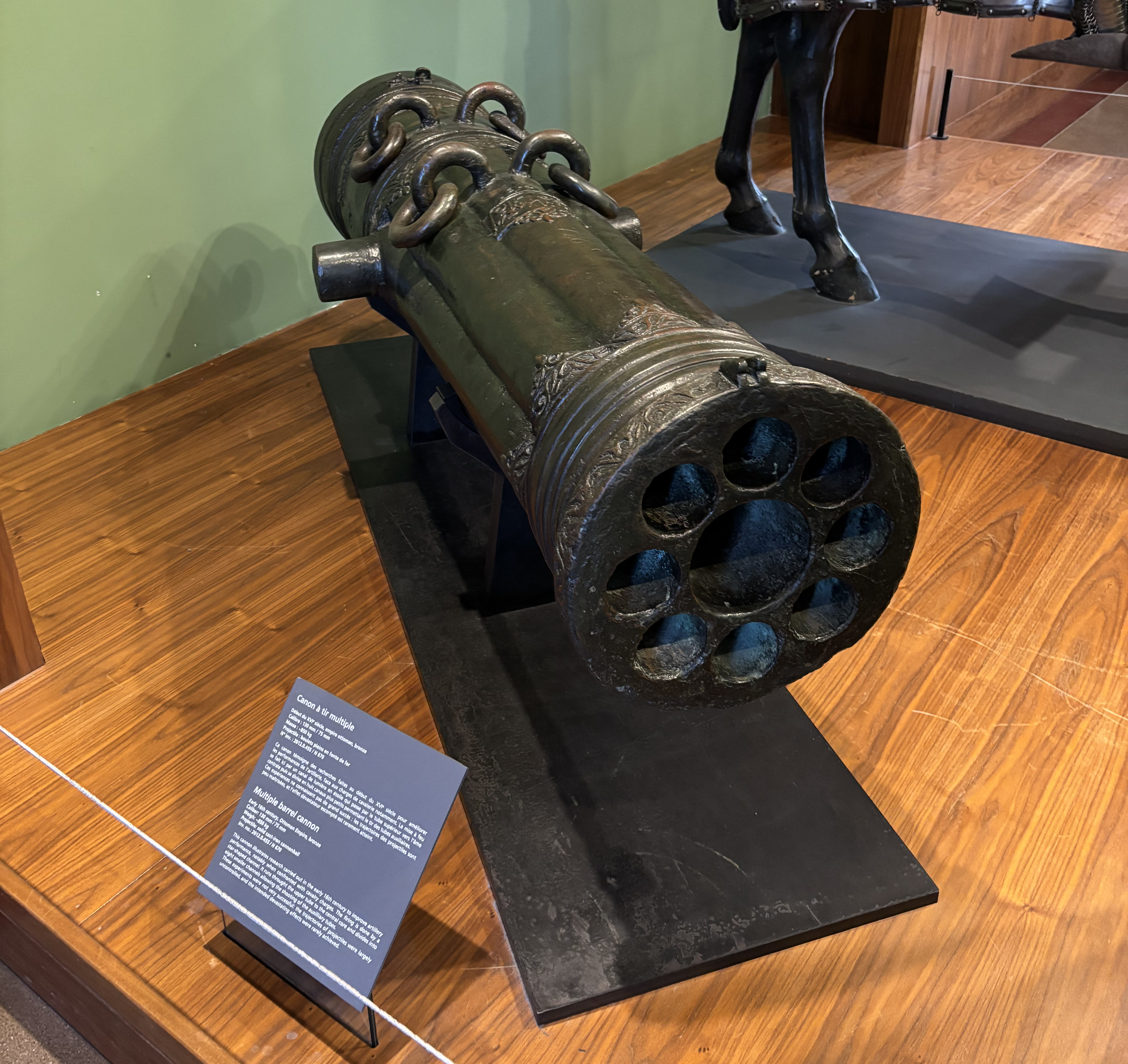
Ottoman Empire volley gun with 9 barrels, early 16th century, Army Museum (Paris)

In the mid-1570s a volley gun which was capable of holding from 160 to 320 shots and firing them 4, 8, 12 or 24 bullets at a time, referred to as an 'ingen of war', was presented to the government of England. Multi-barreled artillery pieces continued in use during the 16th and 17th century. A double-barreled cannon called Elizabeth-Henry, named after Charles I's youngest children, was used by the Cavaliers during the English Civil War and fired 2oz charges or grapeshot. The barrels were wrapped in leather to prevent rusting.

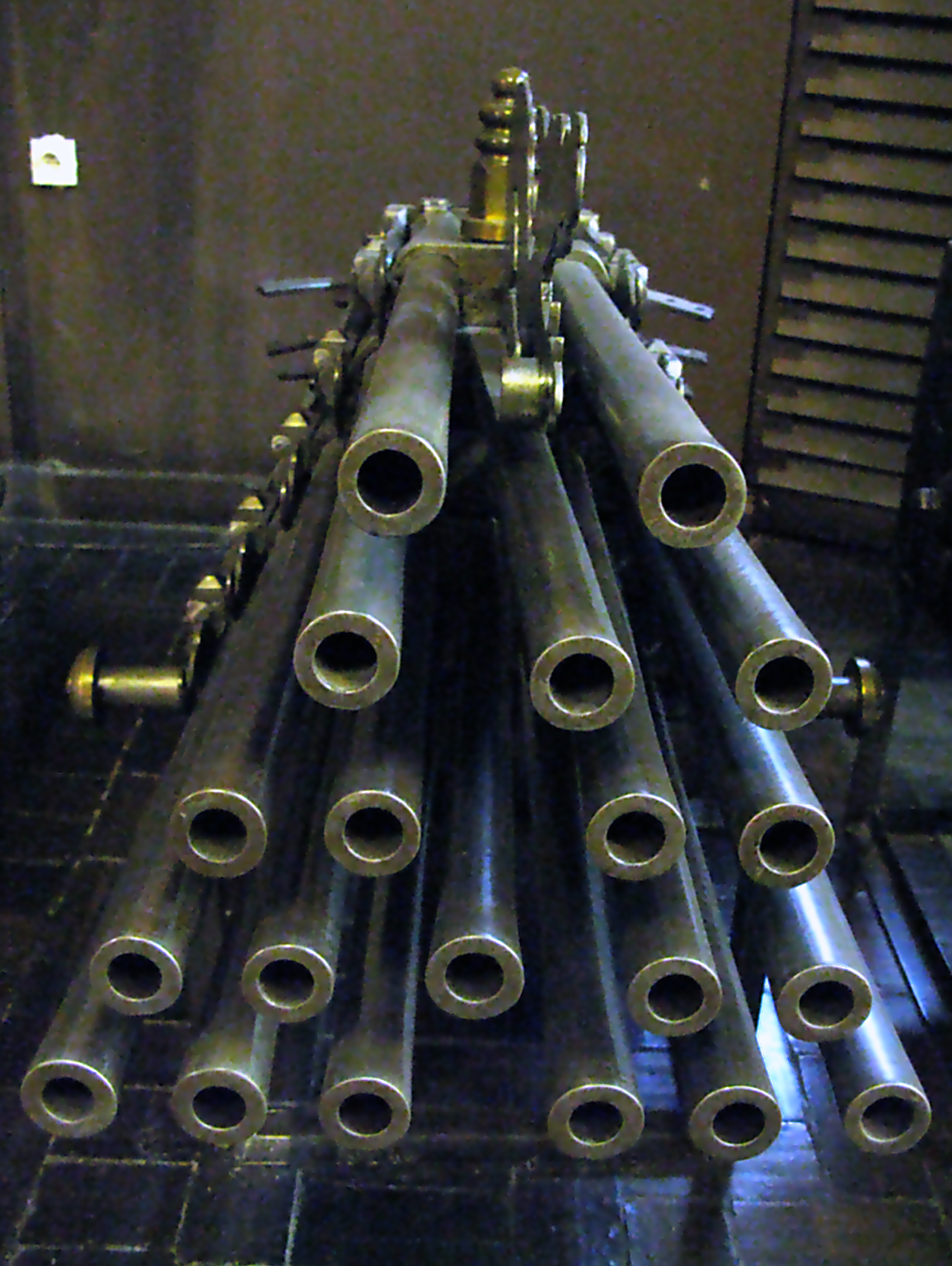
Polish 20-barrel artillery piece, 16-17 century. The barrels are designed to enable the shot to spread out and cause maximum damage

On the continent, 16th century Aragon developed a 15-barrel volley gun; German and Polish gunsmiths invented handheld multi-barrel guns. These were sometimes combination sword and axe pistols such as Henry VIII's Walking Staff, a 3-barreled gun and battle mace. Henry VIII also owned a multi-barreled German wheel lock rifle capable of firing a superimposed charge.

== 18th-century volley guns ==
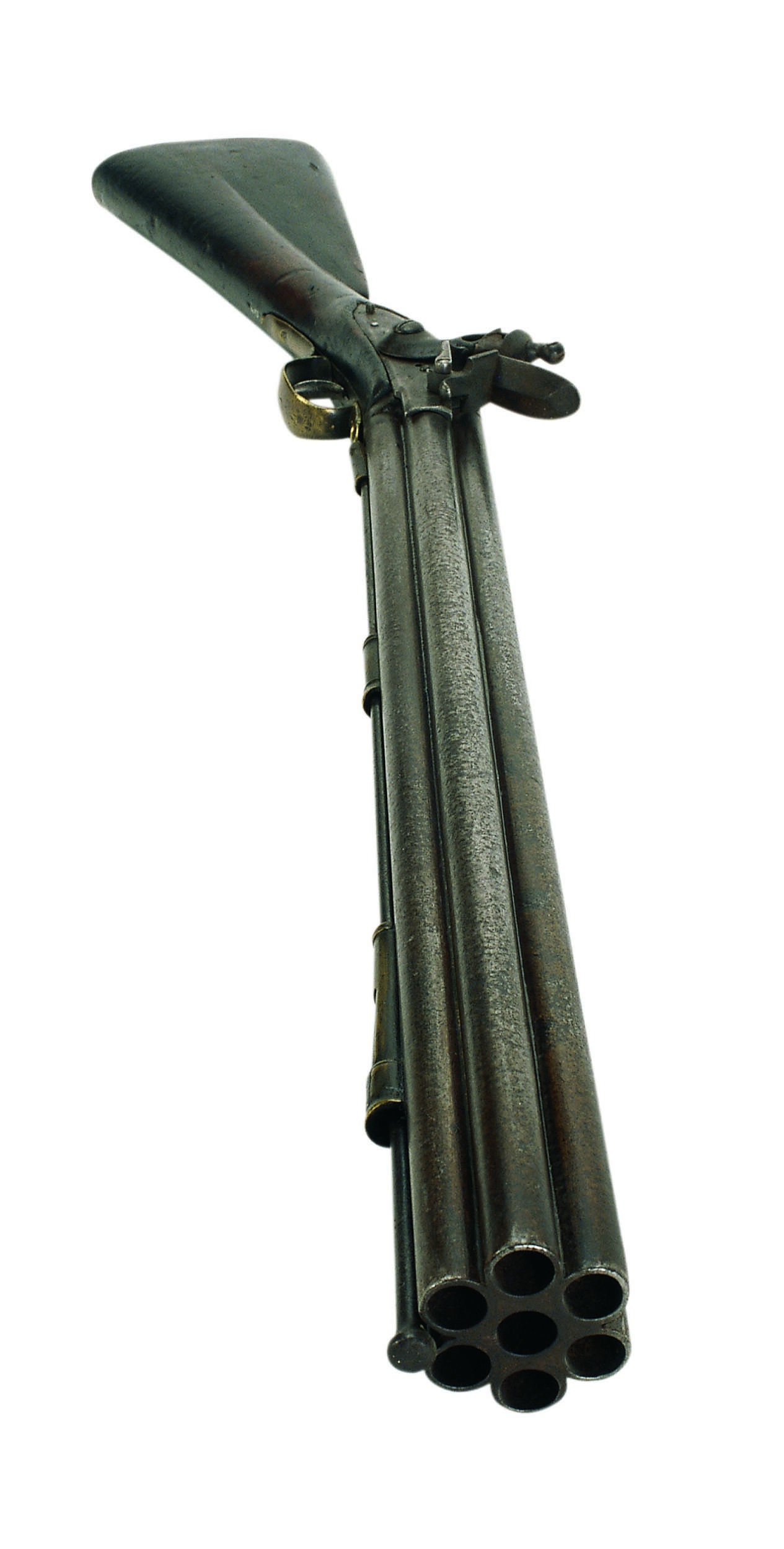
A Nock gun

The Nock gun resembled a conventional flintlock musket with seven barrels hexagonally brazed around a central barrel. All seven .46 caliber (12 mm) barrels were connected to the single flintlock pan in a manner intended to produce simultaneous discharge through row ignition, but one or more barrels frequently failed to fire. The gun was invented by James Wilson in 1779 and manufactured by Henry Nock for use through the Napoleonic Wars. Five hundred Nock guns were produced for the Royal Navy intended for use in repelling boarders or to clear an enemy deck in advance of friendly boarding parties. Admiral Howe's fleet was issued twenty guns for each ship of the line and twelve guns for each frigate. Recoil of the 13-pound (5.9 kg) Nock gun caused dislocated shoulders and clavicle fractures among the sailors firing Nock guns; and the muzzle flash from simultaneous discharge of multiple barrels could ignite canvas sail when fired from positions in the rigging. The Nock volley gun was considered obsolete by 1805, but a surviving weapon was carried by Richard Widmark in the 1960 movie The Alamo. The Nock gun was recently brought to public attention by its inclusion in Bernard Cornwell's Sharpe novels where it was wielded by both Sharpe and his friend and colleague Sergeant Patrick Harper.

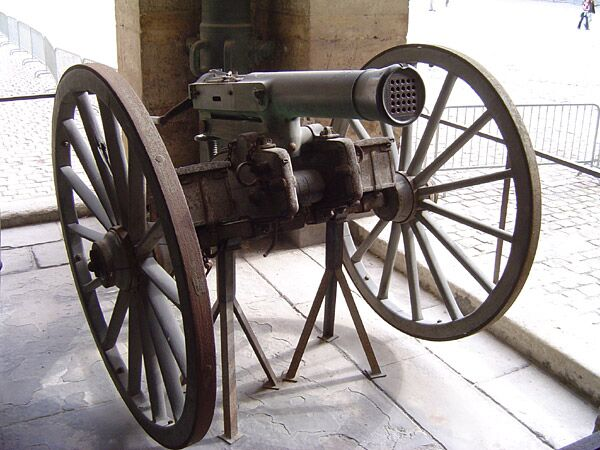
The mitrailleuse, a 19th-century volley gun

A breech-loading volley gun that was reloaded using multiple breech pieces, similar to the later mitrailleuse, was developed in France in 1775 by a Du Perron.

== 19th-early 20th century volley guns ==
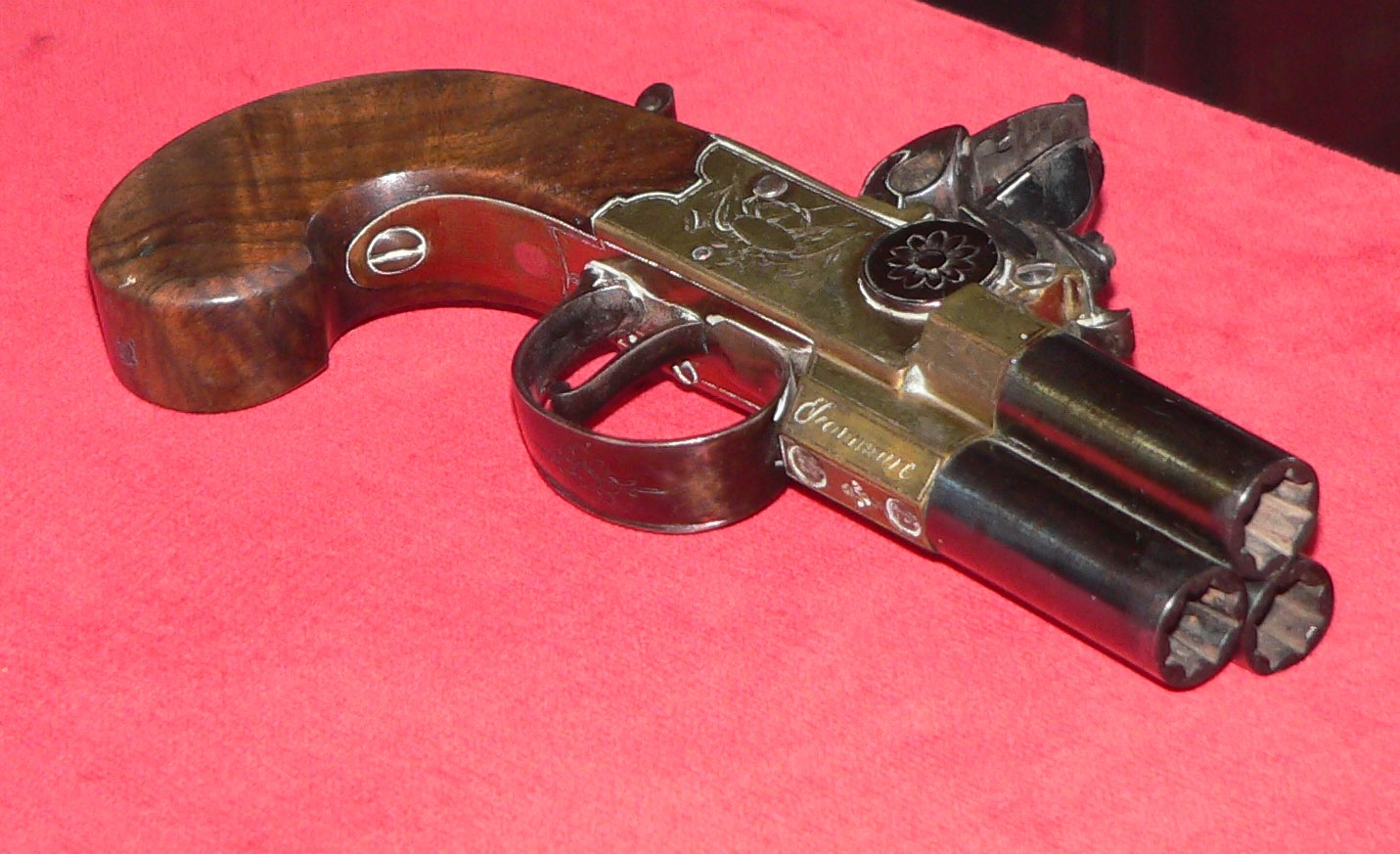
Three-barrel tap-action pocket pistol capable of firing all barrels simultaneously or sequentially using a rotating block in the pan.

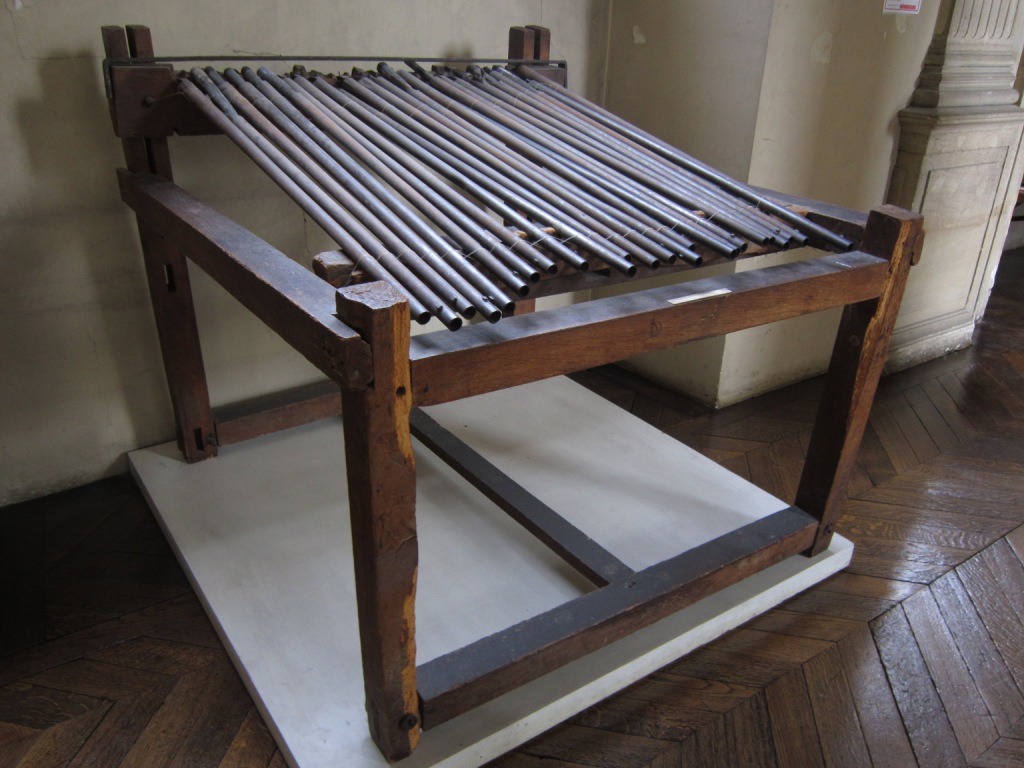
Fieschi's Machine infernale, Musée des Archives Nationales, Paris (2012)

Two notable artillery-sized volley guns were developed in the mid-19th century, although neither was particularly successful in practice. Developed in the 1860s and based on an 1850s design by a captain Fafschamps, the French mitrailleuse is an example of a multi-barreled volley gun that could fire all of its barrels simultaneously or sequentially over a short period of time. Also developed in the 1860s, General Origen Vandenburgh of the New York State Militia designed a weapon that had eighty-five parallel .50 caliber rifle barrels. After failing to sell the weapon to the United Kingdom, he reportedly sold a small number to the Confederate States of America, although there is some record that they were actually used. One Vandenburgh gun was located at Fort Fisher, North Carolina, and another reportedly at Salisbury, North Carolina.

In the First Schleswig War, the Danish army used a type of volley gun known as the 'Espignol' (sometimes 'Espingol'). These were developed by Andreas Anthon Frederik Schumacher in the 1820s and '30s, and used pre-loaded barrels mounted on a gun carriage. Each barrel was loaded with 16 to 32 shots and charges, which would fire in turn after ignition. The spent barrels would be replaced on the carriage by fresh ones, rather than reloaded. reloading would be performed in workshops.

A few hand-held volley guns were also developed during the 18th and 19th centuries. One of the most distinctive was the "duck's foot" volley gun, a pistol with multiple barrels arranged in a splayed pattern, so that the firer could spray a sizable area with a single shot. The principle behind this type of pistol is one of confrontation by one person against a group; hence, it was popular among bank guards, prison wardens and sea captains in the early 19th century.

In July 1835, Giuseppe Marco Fieschi used a home-made, 25-barrel volley gun to attempt the assassination of King Louis Philippe I in Paris. He fired the weapon from a third-floor window while the king and his entourage were passing in the street below. Eighteen people were killed, but the King only received a minor wound. The gun barrels had been sold as scrap by a government arsenal after being labelled as defective and four of them burst when fired. Fieschi was badly injured and was quickly captured. He and two others involved in the plot were condemned to death and guillotined in 1836. His volley gun, known as the infernal machine, is preserved at the Musée des Archives Nationales in Paris.

The Nordenfelt gun (also called the Palmcrantz-Nordenfeldt in Brazilian sources) was a multi-barrel, lever-operated volley gun patented by Swedish engineer Helge Palmcrantz in 1873 and financed by London-based Swedish banker Thorsten Nordenfelt, whose name the weapon took. In 1882, the Brazilian Navy adopted it in two calibres: 8 mm Kropatschek (rifle) and 25 mm (1 inch), the latter intended as an anti-torpedo-boat weapon. In 1889, the Brazilian Army followed suit, equipping each infantry battalion and cavalry regiment with two Nordenfelts, complementing Gatling guns it had acquired in 1872. The system was later outclassed by the Maxim gun, and the Nordenfelt company merged with the Maxim Gun Company in 1888.

During the Russo-Japanese War, A Russian Army officer Captain Shmetillo, seeing a need for volleyfire and automatic weapons invented a volley firing device called "Shmillo Machine Gun", to use captured bolt-action rifles in Port Arthur to serve this "machine gun" role. Most were made using Chinese Hanyang rifles, but few examples used 5x M1888 Mannlichers hooked up together with a bulletproof shield. One pull and push of a bracket cycled all the guns in unison.

== Modern connection ==
A number of designs of electronically fired explosive-propulsion projectile weapons and non-explosive projectile weapons were developed by Metal Storm Limited which had some similarities to 18th-century volley guns, particularly in that they use many barrels, which can all be fired once simultaneously or sequentially, such as the Nordenfelt gun. These designs met with little commercial interest and Metal Storm Limited entered administration in 2012.

The Spanish Navy uses a volley gun system, the Meroka, which consists of twelve Oerlikon 20 mm cannons mounted in a tight cluster with an externally powered automatic loading system. It delivers an exceptionally high rate of fire for a very short burst, and reloads in less than 0.3 seconds. This makes it suitable for close-range defense against missiles, aircraft, watercraft, coastal targets, and floating mines.

In 2019, Standard Manufacturing introduced the S333 Thunderstruck, a double-barreled revolver which fires two rounds with each pull of the trigger.

== See also ==
- Billinghurst Requa Battery
- Double-barreled cannon
- Multiple-barrel firearm
- Multiple rocket launcher
- Nock gun
- Organ gun
- Pepperbox
- Ripley machine gun
- Wall gun
- Hwacha
