= Infernal machine (weapon) =

25-barrel volley gun made by Giuseppe Marco Fieschi in 1835

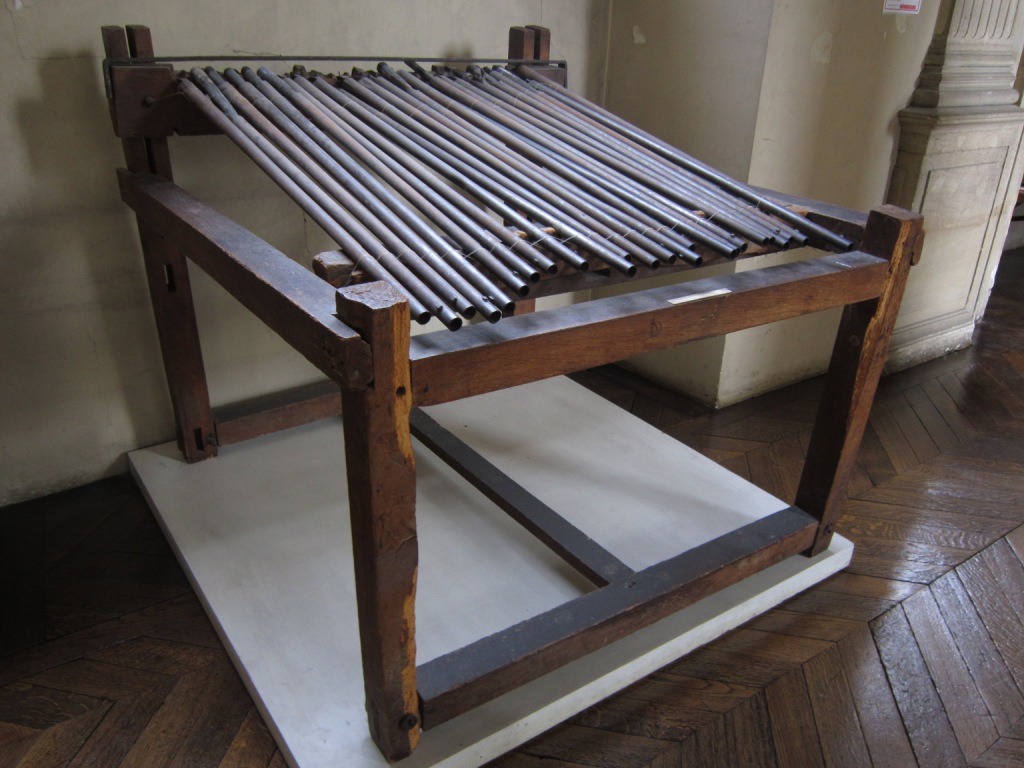
- Fieschi's infernal machine at the Musée des Archives Nationales (2012)
- Type: Volley gun
- Place of origin: France

Production history
- Designer: Giuseppe Marco Fieschi
- Designed: 1835
- No. built: 1

Specifications
- Length: 3.3 ft (1.0 m)
- Width: 3.3 ft (1.0 m)
- Height: 4 ft (1.2 m)
- Barrels: 25
- Feed system: Manual feed
- Sights: No sights

The infernal machine (French: machine infernale) is a homemade 25-barrel volley gun built by Giuseppe Marco Fieschi and used in his failed assassination attempt on King Louis Philippe I of France on July 28, 1835. The original gun is now on display at the Musée des Archives Nationales in Paris, France.

== Design ==
Described as a "supergun", the infernal machine was designed to fire 25 rifle barrels at the same time. Each barrel was originally believed to have been loaded with eight bullets and twenty lead pellets, but a thorough inspection of the misfired barrels by Jean Le Page, Arquebusier Ordinaire to the King, showed that each barrel contained about 3.5–4 in (8.9–10.2 cm) of gunpowder, 6 to 8 balls, two layers of wadding, and 13 to 14 slugs.

The weapon, built of wood and metal, was constructed in a room overlooking the street on the third floor of N. 50 Boulevard du Temple, where it was later used for the failed assassination of Louis Philippe I. The barrels were mounted side by side with each touch hole in line with the next. In combination with a trail of gunpowder, the barrels could all be fired at once with a single fuse; in Fieschi's case, charcoal was used. The weapon was measured by Le Page to be approximately 3.3 ft (1.0 m) in length and width and 4 ft (1.2 m) high.

French artillery officers, who inspected the machine after the assassination attempt, speculated that if Fieschi had been an artillery man or otherwise known more about designing weaponry, he would have been successful in his assassination attempt of the king and his staff. Had he constructed it so that the gunfire diverged and crossed as opposed to the parallel and converging implementation, the attack might have killed up to 200 additional people and "literally torn the King and his staff to pieces".

== Failed assassination attempt ==
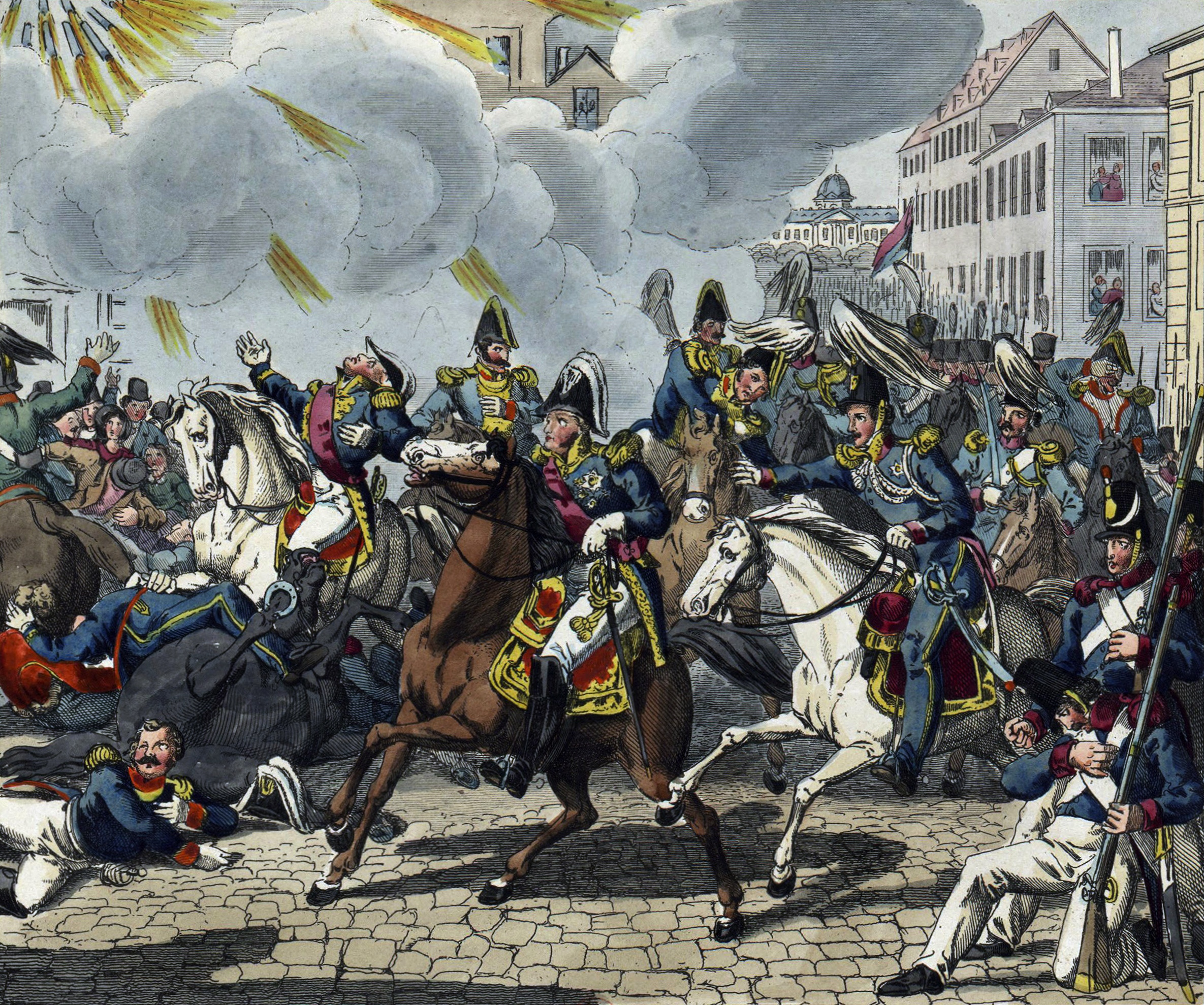
Assassination attempt on King Louis Philippe I of France on July 28, 1835

On July 28, 1835, Fieschi attempted to assassinate King Louis Philippe I using the infernal machine. The gun was positioned on the windowsill in Fieschi's three-room lodging on the third floor of N. 50 Boulevard du Temple in Paris, overlooking the street on the route that the king and his convoy were expected to take as part of the yearly Paris National Guard inspection.

When the convoy was passing directly below, Fieschi, waiting in ambush, fired the infernal machine. The gun fired a volley of approximately 400 projectiles, even though four barrels misfired, four barrels burst, and one of the 25 barrels was not loaded as it did not have a touch hole and could not be fired. The king only suffered a graze to the forehead, a minor injury, but 18 people were either immediately killed or later succumbed to their wounds. An additional 22 people were injured, and at least four of these had limbs amputated due to the severity of their injuries.

When he fired the weapon, Fieschi suffered severe wounds to his head, face, and hand. He fled from his lodgings and was later captured by authorities after they followed the trail of blood from his injuries. It was believed that Fieschi could have successfully escaped had he not been injured by the gun's discharge. Fieschi was guillotined along with the weapon's financiers Pierre Morey and Théodore Pépin on 19 February 1836 in Paris.

== Legacy ==
The original gun is on display at the Musée des Archives Nationales, the state museum of French history, in Paris. A replica of the weapon is on display at the Musée de la préfecture de police, the museum of police history.

== See also ==
- Ribauldequin
