= Promenade concert =

Musical performance

Promenade concerts were musical performances in the 18th and 19th century pleasure gardens of London, where the audience would stroll about while listening to the music. The term derives from the French se promener, "to walk".

Today, the term promenade concert is often associated with the BBC Proms summer classical music concert series founded in 1895 by Robert Newman and the conductor Henry Wood.

== Eighteenth century ==
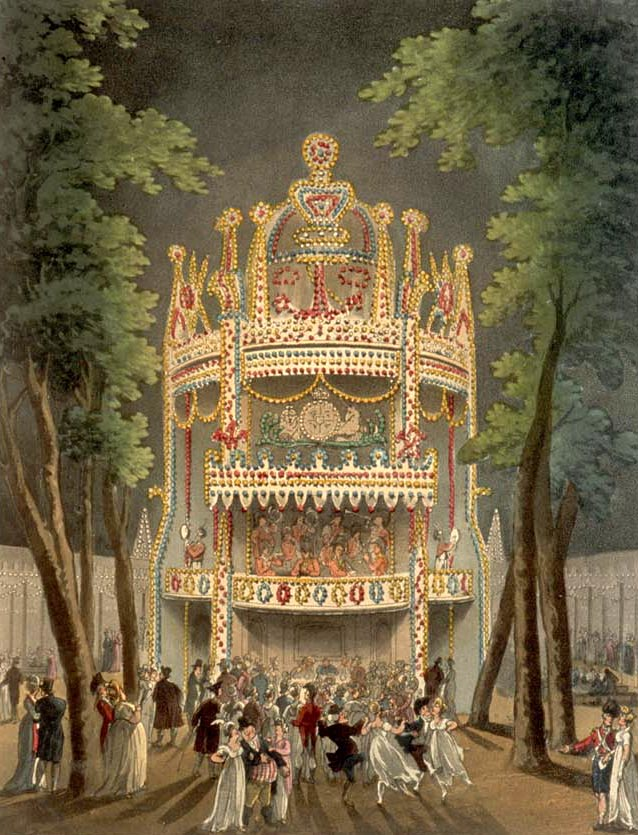
Vauxhall Gardens, from the Microcosm of London, 1810

Pleasure gardens, which levied a small entrance fee and provided a variety of entertainment, had become extremely popular in London by the eighteenth century. Music was provided from bandstands (known as ‘’orchestras’’) or more permanent buildings, and was generally of the popular variety: ballroom dances, quadrilles (medleys), cornet solos etc. Other entertainments would have included fireworks, masquerades and acrobatics. There were 38 gardens which are known to have provided music. Perhaps the most famous of these were Vauxhall Gardens (1661–1859), south of the Thames. Known at first as New Spring Gardens this was the favourite haunt of diarists Samuel Pepys and John Evelyn. The music of Handel was very popular here in the eighteenth century, and in 1738 there was even a statue erected of Handel playing the lyre. The Gardens were described as fashionable in the late 18th and early 19th century by Fanny Burney and William Thackeray. Aristocracy and royalty mingled with the ordinary folk. On 21 April 1749 twelve thousand people paid 2s 6d each to hear Handel rehearsing his Music for the Royal Fireworks in Vauxhall Gardens, causing a three-hour traffic jam on London Bridge. The music had been commissioned by the king in celebration of the Treaty of Aix-la-Chapelle. The performance six days later in Green Park was even more spectacular, especially when the building caught fire. The composer Dr Thomas Arne was appointed composer of Vauxhall Gardens in 1745. It was here that many of his songs achieved their great popularity. The musicians were housed in a covered building while the audience strolled outside. In the nineteenth century Sir Henry Bishop was the official composer to the Gardens. Many of his songs, which include "Home! Sweet Home!", were performed there. Vauxhall Gardens remained a national institution until 1859.

Another prestige venue for promenade concerts was Ranelagh Gardens (1742–1803). Here both musicians and audience were under cover in a gigantic Georgian rotunda which can be seen in a painting of Canaletto in the National Gallery. It was here that Wolfgang Amadeus Mozart performed on the harpsichord and organ as a child prodigy in 1764. Joseph Haydn, too, appeared here during his visits to London.

== Nineteenth century ==
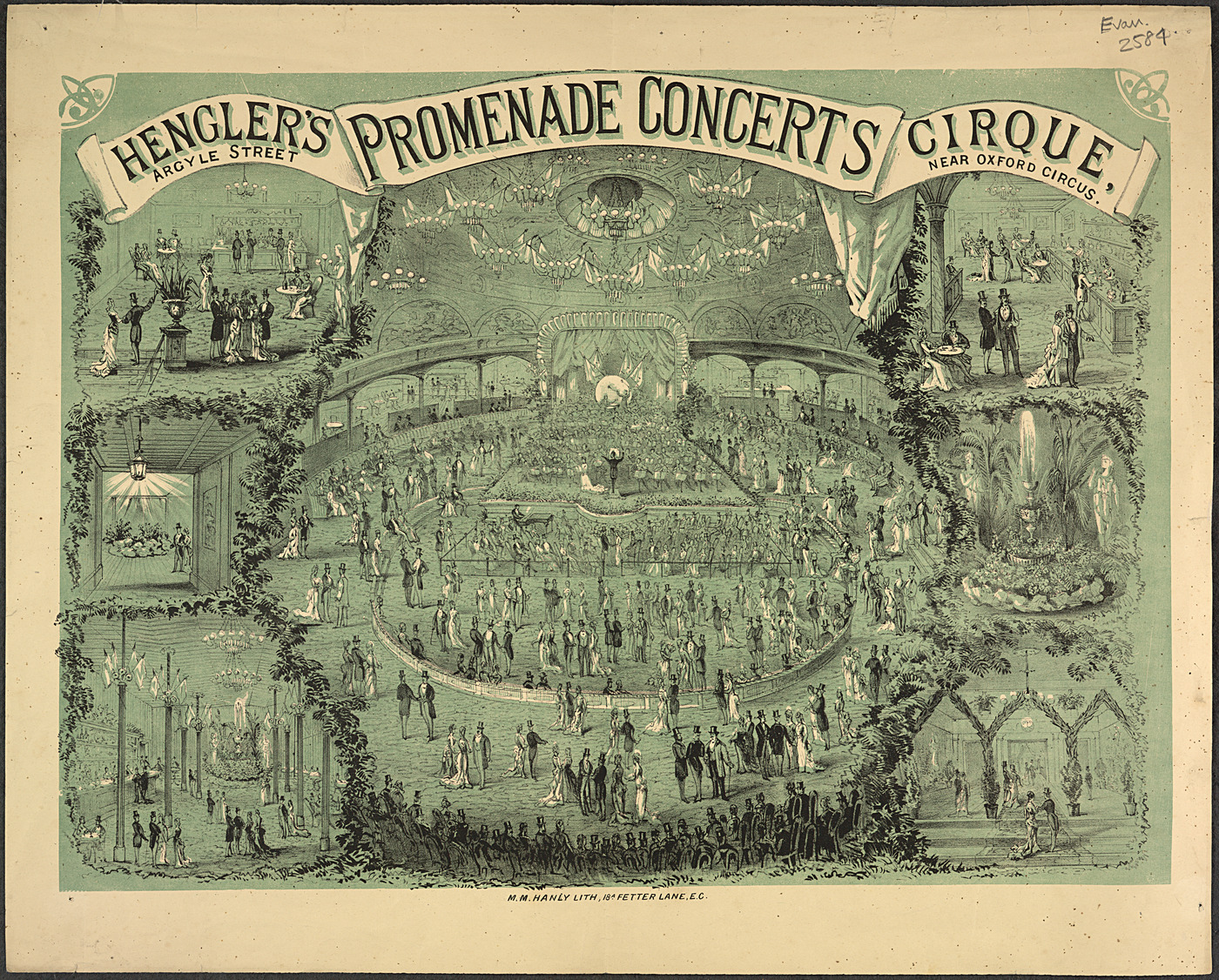
A c. 1880 poster for promenade concerts at Hengler's Circus, on the site of the present-day London Palladium

The term "promenade concert" seems to have been first used in England in 1838 when London’s Lyceum Theatre announced ‘Promenade Concerts à la Musard’. Philippe Musard was a French musician who had introduced open-air concerts in the English style in Paris.

Musard came to England in 1840 to conduct concerts in the Lyceum Theatre. His programmes consisted of overtures, waltzes, popular instrumental solos and quadrilles. The success of these concerts led to further musical promenade concerts, both in London and other places including Bath and Birmingham. The Crown and Anchor Tavern in the Strand gave a series of concerts with the band of the Theatre Royal, Drury Lane under the direction of Henri Valentino. In 1840 Edward Eliason, leader of the orchestra of Drury Lane Theatre, started a series of Concerts d’été with an orchestra of nearly a hundred players.

Soon there was also a series of ‘’Concerts d’hiver’’ under Louis Antoine Jullien (1812–1860). Jullien was a sound musician whose performances were combined with outrageous showmanship: Beethoven was conducted with a jewelled baton. With his extravagant clothing and long black hair and moustache he would go through a series of antics including having his white kid gloves brought to him on a silver salver. He conducted with his back to the orchestra in order to face his audience, and his orchestra were often joined by the bands of the Royal Artillery or drummers from the French Garde Nationale. He died in a lunatic asylum.

Jullien was succeeded by the English conductor Alfred Mellon (1820–1867), and then Luigi Arditi (1822–1903). Another notable conductor was August Manns (1825–1907) who is associated with the Saturday concerts at London’s Crystal Palace, the enormous glass building which housed the Great Exhibition in 1851.

== Repertoire ==
The pleasure gardens were the chief institutions for the performance of music by English composers. Songs and vocal pieces were composed especially for them. Strophic ballads were the staple diet. The songs were often on pastoral subjects, or drinking songs, hunting songs or even songs on morbid subjects.

Two famous songs written for the gardens were Arne's Shakespeare setting Where the bee sucks, and Charles Edward Horn's setting of Herrick’s Cherry Ripe. Gradually opera started to influence the style of music, and larger concerted pieces would be heard. Choruses from Handel's oratorios were often included. Instrumental music included the popular concerto. Organ music was played between the acts of ballad operas (Vauxhall and Ranelagh both had organs installed). Cremorne Gardens (1836–78) became Ranelagh’s natural successor in Chelsea during the Victorian period, presenting works by Boieldieu, Auber and Offenbach in the 1870s.

In the late 19th century concerts under August Manns explored works by well-known composers: Brahms, Liszt, Mendelssohn, Schubert, Schumann, Smetana and Wagner. London audiences were starting to become more discerning and exploratory. In 1895 Henry Wood began the series of promenade concerts that continue today as the BBC Proms. From the middle of the 20th century, open-air summer concerts at English country houses have revived the original tradition of the London pleasure gardens.

== See also ==
- The dictionary definition of promenade concert at Wiktionary
