= Philippe Musard =

French conductor and composer (1792–1859)

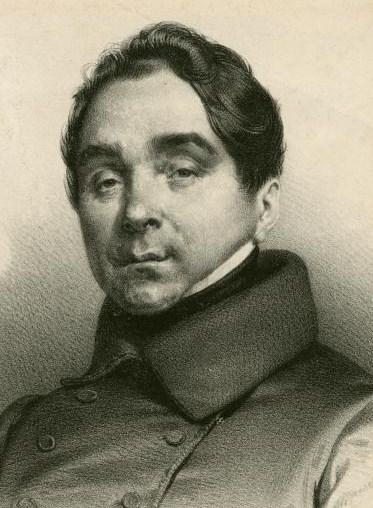
- Born: 8 November 1792; Tours
- Died: 31 March 1859 (aged 66); Auteuil (now part of Paris)
- Other names: Napoléon Musard, "Lord of Quadrilles and Galops"
- Occupations: composer, conductor, concert promoter

Philippe Musard (8 November 1792 – 31 March 1859) was a French composer who was crucial to the development and popularity of the promenade concert. One of the most famous personalities of Europe during the 1830s and 1840s, his concerts in Paris and London were riotous (in several senses of the word) successes. Best known for his "galop" and "quadrille" pieces, he composed many of these numbers himself, usually borrowing famous themes of other composers. Musard plays an important role in the development of light classical music, the faculty of publicity in music, and in the role of the conductor as a musical celebrity. He has been largely forgotten subsequent to his retirement in the early 1850s.

== History ==
Philippe Musard was born in Tours on 8 November 1792 to parents of limited financial means. Musard joined a unit of the Imperial Guards as a cornet player. His musical career began in the outskirts of Paris, where he played the horn for low-class dances public halls, for which he composed some music. When Napoleon was defeated, he moved to London, started as a violinist, and eventually his career progressed to the point of leading the orchestra of King George IV and organized balls, becoming wealthy in the process. Between 1821 and 1825 many of his compositions were published in London, and some of these were performed in Paris. Musard moved back to Paris following the July Revolution on 1830 and established a series of concerts at Cours-la-Reine. He attended the Conservatoire de Paris and obtained first prize in harmony in 1831. He studied privately under Anton Reicha.

In 1832 Paris was gripped by fear of an impending cholera outbreak, which was then devastating England. With the help of a financier, Musard produced concerts at the Théâtre des Variétés which catered to the resulting hedonism of the time. After a time Musard had a falling out with his financial partner, but soon was able to independently produce his concerts. Central to these concerts was a can-can of "lascivious spectacle" involving girls dressed in only feather boas and gloves. Such was the frenetic delirium of these concerts that writers of the time compared them to a civil war, or even a massacre. Initially these concerts caused considerable scandal, but the government decided to tolerate them as a "safety valve" to prevent further civil disturbance. His 1833 concerts were at a hall, later called the Salle Valentino on Rue Saint-Honoré. By this time Musard had attained huge personal popularity, and his concerts evolved into relatively sedate promenade concerts. In these concerts the audience was free to move around the concert area, and activities included dancing to quadrilles, waltzes, and other forms of dance, drinking, and eating. The music prominently featured was composed by Musard, as well as other composers in vogue at the time such as Daniel Auber and Gioachino Rossini. Musard acquired further substantial wealth as a result of these concerts, where he not only conducted, but created and managed the orchestras. He composed music specifically for these concerts in prolific fashion, and his ability as a conductor was noted.

He experienced some health issues within his chest in 1836 and became a patient of Samuel and Mélanie Hahnemann. As a result, he became an ardent supporter of homeopathy. The summer of 1837 saw Musard performing at a large facility on Champs-Élysées, and in the winter moving back to the Salle Valentino. Here Musard, after experiencing stiff competition from Johann Strauss Sr., endeavored to collaborate with his Viennese counterpart. Strauss would conduct the first half of the concert, whereupon Musard would take over for the second part. This proved a great success, and for a time Musard was given the title "Strauss of the Quadrille" and Strauss called "the Musard of the Waltz." 1837 also saw a rumor take root that Musard had died, and a general outpouring of grief ensued. His popularity was eclipsed for a time in the late 1830s by his friend Louis-Antoine Jullien, who tried to out-Musard Musard by using such devices as artillery where Musard merely used a pistol. However, Musard was restored to Parisian prominence upon Jullien's sudden departure from Paris on account of Jullien's great debts. In 1838 the first concerts "à la Musard" were held in London, held in numerous locations and led by conductors ranging in prestige from Strauss to Pilati. Musard's name was carried to the United States in December that same year by Francis Johnson in a series of "Concerts à la Musard". In the late 1830s the outdoor promenade concerts waned in popularity in Paris, but Musard was then appointed to the Paris Opera in 1840 as "Director of the Balls". When Musard's son Alfred (1828–1881), who succeeded him in music and in business, led a series of concerts in the United States his first name was hidden in a deliberate attempt to mislead potential audiences that the Quadrille King was present.

His reputation preceding him in England, Musard was expected to bring his concerts to Exeter Hall in October 1839, but these events never occurred as the shareholders disallowed them, feeling the comportment would violate the intended religious purpose of the building. Musard did arrive October, 1840 in London for a series of concerts at Drury Lane Theatre. He left December 19 that year, owing to previous engagements back in Paris, but returned to London at the Lyceum Theatre the following autumn, competing with Jullien. In the middle of the 1840s Musard's popularity began to decline. His last appearance in London occurred the summer of 1845, where he appeared at the Vauxhall Gardens, the Surrey Gardens, and at Queen Victoria's royal Costume Ball at Buckingham Palace. He owned an estate in Auteuil, at that point a wealthy suburban village, and became mayor of that location.

In September 1851 Musard suffered a stroke which left him befuddled and paralyzed on the right side. He was treated by the homeopath Charles Lethière, but suffered another stroke late in October, which greatly inhibited his reasoning ability. Musard was scheduled to conduct a series of winter concerts as usual, and Lethière and his son Alfred proceeded to assemble the accustomed large orchestra, with Alfred conducting. Lethière relates that upon arrival, Musard appeared completely oblivious to either his friends, or to the enthusiastic acclamations of the crowd. However, when the music started, Philippe "began to tremble violently" and "his eyes grew bright" and he snatched the baton from his son and began conducting with great vigor. He went on to conduct every one of his Paris concerts that season. He retired in 1852, still considered the "doyen of dance composers" in France, and proceeded to live quietly off of his savings. His life ended as one of great material wealth, but of great physical and mental difficulty. He died in Auteuil on 31 March 1859, almost completely forgotten in a short time; even the musical press barely noticed.

== Impact and influence ==
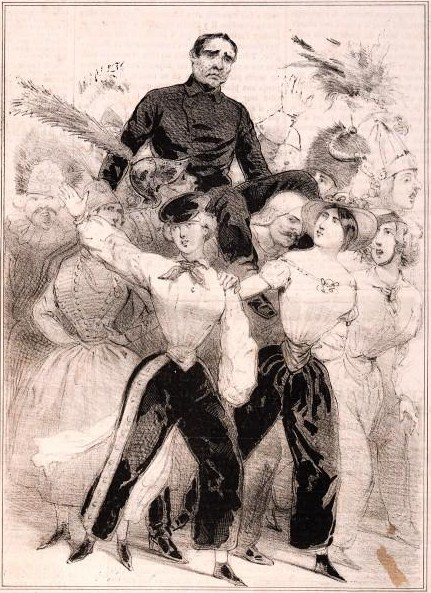
1846 print celebrating Musard

Musard's reputation was nothing short of international. Concerts in London were advertised as "a la Musard", as were those in the United States. Musard's concerts eventually developed into the concept of "light classical" music. His promenade concerts included standard classical fare in addition to the dance music. Cheaper than more formal concert settings, Musard's music was attended by the lower middle class and the working class, thereby introducing classical music to a broader audience, those who had never previously attended concerts and who viewed music purely as entertainment. The price for these concerts was set at 1 franc, in order to exclude the lowest classes. When his promenade concerts were exported to London, the price was likewise set at an attainable single shilling. His concerts were described in 1837 as "a musical paradise" in "a spacious hall furnished with mirrors, couches, ottomans, statues, fountains, and floral decorations, and at one end a café attended by a troupe of ‘perfumed waiters'". His orchestras were very large, containing as many as 48 violins, fourteen cornets, and a dozen trombones.

Musard became the first celebrity conductor. It was Musard, along with Jullien, who placed the conductor as a musician on par with the most prominent virtuosos. Audiences attended his concerts not only for the music, but to see the man himself in the act of leading the orchestra, regardless of the music being performed At climactic moments, Musard would dispose of his baton, throwing it into the audience, and rise to a standing position (standard practice at the time placed the conductor in a sitting position) to display his dominance over the happenings. Musard employed wild gestures including the hands, feet, arms, knees, and not the least grotesque facial expressions when leading. As a result, rumors circulated that he made a deal with the Devil, preceding Paganini's reputation, captured in poems such as:

Ce Musard infernal
C'est Satan qui conduit le bal!

This infernal Musard
It is Satan who leads the dance!

He was not considered attractive physically, having acquired significant scarring from smallpox, a yellow complexion, and had an unkempt appearance, always dressing in a black suit that was not measured properly. A small man, dancers and concert audiences would lift him up and carry him on their shoulders around the concert hall at the conclusion. He became one of the top celebrities in Paris, to the point that effigies made of chocolate, marzipan, and gingerbread were made of his "grotesque" figure and sold and consumed in great quantities throughout Paris.

Musard was an innovator in publicity for musical concerts. He used handbills and newspaper advertisers for promotional purposes. In this manner his influence on Francis Johnson was more important than his musical influence, thereby affecting the manner in which American music was promoted.

Because of the outstanding success of his concerts, Musard had many emulators. The most significant of these was Louis-Antoine Jullien. Other followers included Francis Johnson, Thomas Baker and his own son Alfred Musard.

Musard initiated his compositional career in a serious vein, writing three string quartets, as well as an academic paper on composition. Musard's musical innovations included the use of numerous instrumental soloists, as well as using sound effects (including breaking chairs and pistol shots) to signal important developments within the program. These unusual effects originated accidentally, when one of his players' chairs broke during the concert in an audibly significant fashion. Fortunately for Musard, the timing of the crash was in keeping with the music, and the audience greatly approved, thinking it a novel development of Musard's. Not to let an opportunity for greater spectacle pass, Musard immediately incorporated this as a regular part of his act. He became the first composer to assign trombones the principal melody. He borrowed heavily from compositions his listeners would recognize, which engendered some measure of criticism and legal action against his publishers. These famous pieces would be transformed into his gallops and quadrilles, transforming the character of the music into something "infernal". Some music critics felt that Musard "butchered" the music, and English critics considered Musard's re-working of Handel's Messiah to be a "profane desecration." However, even when using the work of others he employed effective counterpoint of his own device. He is credited with the invention of the "galop infernal." His compositions were widely published in both Paris and London. His output totaled more than 150 polkas, quadrilles, and waltzes. His most famous composition was Quadrille des Huguenots.

Johann Strauss Sr. requested of Musard that he might play in Musard's orchestra, in order to fully understand the French quadrille. Jacques Offenbach's earliest compositions were written in hopes of being performed by Musard. Musard's orchestra greatly influenced Ureli Corelli Hill when he was seeking a way to properly operate an orchestra.

== Personality ==
In spite of the size of his orchestra, Musard was known to hire the best musicians, and to pay them wages far above the going rate. This was not to his own financial detriment, as Carse states that he had "an almost diabolical mind for business." He had considerable personal charm, and was known for his conversational ability. He relied on his personality, not his physical attractiveness, to hold his audience. In fact, Punch described his appearance more apt for a humble grocer, but as a showman he was highly adept at entertaining.

== Bibliography ==
- Carse, Adam (1951). The Life of Jullien. Cambridge, England: W. Heffer & Sons LTD.
- Cottrell, Stephen (2013). The Saxophone. Yale University Press. ISBN 9780300190953.
- Ellis, Katharine (2007). Music Criticism in Nineteenth-Century France: La Revue Et Gazette Musicale de Paris 1834–80. Cambridge University Press. ISBN 9780521035897.
- Gildea, Robert (2008). Children of the Revolution: The French, 1799–1914. Cambridge, Massachusetts: Harvard University Press. ISBN 9780810874459.
- Goldberg, Bethany S. (2012). "Bernard Ullman and the Business of Orchestras in Mid-Nineteenth-Century New York". In Spitzer, John (ed.). American Orchestras in the Nineteenth Century. Chicago: The University of Chicago Press. ISBN 978-0-226-76976-9.
- Guion, David M. (2010). A History of the Trombone. Rowman & Littlefield. ISBN 978-0-674-03209-5.
- Handley, Rima (1990). A Homeopathic Love Story: The Story of Samuel and Mélanie Hahnemann. Berkeley, California: North Atlantic Books. ISBN 1-55643-049-3.
- Harding, James (1980). Jacques Offenbach – A Biography. New York City: Riverrun Press, Inc. ISBN 0-7145-3835-3.
- Haws, Barbara (2012). "Ureli Corelli Hill: An American Musician's European Travels and the Creation of the New York Philharmonic". In Spitzer, John (ed.). American Orchestras in the Nineteenth Century. Chicago: The University of Chicago Press. ISBN 978-0-226-76976-9.
- Hemmings, F. W. J. (1987). Culture and Society in France 1789 – 1848. London: Bloomsbury Reader. ISBN 978-1-4482-0507-3.
- Jones, Charles Kelley (2006). Francis Johnson (1792–1844): Chronicle of a Black Musician in Early Nineteenth-century Philadelphia. Edinburgh: John Menzies & Co. ISBN 9780934223867.
- Kracauer, Siegfried (2002). Jacques Offenbach and the Paris of His Time. Translated by David, Gwenda; Mosbacher, Eric. New York: Zone Books. ISBN 1-890951-30-7.
- Lawrence, Vera Brodsky (1999). Strong on Music: Repercussions 1857–1862. Vol. 3. Chicago: The University of Chicago Press. ISBN 0-226-47015-6.
- Marr, Robert A. (1889). Francis Johnson (1792–1844): Chronicle of a Black Musician in Early Nineteenth-century Philadelphia Music for the People: A Retrospect of the Glasgow International Exhibition, 1888, with an Account of the Rise of Choral Societies in Scotland. Associated University Presse. ISBN 9780934223867.
- Pollock, Frederick, ed. (1899). The Revised Reports Being a Republication of Such Cases in the English Courts of Common Law and Equity from the Year 1785, as Are Still of Practical Utility: 1834–1836. Vol. 41. London: Sweet and Maxwell, Ltd.
- Potter, Dorothy T.. (2011). 'Food for Apollo': Cultivated Music in Antebellum Philadelphia. Lehigh University Press. ISBN 9781611460032.
- Sadie, Stanley, ed. (2001). The New Grove Dictionary of Music and Musicians. Vol. 17. Grove Dictionaries, Inc. ISBN 0-333-60800-3.
- Scott, Derek B. (2008). Sounds of the Metropolis: The 19th Century Popular Music Revolution in London, New York, Paris and Vienna. Oxford University Press. p. 41. ISBN 9780199718832. "Philippe Musard."
- Slonimsky, Nicolas, ed. (2001). Baker's Biographical Dictionary of Musicians. Vol. 4. Schirmer Books. ISBN 0-02-865529-X.
- Southern, Eileen (1997). The Music of Black Americans: A History. New York: W. W. Norton & Company. ISBN 0-393-03843-2.
- Starkie, Enid (May 1944). "Eccentrics of Eighteen-Thirty – 1". Horizon. IX (53). London.
- Vila, Marie Christine (2007). Paris musique. Parigramme. ISBN 978-2-84096-419-3.
