= Louis-Antoine Jullien =

French conductor and composer (1812–1860)

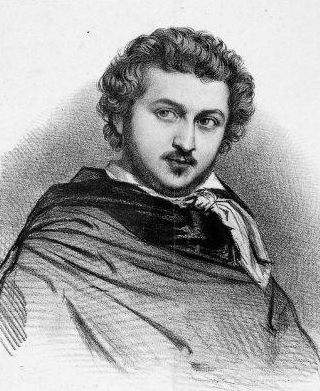
Engraving of Jullien

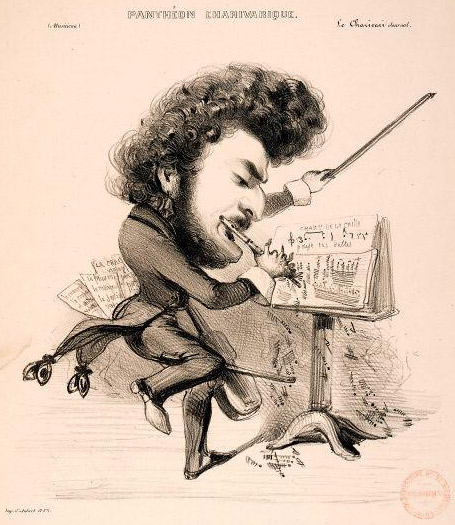
Caricature of Jullien by Benjamin Roubaud

Louis George Maurice Adolphe Roche Albert Abel Antonio Alexandre Noë Jean Lucien Daniel Eugène Joseph-le-brun Joseph-Barême Thomas Thomas Thomas-Thomas Pierre Arbon Pierre-Maurel Barthélemi Artus Alphonse Bertrand Dieudonné Emanuel Josué Vincent Luc Michel Jules-de-la-plane Jules-Bazin Julio César Jullien (né Julien; 23 April 1812 – 14 March 1860), known professionally as Louis-Antoine Jullien, was a French conductor and composer of light music.

== Biography ==
Jullien was born in Sisteron, Alpes-de-Haute-Provence. He was baptised Louis George Maurice Adolphe Roche Albert Abel Antonio Alexandre Noë Jean Lucien Daniel Eugène Joseph-le-brun Joseph-Barême Thomas Thomas Thomas-Thomas Pierre Arbon Pierre-Maurel Barthélemi Artus Alphonse Bertrand Dieudonné Emanuel Josué Vincent Luc Michel Jules-de-la-plane Jules-Bazin Julio César Jullien. His father was Jean-Baptiste Antoine (or Antonio) Jullien, a violinist and merchant. The explanation of his unusual number of names is that when the time came for the baby to be baptised, his father had been invited to play at a concert given by the Sisteron Philharmonic Society, and considered it only polite to ask one of the members of the orchestra to be godfather: but since every member wished to be considered for the privilege, he was christened with the names of all thirty-six members of the society.

He served in the army and studied at the Paris Conservatoire. His fondness for showmanship and the lighter forms of music cost him his position in the school. He lived in Paris between 1826 and 1838, and there conducted the band of the Jardin Turc. But he was compelled to leave to escape his creditors, and came to live in London (1840-1856), where he formed a good orchestra and conducted bands and orchestras at promenade concerts. These had existed in London's pleasure gardens since the mid 18th century, but under the direction of Jullien (and later Sir Arthur Sullivan) indoor proms became a feature of 19th century musical life in London from 1838. The annual series of BBC Proms continuing today had their roots in that movement.

Subsequently he travelled to Netherlands, Scotland, Ireland and America with his orchestra, playing an eclectic mix of light popular music and the classical repertoire. His was an important role in presenting classical music to the public. For many years he was a familiar figure in the world of popular music in England, and his portly form with its elaborate waistcoats occurs very often in the early volumes of Punch.

He brought out an opera, Pietro il grande, at Covent Garden (1852) on a scale of magnificence that ruined him, for the piece was a complete failure, despite the presence of Enrico Tamberlik in the title-role. He was in America until 1854, when he returned to London for a short time; ultimately he went back to Paris, where, in 1859, he was arrested for debt and put into prison.

He died in an asylum at Neuilly-sur-Seine, Hauts-de-Seine, but was still remembered in London twenty years after his death: he was described as "Jullien, the eminent musico" in W. S. Gilbert's libretto for Patience (1881).

== See also ==
- Jean Prosper Guivier
