= Jardin Turc =

Former coffee house in Paris, France

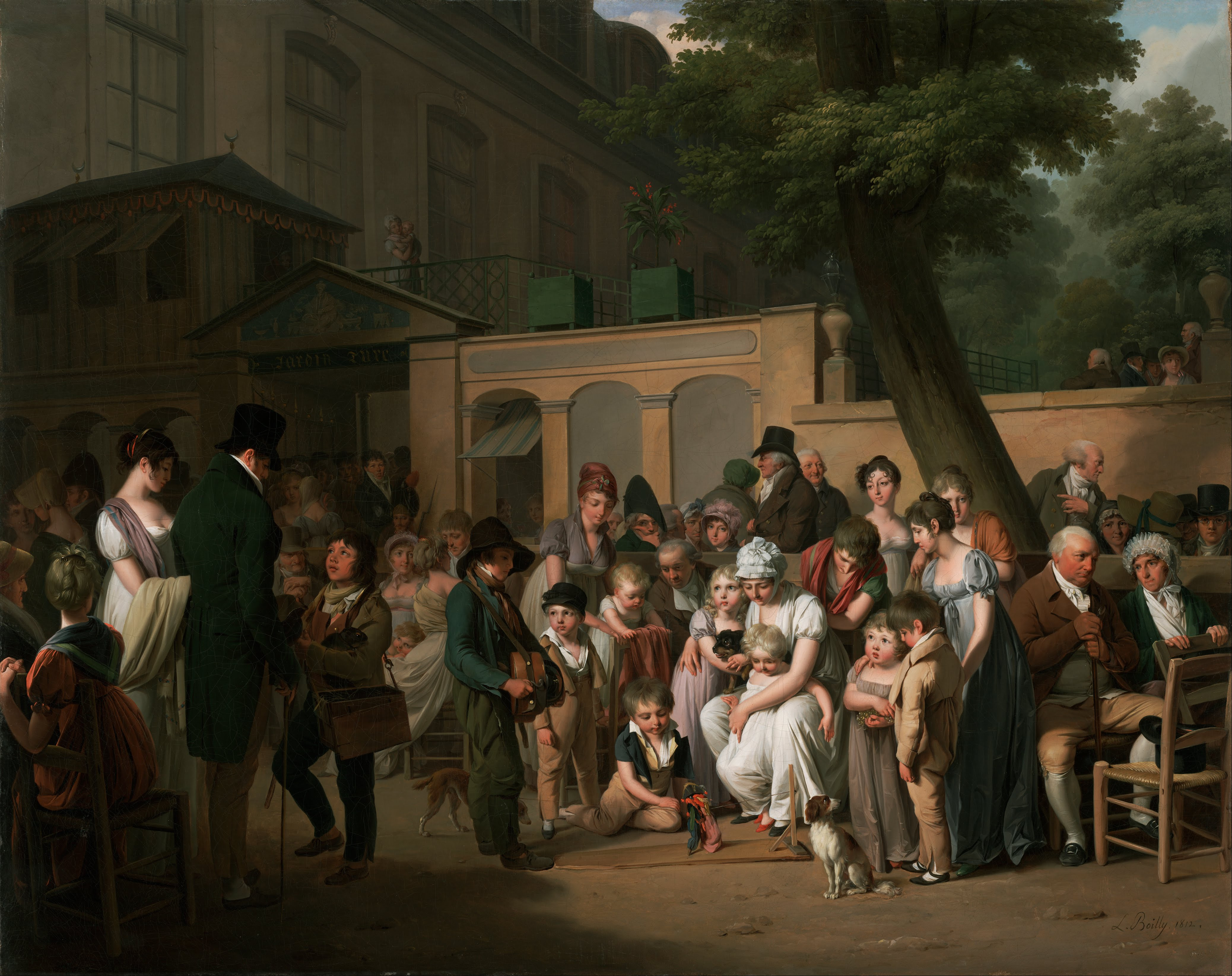
L'entree du Jardin Turc, by Louis-Léopold Boilly, Los Angeles, J. Paul Getty Museum

The Jardin Turc ("Turkish Garden") in the boulevard du Temple, Paris, was a café and music garden that was a popular rendezvous in the city's Marais district from the time of the First French Empire throughout the 19th century. Its decor consisted of kiosks of coloured glass, hanging lanterns and a Chinese bridge, expressing the fad of turqueries, a sub-set of chinoiserie.

== Ambience ==
Octave Uzanne recalled the garden's bourgeois clientele drawn from the world of business, its family groups and dandies promenading in its formal allées and enjoying beer in the cabinets de verdure that were surrounded by well-clipped greenery, which one might reserve for a private party. Alfred de Vigny took his Julia there in May 1838 as their romance blossomed. "The old Jardin Turc is now a restaurant, kept by Bonvallet, and much frequented. To obtain a cabinet, it must be secured days beforehand." Street entertainers were another draw for the Parisian middle classes: "Vaudeville and harlequinades are offered all over the garden," a contemporary journalist remarked. "The refreshments are not particularly good, but the musicians and actors must be paid somehow."

From 1835 to 1838, Louis Antoine Jullien conducted the band that had first been assembled by Auguste Tolbecque at the Jardin Turc during his youth, performing the quadrilles, of eight figures danced by four couples, that were the means by which most Parisians heard the tunes of the latest operas in the 1830s and 1840s in simplified versions; his quadrille based on Les Huguenots was perennially popular.

Étienne de Jouy noted the Jardin Turc in an essay of 1811 as so jammed that it was insufficient to the crowds that besieged it, while nearby the Jardin des Princes offered "all the charms of solitude". He returned to it in an essay "Le Jardin turc", 16 July 1814, noting that it was fashionable to decry it as bourgeois; unaccompanied young couples strolled in its allées and the ébénistes of the faubourg Saint-Antoine enjoyed beers in its pavilion; parties of too-lively soldiers filled a kiosk lit by stained glass, and everywhere the author seemed to find tête-à-têtes and conversations unsuitable for the children who accompanied him, in a mix of company both good and low that made him reflect that good manners belonged to certain families and not to certain districts. Louis-Léopold Boilly painted the crowd at L'entree du Jardin Turc ("The Entrance to the Turkish Garden Cafe") in 1812, and showed the genre piece at the Paris Salon that year.

In Boilly's painting, the café's demure façade offers little in a very recognizable Turkish vein to the boulevard save the device of the crescent moon. Opposite the entrance in boulevard du Temple, General Édouard Mortier was killed, 28 July 1835, by the "infernal machine", a bomb intended for Louis-Philippe, with whom he was riding. The proprietor of the Jardin Turc, Bonvallet, was among the Marais citizens who strenuously objected to Louis Napoleon's coup d'état of 2 December 1851, calling themselves "Montagnards" to recall the heady days of the French First Republic. One harangued the people in the boulevard from a balcony of "citoyen Bonvallet, restaurateur", declaring that president Napoléon had placed himself beyond the law; the police soon appeared, and the radicals beat a hasty retreat. Bonvallet continued the café of the Jardin-Turc into the years before World War I.
