= Musée des Archives Nationales =

Museum in Paris, France

Coordinates: 48°51′35″N 2°21′35″E

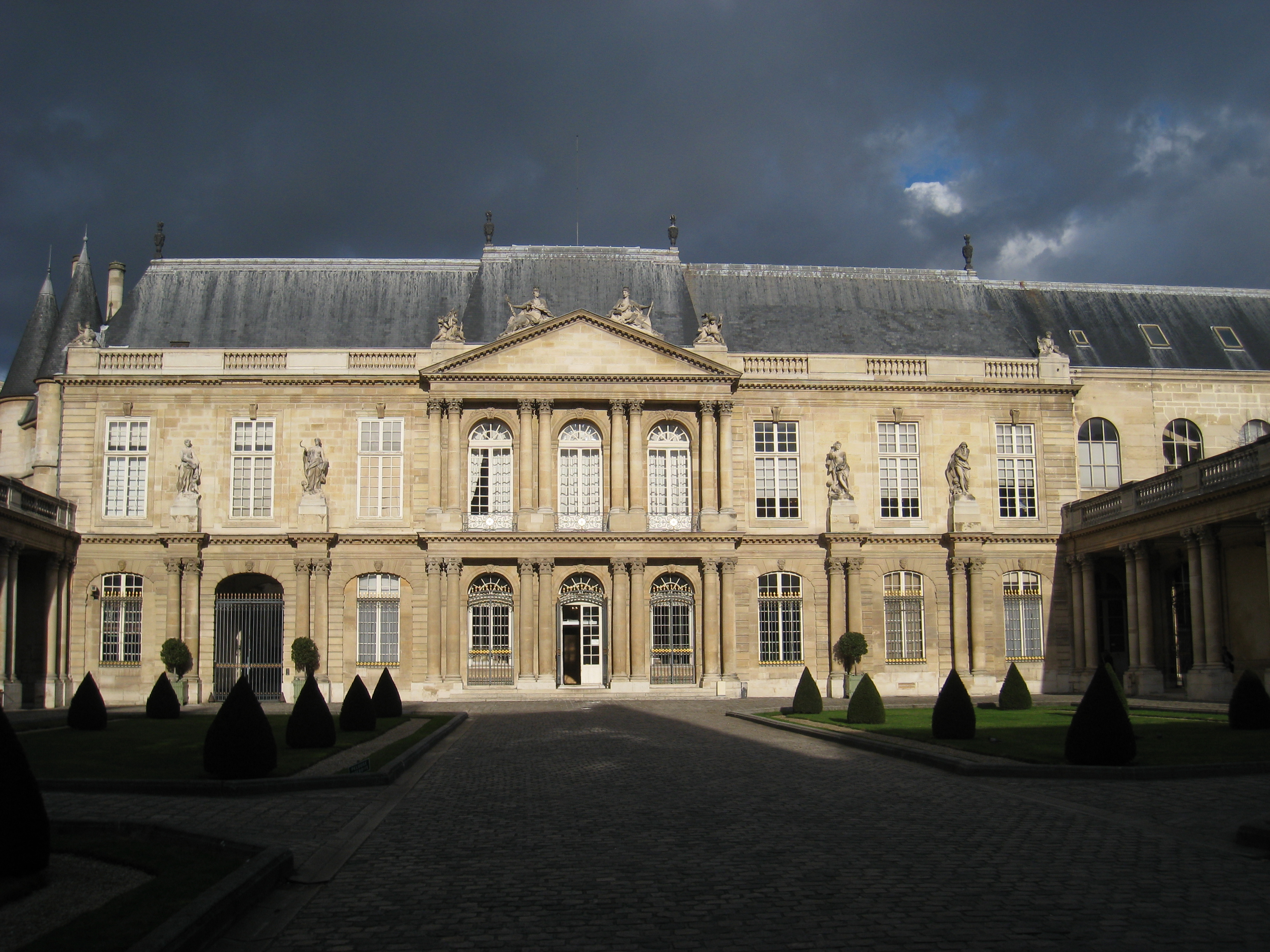
Archives nationales, Hôtel de Soubise

The Musée des Archives Nationales (French pronunciation: [myze dez‿aʁʃiv nɑsjɔnal]), formerly known as the Musée de l'Histoire de France (pronounced [myze d(ə) listwaʁ də fʁɑ̃s]), is a state museum of French history operated by the Archives Nationales. The museum features exhibitions drawn from the collections of the government archives and aims to provide document-based perspective on France’s history and the evolution of French society. It is housed in the Hôtel de Soubise in the Marais neighborhood in the 4th arrondissement of Paris, France. It was first established under Napoleon III in 1867, with the direction of Léon de Laborde.

== History ==
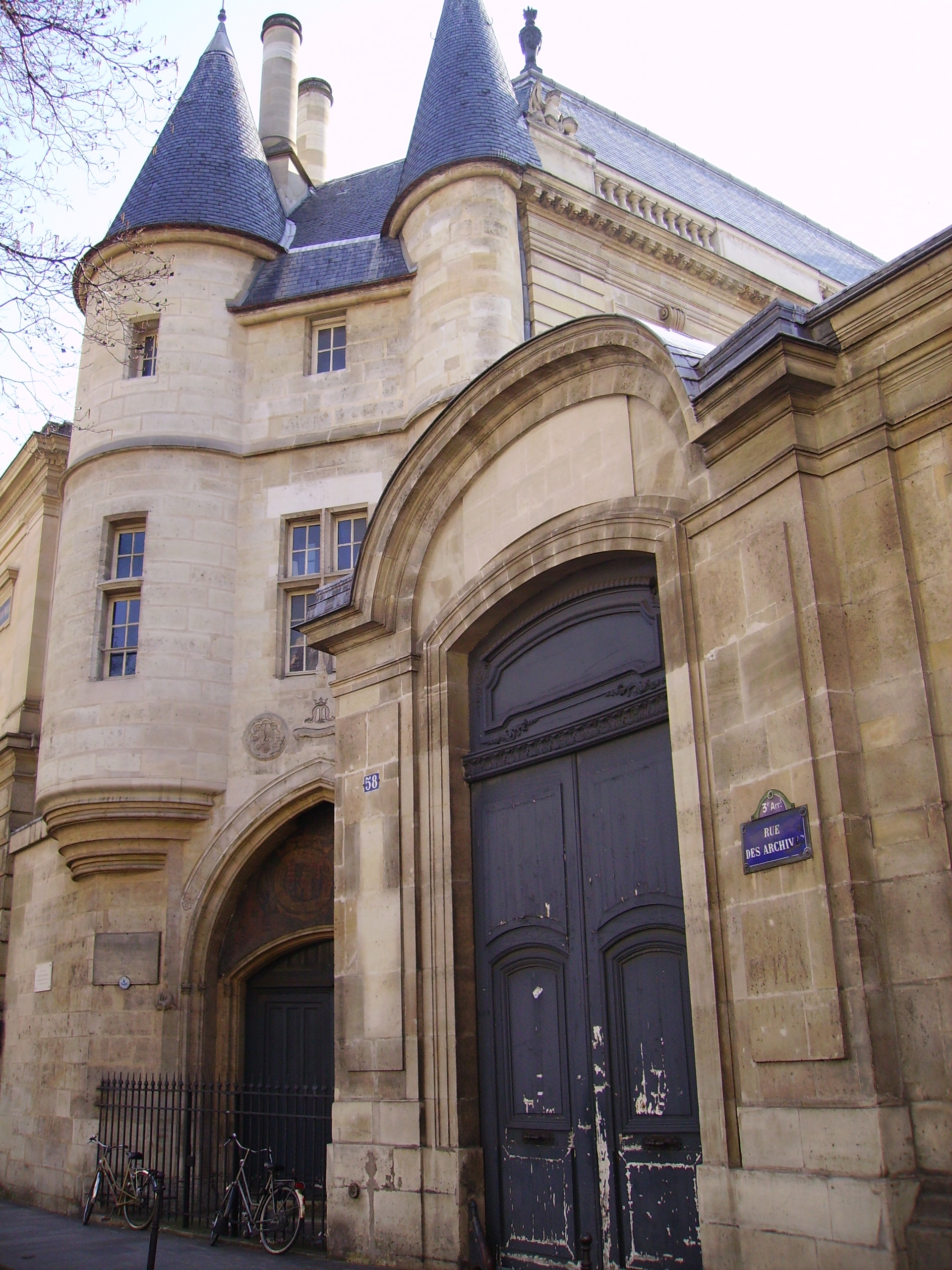
After undergoing centuries of renovation, this turret from the 14th century is the only remaining piece of the Hôtel de Clisson which served as the beginning for the Hôtel de Soubise. It now houses the Musée des Archives Nationales.

The Hôtel de Soubise was first built in 1371 as the Hôtel de Clisson and later acquired by the Ducs de Guise. In 1705, it was rebuilt by architect Pierre-Alexis Delamair (1676–1745) for François de Rohan-Soubise and Anne de Rohan-Chabot, with little remaining of the original structure but its turreted medieval gateway which is now the only surviving remnant of Parisian private architecture from the 14th century (see image). The adjoining Hôtel de Rohan was built at the same time. In 1808, both buildings were acquired by the state, after which Napoleon designated the Hôtel de Soubise for the Empire Archives and the Hôtel de Rohan as the National Printing House (which so remained until 1927).

Léon de Laborde, an archeologist and prolific author documenting artists, museum collections, and French history, served as the General Director of the Empire Archives from March 1857 to April 1868. He was chiefly responsible for setting up the museum relating to the archive collections. The museum officially opened on July 19, 1867, after de Laborde spent years collecting and selecting documents, then developing a classification and numbering system.

== Operations and collections ==
The museum has both a permanent exhibition and rotating special exhibitions, which not only highlight the holdings of the Archives Nationales but also provide history on archival processes. The collection has objects dating back to the first century A.D.

De Laborde developed the classification and numbering system for the collection, most of which are still in use:

- AE I: (the Armoire de fer) This "iron chest" houses many of the most treasured documents, like Napoleon I's testament, the Journal of Louis XVI and French constitutions.
- AE II: Museum of French documents, including one of the oldest documents held in the Archives, a parchment from King Childebert III granting land to the Abbey of Saint-Denis (see image).
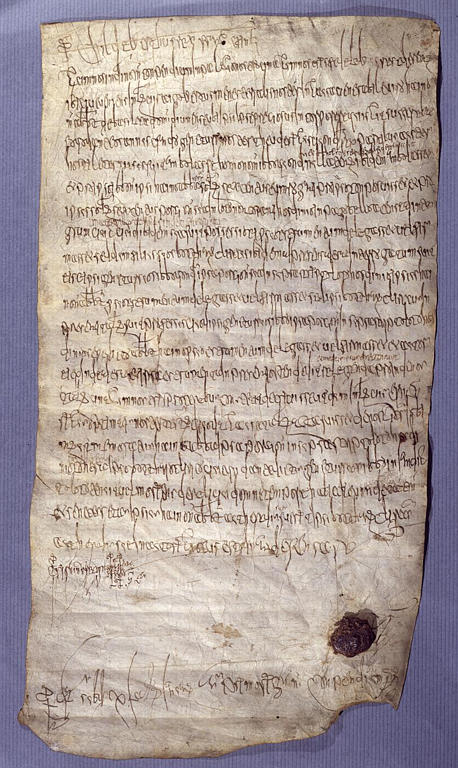
  One of the oldest records in the Archives nationales: parchment dated December 23, 695. King Childebert III rules that the land of Hodenc-l'Évêque (Oise) belongs to the Abbey of Saint-Denis.
- AE III: Museum of foreign documents. This includes items such as correspondence between Kings Henry III of England and Louis IX of France (see image).
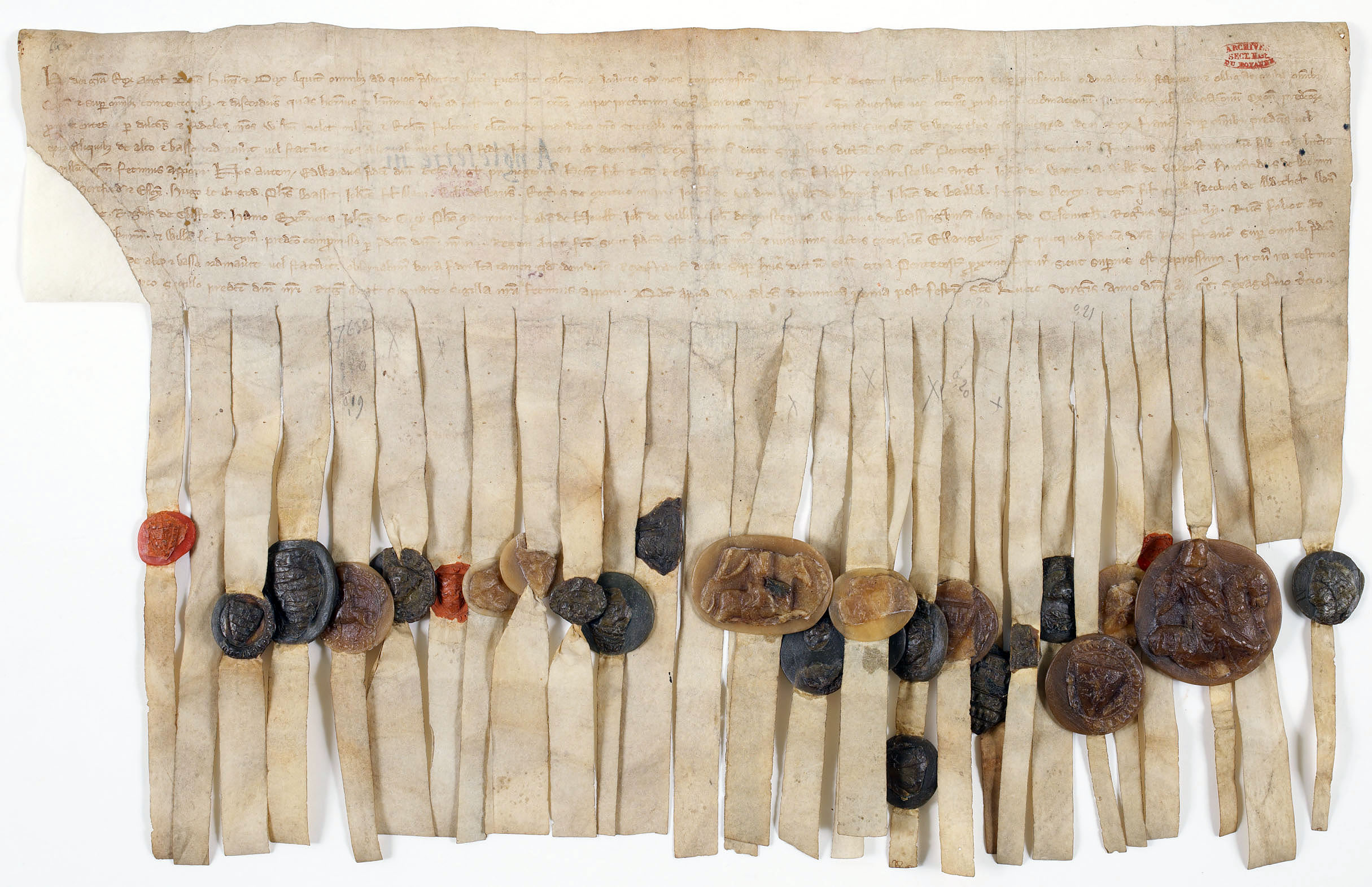
  A letter from King Henry III of England to King Louis IX of France dated 16 October 1263.
- AE V: Incriminating evidence and seized items, including case documents like that against Robert-François Damiens for his assassination attempt of King Louis XV.
- AE VI: Historic objects, such as ancient city keys and objects from the Hôtel de Soubise and Hôtel de Rohan from when they were residences.

AE IV, which was used for Sigillographic collections, no longer exists as it was eventually built into its own separate collection outside the Museum.

== Architecture and decor ==
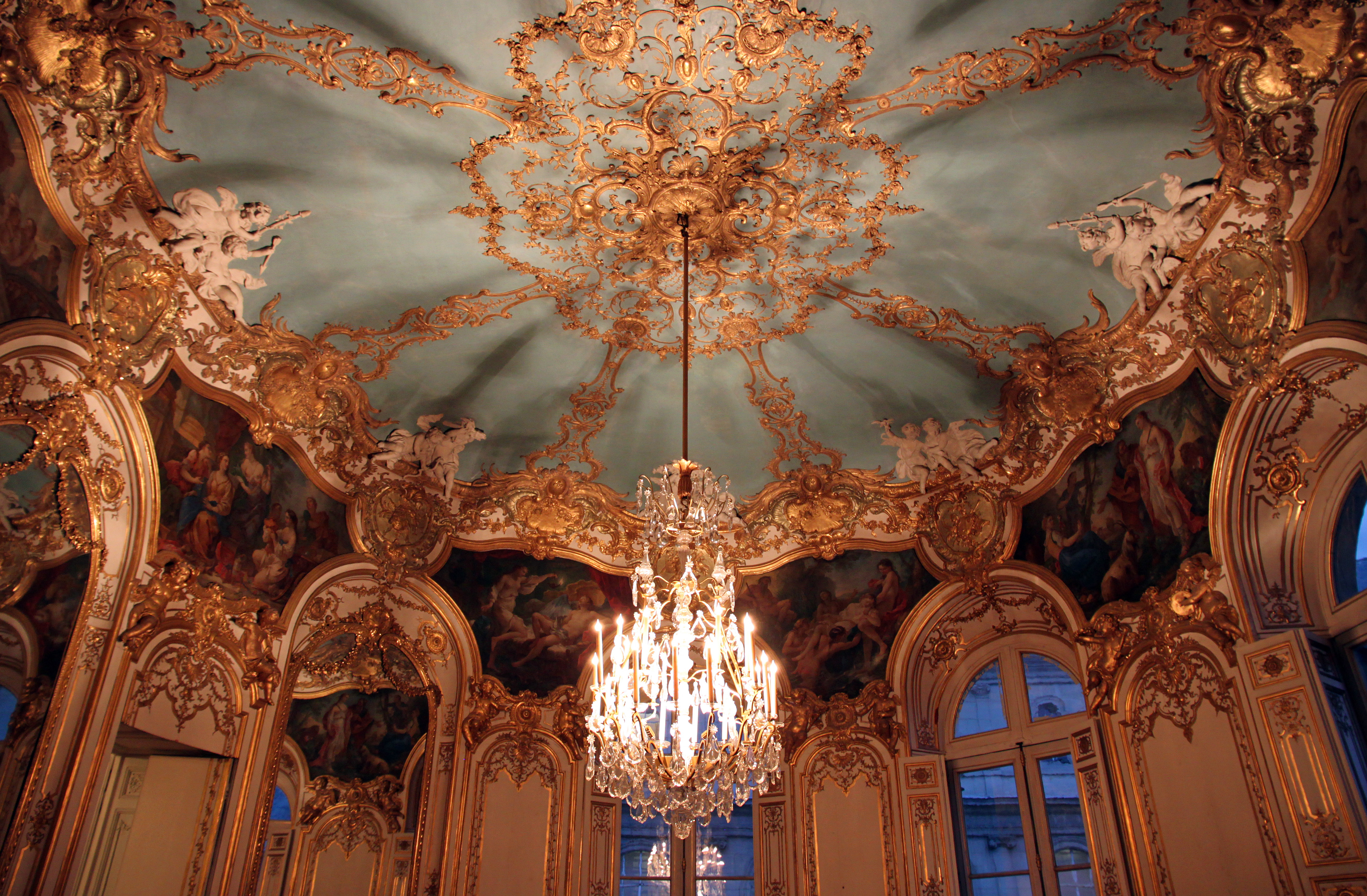
An image of the Salon ovale de la princesse in the Hôtel de Soubise.

The Hôtels de Soubise and de Rohan have exterior architecture in the Baroque style, with rooms throughout in the Rococo style, including the Chambre du prince, Salon ovale du prince, Chambre d'apparat de la princesse, an amusing Cabinet des singes (Monkey Cabinet), and the fine Salon ovale de la princesse with featuring gilt and crystal decor and ceiling frescoes by François Boucher, Charles-Joseph Natoire, and Carle Van Loo (see image). Many of the rooms were carefully restored in the early 1900s.

== See also ==
- Hôtel de Soubise
- List of museums in Paris

== Bibliography ==
- Senator Catherine Dumas, La maison de l'Histoire de France : Rendez-vous avec l'Histoire
- Isabelle Backouche, Vincent Duclert, Quel musée d'histoire pour la France ?, Paris, Armand Colin, 2011.
