= Machine gun =

Fully automatic firearm

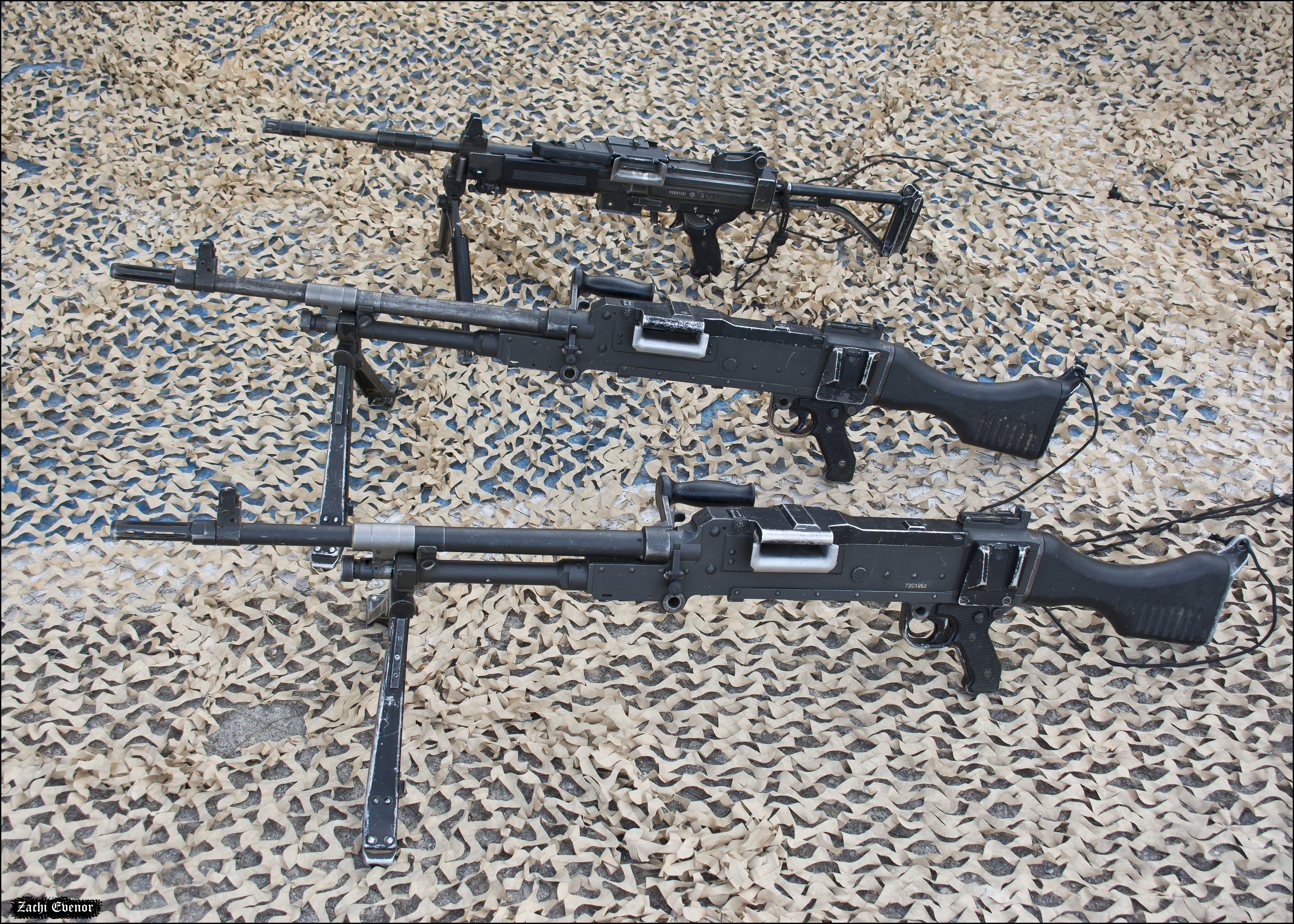
Top: IWI Negev Bottom: FN MAG (general purpose machine gun)

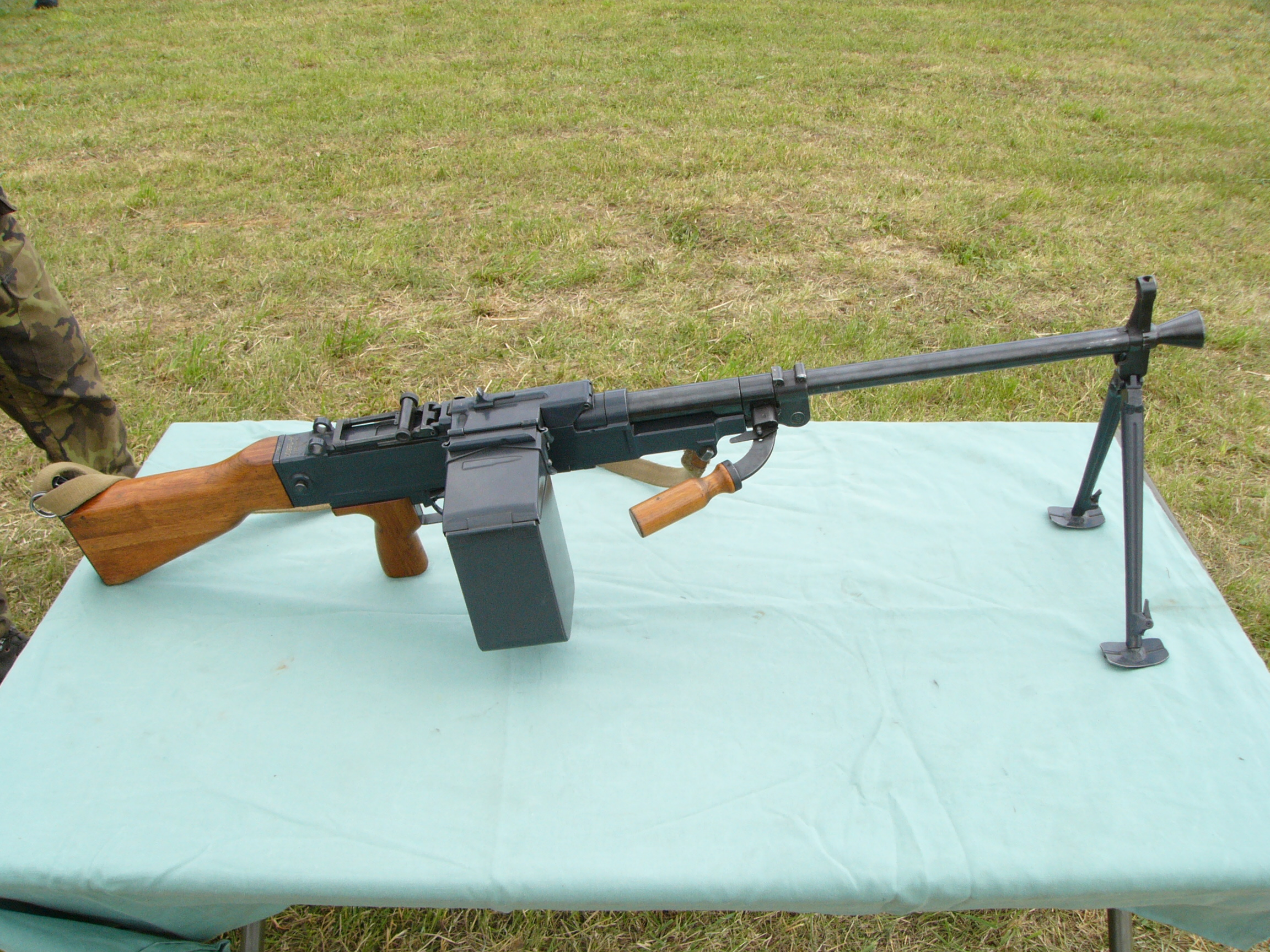
Czechoslovak 7.62 mm Universal Machine gun Model 1959

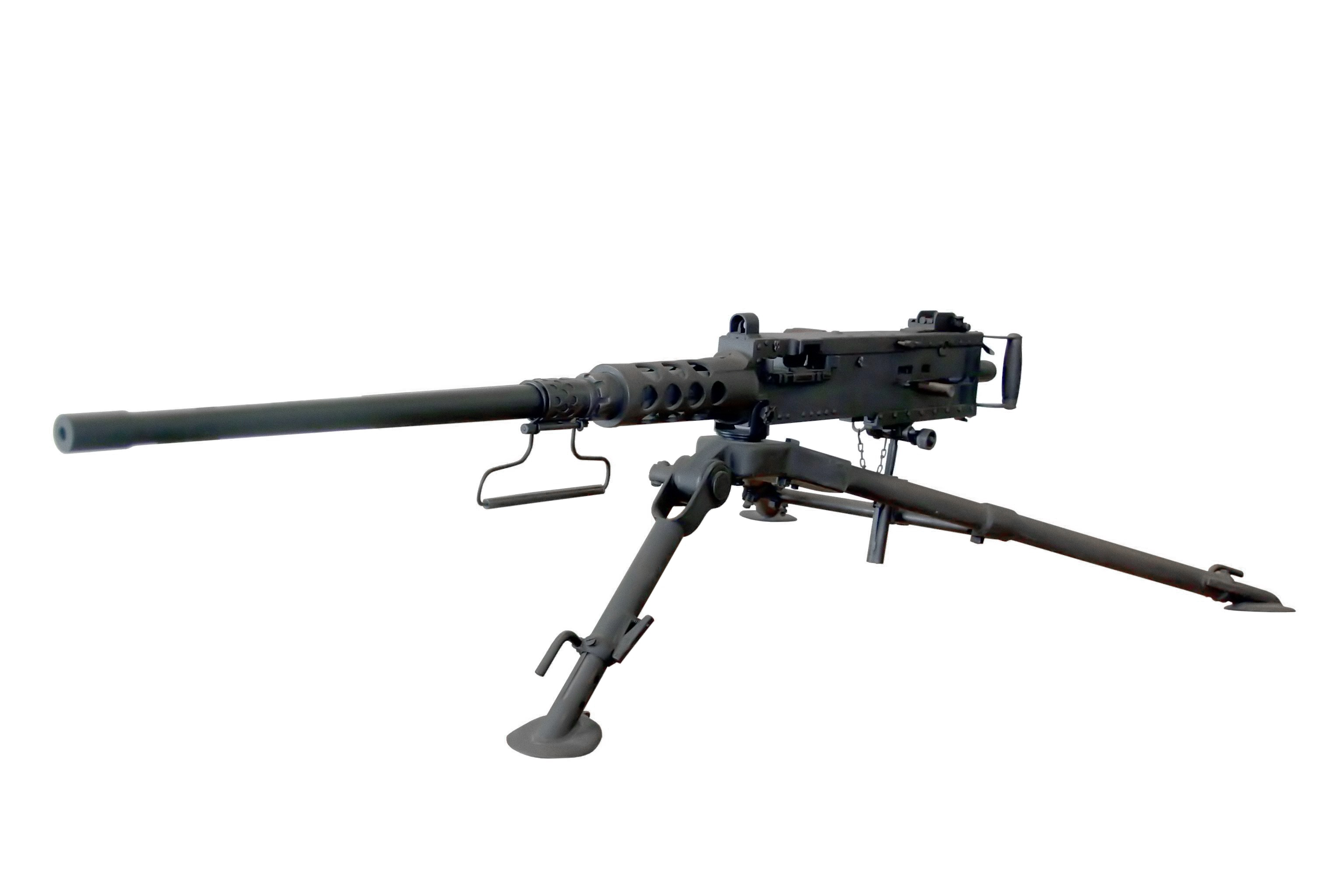
A .50 caliber M2 machine gun: John Browning's design has been one of the longest-serving and most successful machine gun designs

A machine gun (MG) is a fully automatic and rifled firearm designed for sustained direct fire. Automatic firearms of 20 mm (0.79 in) caliber or more are usually classified as autocannons rather than machine guns.

As a class of military kinetic projectile weapons, machine guns are designed to be mainly used as infantry support weapons and generally used when attached to a bipod or tripod, a fixed mount or a heavy weapons platform for stability against recoil. Many machine guns also use belt feeding and open bolt operation, features not normally found on other infantry firearms.

== Modern overview ==
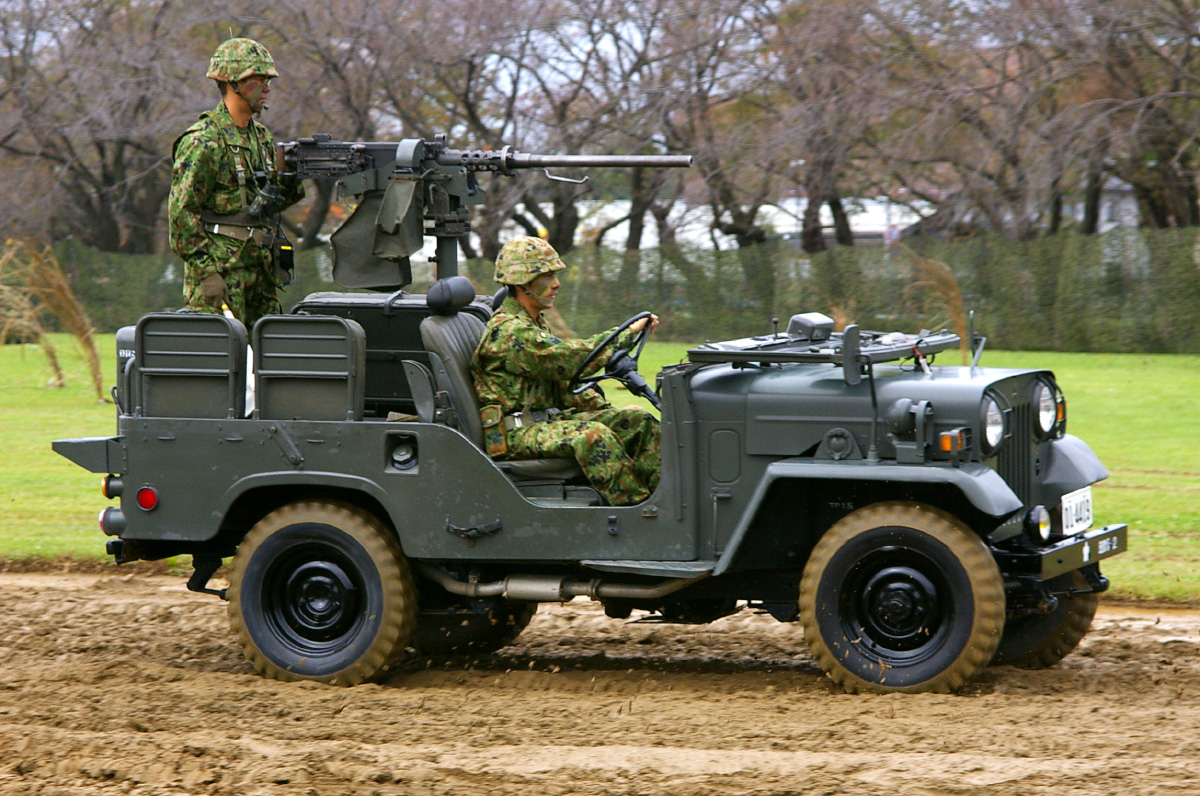
A vehicle with a Sumitomo M2 heavy machine gun mounted at the rear

Unlike semi-automatic firearms, which require one trigger pull per round fired, a machine gun is designed to continue firing for as long as the trigger is held down. In a military context, the term is used to refer to relatively heavy crew-served weapons, able to provide continuous or frequent bursts of automatic fire for as long as ammunition can be fed. In non-military contexts, it is broadly used to refer to fully automatic weapons generally, regardless of caliber or form factor. While technical use of the term "machine gun" has varied, the modern definition used by the Sporting Arms and Ammunition Manufacturers' Institute of America is "a fully automatic firearm that loads, fires and ejects continuously when the trigger is held to the rear until the ammunition is exhausted or pressure on the trigger is released". This definition excludes most early manually operated repeating arms the Gatling gun and such as volley guns like the Nordenfelt gun.

Machine guns are used against infantry, low-flying aircraft, small boats and lightly/unarmored land vehicles, and can provide suppressive fire (either directly or indirectly) or enforce area denial over a sector of land with grazing fire. They are commonly mounted on fast attack vehicles such as technicals to provide heavy mobile firepower, armored vehicles such as tanks for engaging targets too small to justify the use of the primary weaponry or too fast to effectively engage with it, and on aircraft as defensive armament or for strafing ground targets, though on fighter aircraft true machine guns have mostly been supplanted by large-caliber rotary guns.

Although subdivided into "light", "medium", "heavy" or "general-purpose", even the lightest dedicated machine guns tend to be substantially larger and heavier than standard infantry arms. Heavy machine guns are either mounted on a tripod or on a vehicle; when carried on foot, the machine gun and associated equipment (tripod, ammunition, spare barrels) require additional crew members.

The term heavy machine gun originated in World War I to describe heavyweight medium machine guns, and persisted into World War II with Japanese Hotchkiss M1914 clones; today, however, it is used to refer to automatic weapons with a caliber of at least 12.7 mm (0.5 in), but less than 20 mm (0.8 in).

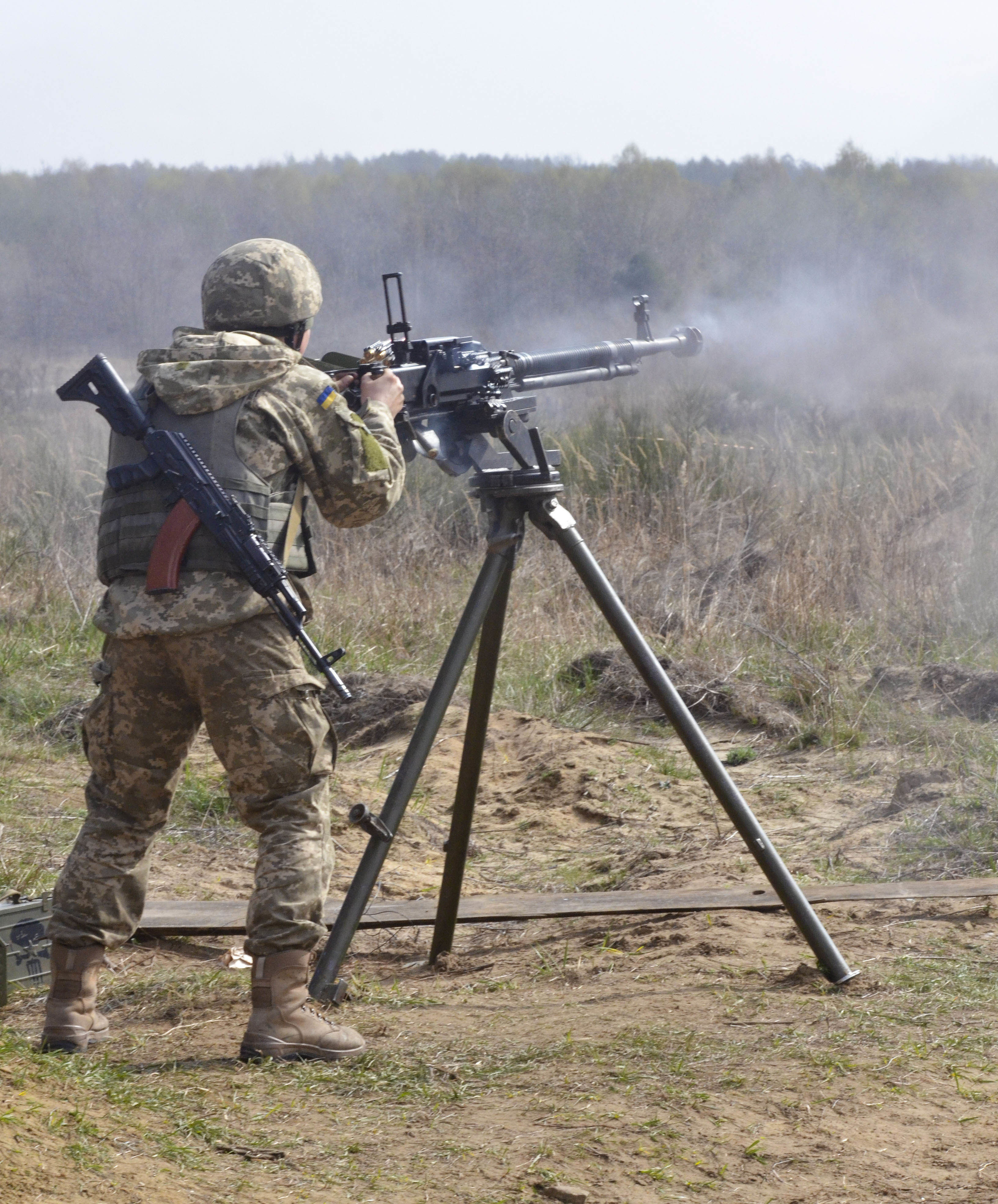
DShK in the heavy role

Many heavy machine guns, such as the Browning M2 .50 BMG machine gun, are accurate enough to engage targets at great distances. During the Vietnam War, Carlos Hathcock set the record for a long-distance shot at 7,382 ft (2,250 m) with a .50 caliber heavy machine gun he had equipped with a telescopic sight. This led to the introduction of .50 caliber anti-materiel sniper rifles, such as the Barrett M82.

== History ==
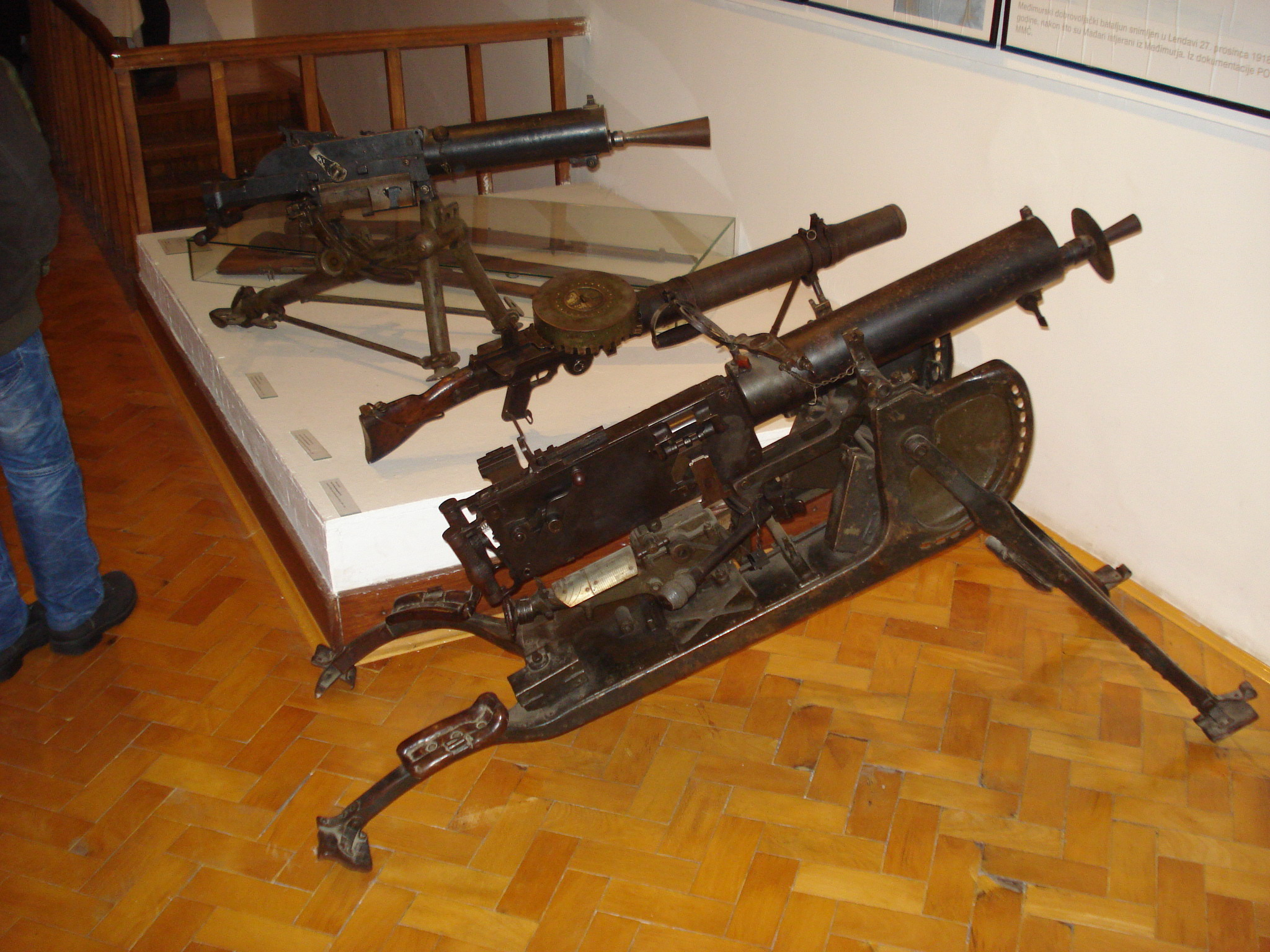
Collection of old machine guns in the Međimurje County Museum (Čakovec, Croatia). From rear to front: Austro-Hungarian Schwarzlose M7/12, British Lewis, German MG 08.

The first successful machine-gun designs were developed in the mid-19th century. The key characteristic of modern machine guns, their relatively high rate of fire and more importantly mechanical loading, first appeared in the Model 1862 Gatling gun, which was adopted by the United States Navy. These weapons were still powered by hand; however, this changed with Hiram Maxim's idea of harnessing recoil energy to power reloading in his Maxim machine gun. Dr. Gatling also experimented with electric-motor-powered models; as discussed above, this externally powered machine reloading has seen use in modern weapons as well.

=== Medieval ===
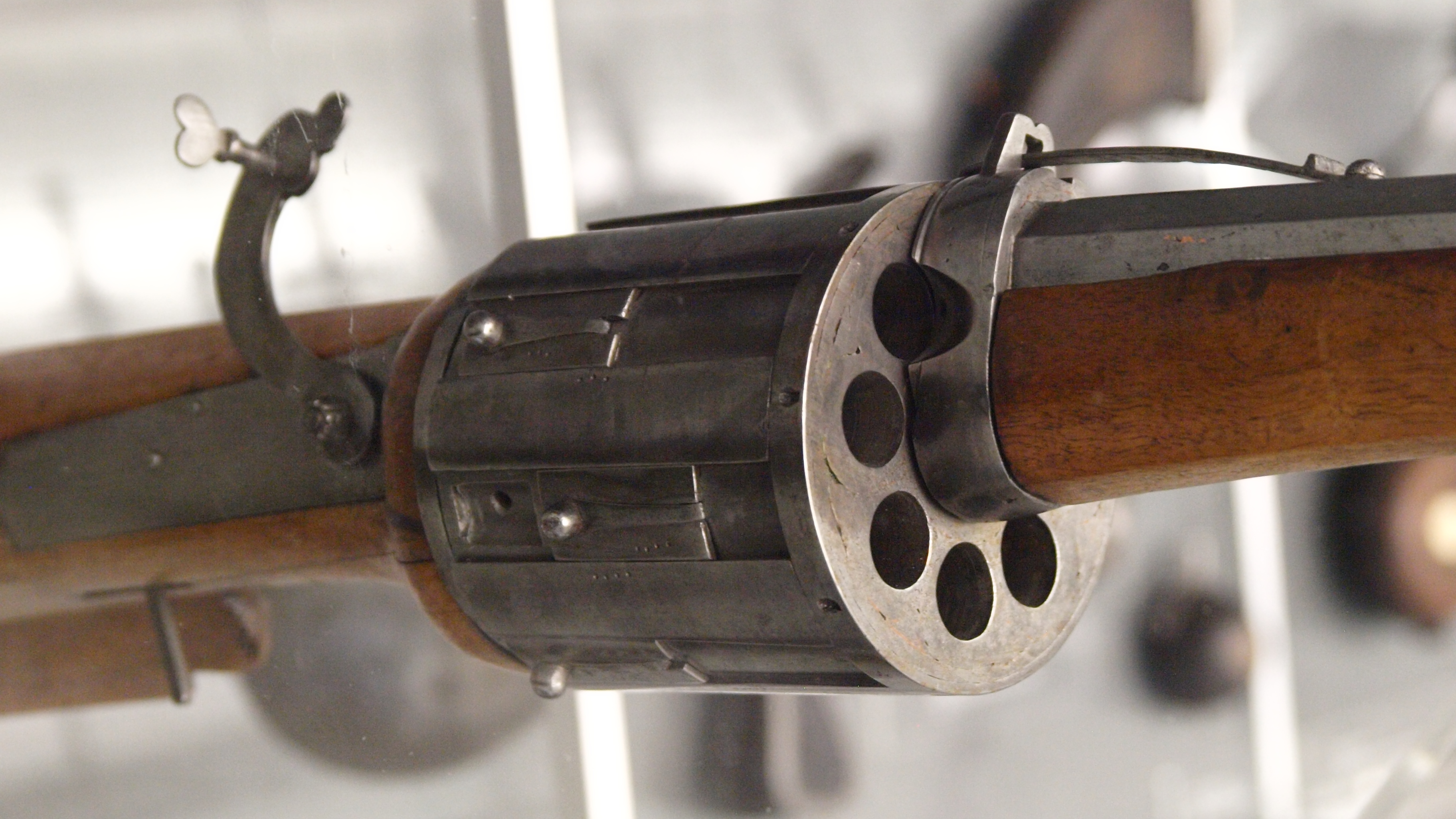
Detail of an 8-chambered matchlock revolver (Germany c. 1580)

The first known ancestors of multi-shot weapons were medieval organ guns. An early example of an attempt at the mechanisation of one of these would be an 'engine of war' produced in the mid-1570s in England capable of firing from 160 to 320 shots 4, 8, 12 or 24 bullets at a time at a rate of fire up to roughly 3 times the rate of fire of the typical arquebusier of the day. It was also claimed that the gun could be reloaded 'as often as you like' and fired no matter the weather though the English government never adopted the weapon despite testing being carried out at the Tower of London. The first firearms to have the ability to fire multiple shots from a single barrel without a full manual reload were revolvers made in Europe in the late 1500s. One is a shoulder-gun-length weapon made in Nuremberg, Germany, circa 1580. Another is a revolving arquebus, produced by Hans Stopler of Nuremberg in 1597.

=== 17th century ===
True repeating long arms were difficult to manufacture prior to the development of the unitary firearm cartridge; nevertheless, lever-action repeating rifles such as the Kalthoff repeater and Cookson repeater were made in small quantities in the 17th century.

Perhaps the earliest examples of predecessors to the modern machine gun are to be found in East Asia. According to the Wu-Pei-Chih, a booklet examining Chinese military equipment produced during the first quarter of the 17th century, the Chinese army had in its arsenal the 'Po-Tzu Lien-Chu-P'ao' or 'string-of-100-bullets cannon'. This was a repeating cannon fed by a hopper containing balls which fired its charges sequentially. The way it worked was similar to the Perkins steam gun of 1824 or the Beningfield electrolysis gun of 1845 only slow-burning gunpowder was used as the propelling force in place of steam or the gases produced by electrolysis. Another repeating gun was produced by a Chinese commoner, Dai Zi, in the late 17th century. This weapon was also hopper-fed and never went into mass production.

In 1655, a way of loading, aiming and shooting up to 6 wall muskets 60 times in a minute for a total rate of fire of 360 shots per minute was mentioned in The Century of Inventions by Edward Somerset, 2nd Marquess of Worcester, though, like all the inventions mentioned in the book, it is uncertain if it was ever built.

It is sometimes claimed (i.e. in George Morgan Chinn's the Machine Gun) that in 1663 the first mention of the automatic principle of machine guns was in a paper presented to the Royal Society of England by Palmer, an Englishman who described a volley gun capable of being operated by either recoil or gas. However, no one has been able to find this paper in recent times and all references to a multi-shot weapon by a Palmer during this period appear to be referring to a somewhat more common Kalthoff repeater or Lorenzoni-system gun. Despite this, there is a reference in 1663 to at least the concept of a genuine automatic gun that was presented to Prince Rupert, though its type and method of operation are unknown.

=== 18th century ===
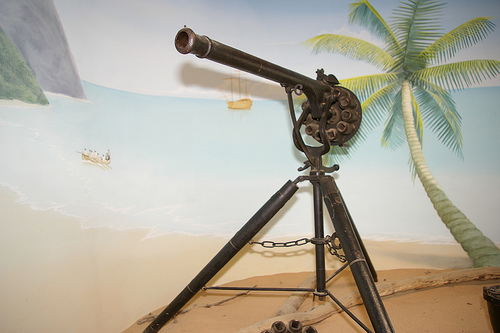
Replica Puckle Gun from Bucklers Hard Maritime Museum

The 18th century saw a continuing stream of multi-shot and rapid-fire ordnance proposals across France, England, and the German states, most of them crank- or hand-operated cannon firing at rates that, however exaggerated in the reporting, far outpaced the conventional artillery of the day. In 1708 it was reported from Constantinople that a French officer had invented a very light single-barreled cannon capable of firing 30 shots in two and a half minutes, a rate of 12 a minute, and in 1711 a French lawyer named Barbuot presented to the parliament of Dijon a crank-operated "war machine" of ten carbine barrels loaded from a "drum" and firing in volleys. It was claimed to be accurate at 400 to 500 paces, to strike with enough force to pierce two or three men at close range, to fire five or six times before infantry came within musket range or cavalry within pistol range, and to be nearly as manoeuvrable as cavalry; a heavier version was said to throw grenades, and it was proposed to fit the machine with a bellows for clearing the smoke of firing.

The best-documented design of the era was that of James Puckle, a London lawyer who patented "The Puckle Gun" on 15 May 1718. A manually operated 1.25 in. (32 mm) caliber flintlock cannon with a revolver cylinder firing six to eleven rounds before the cylinder was swapped out, it was intended for shipboard use. It was among the earliest weapons to be called a machine gun, being described as such in 1722, though its operation does not match the modern sense of the term; Puckle claimed it could fire round bullets at Christians and square bullets at Turks. It was nonetheless a commercial failure, never adopted or produced in meaningful quantity.

French and other Continental inventors remained especially active. Philippe Vayringe demonstrated a small cannon firing 16 shots in succession before the Duke of Lorraine in 1720, and a French report of 1729 described a machine able to fire 600 balls in a few minutes. In 1737 it was reported that Jacob de Weinholtz, a Dane serving in the Portuguese army, had invented a cannon firing 20 to 30 shots a minute but requiring fifteen men to work it; examples were taken with a Portuguese fleet sent to India for a colonial war in the 1740s. The same year a German engineer was said to have built a 10-pounder firing 20 times a minute, and in 1740 the Frenchman Chevalier de Benac developed a cannon firing 11 times a minute.

Britain and Denmark produced comparable designs around mid-century. In 1747 James Allis presented to the Royal Society a cannon said to charge and discharge itself 20 times a minute, and in 1750 a Prussian known as Captain Steuben of the Train of Artillery demonstrated to the King of Denmark a breech-loading cannon worked by four men, fed by paper cartridges, and firing 24 times a minute. In his satire, The Chinese Spy, Ange Goudar writes that the fictional Chinese mandarin Cham-pi-pi assisted in proofing a "great gun" capable of 60 shots a minute in Paris, 1764. In 1773 Thomas Desaguliers invented a cannon firing 23 or 24 times a minute that cleaned itself after every shot, and in 1775 two large cannons built by an unidentified matross at Woolwich were reported to have fired 59 shots in 59 and a half seconds.

The later decades brought a series of multi-barrel volley designs anticipating the mitrailleuse. Also in 1775, the Frenchman Du Perron invented a breech-loading volley gun worked by three or four men, its 24 barrels discharging ten times a minute for 240 shots, and in 1776 an inventor from Westmoreland in England produced a gun said to charge and discharge itself 120 times a minute "by the motion of one hand only". In 1777 the Philadelphia gunsmith Joseph Belton offered the Continental Congress a "new improved gun" able to fire up to twenty shots in five seconds; rather than the complex lever-action mechanisms of older repeaters, it used a simpler system of superposed loads loaded with a single large paper cartridge. Congress asked Belton to modify 100 flintlock muskets to fire eight shots in this manner but rescinded the order when his price proved too high. Two years later, in 1779, the British inventor William Wilson Wright produced a machine of 21 musket barrels worked by three men that he claimed could fire three times faster than a single man could load and fire a musket.

The final years of the century, against the backdrop of the French Revolution, yielded several more ambitious multi-barrel "pyroballistic" machines. In 1788 a Swiss soldier invented a machine worked by ten men that discharged 300 balls in three minutes, while the same year a Prussian officer was reported to have built a gun firing 400 balls one after the other. In 1790 a former French officer, Joseph-François-Louis Grobert, invented a multi-barreled "ballistic" or "pyroballistic machine" worked by four men through a continuous rotational movement, firing 360 rifle shots a minute in a variety of calibres. Finally, in 1792 the French artist Renard invented a piece of ordnance worked by one man that fired 90 shots a minute, and a French mechanic named Garnier likewise built a one-man musket battery of 15 barrels firing 300 shots in two minutes—150 a minute, or ten per barrel.

=== 19th century ===
Before truly automatic weapons emerged, inventors across Europe and America spent decades experimenting with rapid-fire mechanisms. Early approaches relied on sheer mechanical duplication: volley guns like the Mitrailleuse and double-barreled pistols simply multiplied every component, while the Nock gun exploited the otherwise-undesirable "chain fire" phenomenon (where multiple chambers are ignited at once) to propagate a spark from a single flintlock mechanism to multiple barrels. Pepperbox pistols eliminated the need for multiple hammers by using manually operated barrels, and revolvers refined this further by pre-loading a cylinder and linking its advancement to the cocking of the hammer. All of these, however, remained manually operated.

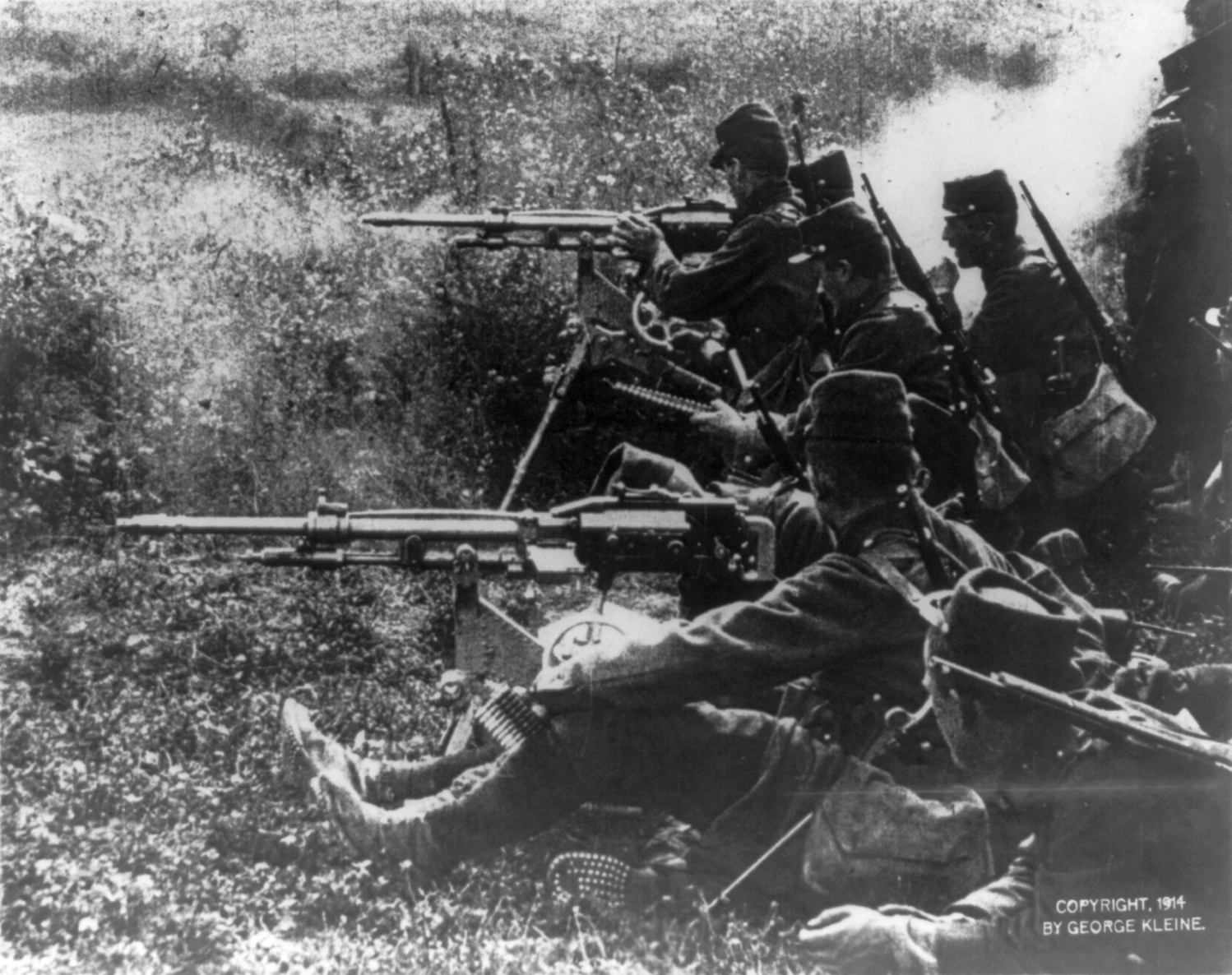
A detachment of French infantry with 2 Saint-Etienne Model 1907 machine guns (c. b1914)

The early 19th century saw a proliferation of inventors proposing self-loading or rapid-fire cannon designs of varying ambition and credibility. In 1805, a British inventor from Northampton designed a cannon claimed to prime, load and fire itself ten times a minute, and the following year a Viennese copper engraver and mechanic known as Mr Putz demonstrated a machine cannon capable in theory of firing up to sixty times a minute, though the rate of fire was limited by overheating of the barrel. An American inventor from Baltimore went further still in 1819 with an eleven-barreled gun firing twelve times a minute for a total of 132 shots, while in 1821 the French-American "Fire King" Ivan Ivanitz Chabert demonstrated a muzzle-loading repeating cannon in England that fired five shots per minute, worked by a "wheel" fed by paper cartridges from an attached store and ignited using a match from a match-holder elsewhere on the cannon.

These years produced a steady stream of further proposals, some more credible than others. An 1825 Italian geographical compendium noted the existence in France of "mechanical rifles" used to defend warehouses and capable of firing 120 shots without reloading, and in 1828 a native of Ireland invented a swivel gun requiring no cleaning or muzzle-loading, said to be buildable to any dimensions, usable as an ordinary cannon at a moment's notice, and capable of forty shots a minute. Also in 1828, a Frenchman named Lesire-Fruyer invented a revolver cannon firing twelve shots a minute and worked by two artillerymen, later put on display at the French Museum of the Marine in 1854. In 1831 a mechanic from the Vosges department produced a lever-operated cannon rated at 100 shots a minute, and the following year another French mechanic, Hamel, devised a machine capable of firing 500 rifle shots a minute.

During the same decade the Swiss inventor John Steuble developed a breech-loading machine gun fed by cartridges from a hopper, reportedly capable of firing between 136 and 204 shots a minute from 34 one-inch-calibre barrels. His attempts to sell it led to a protracted international misadventure: the English government showed interest but refused to pay him and was later sued, the Russian government tried to imprison him, and the French government acknowledged the weapon was mechanically sound but declined it as lacking novelty and unusable by the army.

The 1840s brought several notable designs. A Detroit-based inventor was reportedly working in 1839 on a cannon that could fire fifty to sixty times a minute, and in 1842 an American named Dr. Thomson or Thompson invented a four-barreled cannon fed by pre-loaded breech-pieces and operated by a revolving cylinder, said to fire fifty times in as many seconds—up to 500 times in 500 seconds. In 1846, the American Francis Dixon patented a self-loading, self-priming cannon firing thirty to forty shots a minute, with a variant worked by clockwork-like machinery that could move a set distance along rails, fire ten times, and return to its original position. That same year in Canada, Simeon "Larochelle" Gautron refined a repeating cannon he had first modeled in wood in 1836: crank-operated and workable by one man where a conventional cannon needed twelve or more, it was fed by paper cartridges from a revolving cylinder and used separate percussion caps for ignition, firing ten or twelve times a minute (with one English newspaper claiming up to sixty) and cleaning itself after every shot. The Canadian military rejected it on grounds of complexity and expense—drawing criticism from the French-language press—and Gautron abandoned development for more profitable pursuits; a model remains on display at the Musée National des Beaux-Arts du Québec.

American inventors increasingly formalized their ideas through publications and patents. In 1847, J.R. Nichols published a description in Scientific American of a small electrically ignited prototype that rotated a series of barrels vertically, feeding at the top from a tube or hopper and capable, per the author, of firing immediately at any elevation after receiving a charge. The following year the Italian Cesare Rosaglio announced a single-operator machine gun firing 300 rifle shots a minute, or 12,000 in an hour once reloading of the ammunition "tanks" was accounted for. In June 1851 the British inventor Francis McGetrick demonstrated a "war engine" allegedly able to fire 10,000 ball cartridges in ten minutes, and in 1852 Delany, an Irish immigrant to America, demonstrated a rotary cannon using a unique form of wheellock ignition.

Patent activity accelerated through the 1850s. In 1854 Henry Clarke filed a British patent for a multi-barreled weapon whose barrels, arranged side by side, were fed by a revolving cylinder similar to a turret revolver's and supplied in turn by hoppers, in the manner of Nichols's design; it could be fired by percussion or electricity, the percussion version using separate caps with breeches holding either loose powder and balls or paper cartridges. A model said to fire 1,800 shots a minute with great precision at 2,000 yards and drawn by two horses was built and tested, though apparently never adopted militarily. The same year, Henry Bessemer proposed water cooling and a water cleaning system for machine guns; his patent described a hydropneumatic delayed-blowback-operated, fully automatic cannon (and, in part, a steam-operated piston for firearms), though he later abandoned the design. American patents followed from John Andrus Reynolds in 1855 and from C. E. Barnes in 1856, the latter a manually operated weapon with a blowback-operated cocking mechanism, while in France and Britain the Frenchman Francois Julien patented a cannon in 1856 that fed from an open-ended tubular magazine using rollers and an endless chain in place of springs.

Two American weapons of the Civil War era marked a genuine step toward practicality. The Agar Gun, nicknamed the "coffee-mill gun" for its resemblance to a coffee mill, was invented by Wilson Agar at the start of the American Civil War. It used mechanized loading via a hand crank linked to a hopper above the single barrel, the same crank also firing the weapon; paper cartridges fitted with percussion caps were inserted into metal tubes that acted as chambers, making it functionally similar to a revolver. Demonstrated to President Lincoln in 1861, it so impressed him that he bought ten on the spot at US$1,500 (equivalent to $53,750 in 2025) apiece, and the Union Army eventually purchased seventy—though, like its more famous counterpart the Gatling Gun, the antiquated views of the Ordnance Department confined it to limited use. The Gatling gun, patented in 1861 by Richard Jordan Gatling, was the first to offer controlled, sequential fire with mechanical loading, its key features being the machine loading of prepared cartridges and a hand-operated crank for high-speed sequential firing. After very limited action in the American Civil War, it was improved and used in the Franco-Prussian war and North-West Rebellion, with many sold to other armies into the early 20th century until they were gradually supplanted by Maxim guns.

These early multi-barrel guns were approximately the size and weight of contemporary artillery pieces and were often perceived as a replacement for cannon firing grapeshot or canister shot. The large wheels needed to move them required a high firing position, increasing crew vulnerability, and sustained firing of gunpowder cartridges generated a cloud of smoke that made concealment impossible until smokeless powder became available late in the century. Gatling guns were targeted by artillery they could not reach and their crews by snipers they could not see; such threats mattered far less in expanding European colonial empires, where the weapons proved most successful against poorly equipped indigenous armies.

Parallel to these developments, European engineers worked toward true automatic action. In the aftermath of the Second Schleswig War, Denmark began a program in 1864 to develop a gun that used the recoil of a fired shot to reload itself, though a working model would not appear until 1888. In 1870, Lt. Holsten Friberg of the Swedish army patented a fully automatic recoil-operated firearm action and may have produced firing prototypes of a derived design around 1882—the forerunner to the 1907 Kjellman machine gun—though rapid residue buildup from black powder made it impractical. Also in 1870, a Bavarian regiment of the Prussian army used a unique mitrailleuse-style weapon in the Franco-Prussian war, with four side-by-side barrels each fed by a breech hopper of 41 cartridges in place of the French mitrailleuse's manual loading; effective at times but hampered by mechanical difficulties, it was abandoned shortly after the war ended (de).

=== Maxim and World War I ===
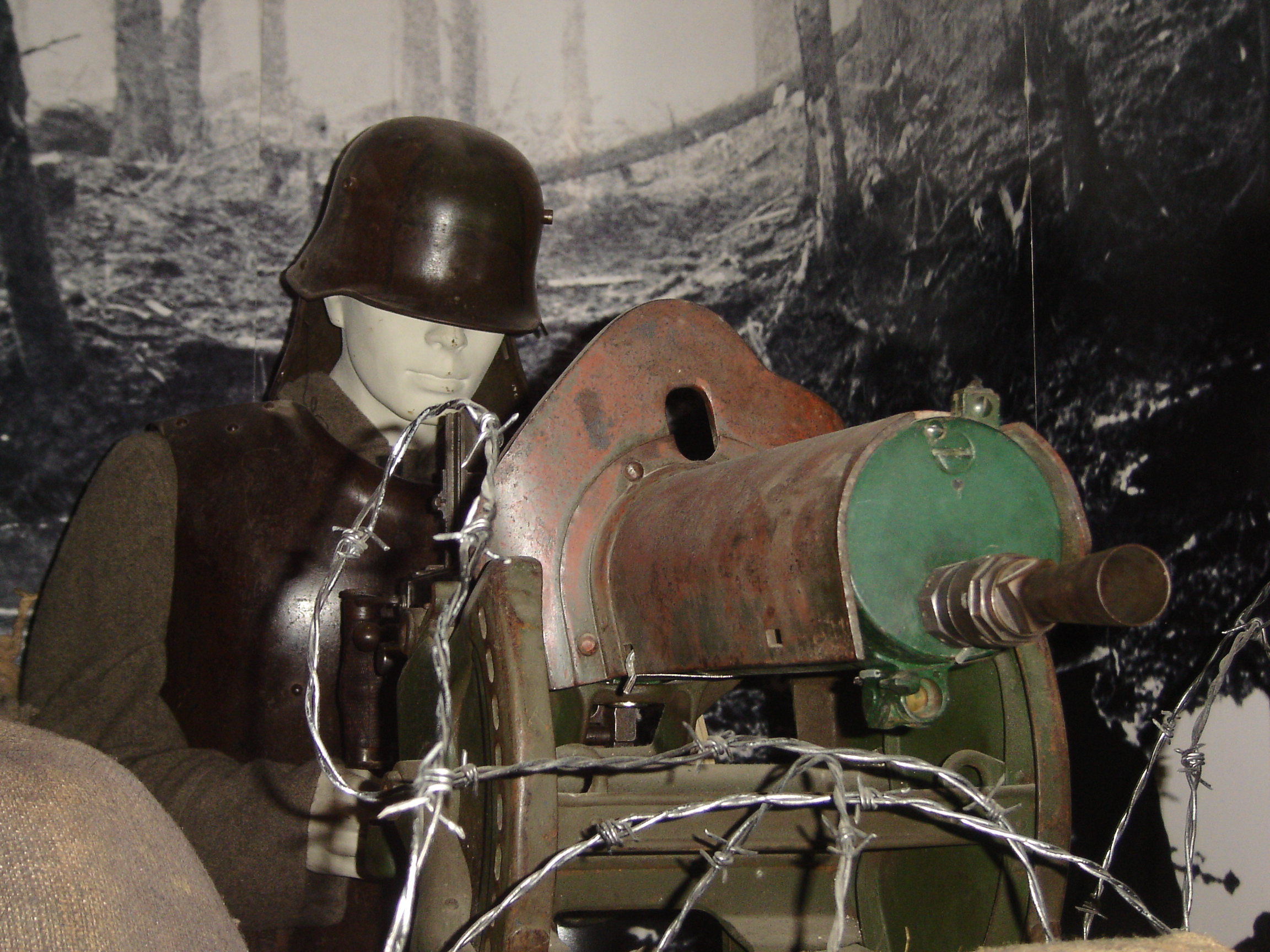
A model of a typical entrenched German machine gunner in World War I. He is operating an MG 08, wearing a Stahlhelm and cuirass to protect him from shell fragments, and protected by rows of barbed wire and sandbags.

The first practical self-powered machine gun was invented in 1884 by Sir Hiram Maxim. The Maxim machine gun used the recoil power of the previously fired bullet to cycle rather than being hand-powered, enabling a much higher rate of fire than was possible using earlier designs such as the Nordenfelt and Gatling weapons. Maxim also introduced the use of water cooling, via a water jacket around the barrel, to reduce overheating. Maxim's gun was widely adopted, and derivative designs were used on all sides during the First World War. The design required fewer crew and was lighter and more usable than the Nordenfelt and Gatling guns. First World War combat experience demonstrated the military importance of the machine gun. The United States Army issued four machine guns per regiment in 1912, but that allowance increased to 336 machine guns per regiment by 1919.

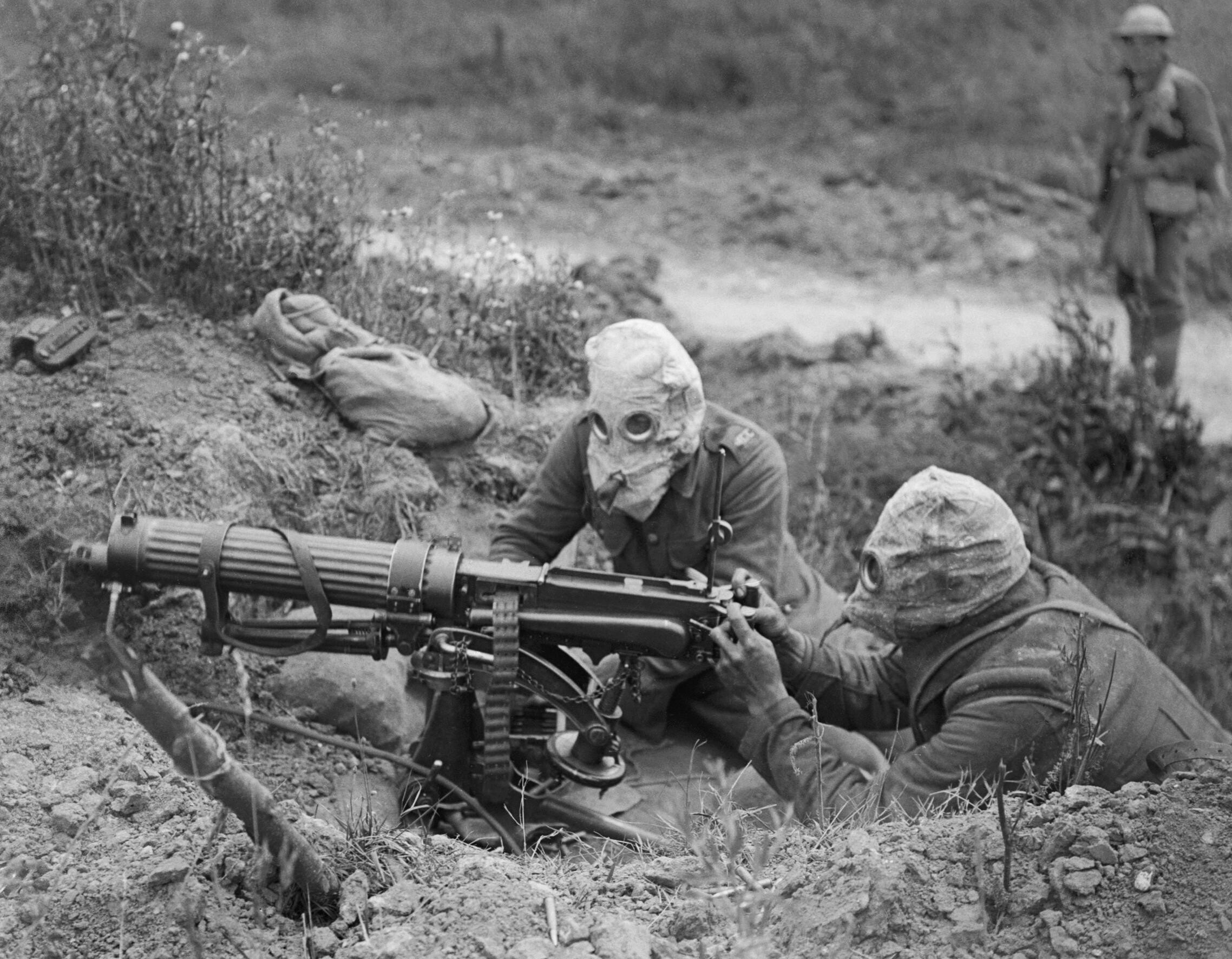
British Vickers machine gun in action near Ovillers during the Battle of the Somme in 1916. The crew is wearing gas masks.

Heavy guns based on the Maxim such as the Vickers machine gun were joined by many other machine weapons, which mostly had their start in the early 20th century such as the Hotchkiss machine gun. Submachine guns (e.g., the German MP 18) as well as lighter machine guns (the first light machine gun deployed in any significant number being the Madsen machine gun, with the Chauchat and Lewis gun soon following) saw their first major use in World War I, along with heavy use of large-caliber machine guns. The biggest single cause of casualties in World War I was actually artillery, but combined with wire entanglements, machine guns earned a fearsome reputation. The British Army's Motor Machine Gun Service used machine guns mounted on sidecars.

Another fundamental development occurring before and during the war was the incorporation by gun designers of machine gun auto-loading mechanisms into handguns, giving rise to semi-automatic pistols such as the Borchardt (1890s), automatic machine pistols and later submachine guns (such as the Beretta 1918).

Aircraft-mounted machine guns were first used in combat in World War I. Immediately this raised a fundamental problem. The most effective position for guns in a single-seater fighter was clearly, for the purpose of aiming, directly in front of the pilot; but this placement would obviously result in bullets striking the moving propeller. Early solutions, aside from simply hoping that luck was on the pilot's side with an unsynchronized forward-firing gun, involved either aircraft with pusher props like the Vickers F.B.5, Royal Aircraft Factory F.E.2 and Airco DH.2, wing mounts like that of the Nieuport 10 and Nieuport 11 which avoided the propeller entirely, or armored propeller blades such as those mounted on the Morane-Saulnier L which would allow the propeller to deflect unsynchronized gunfire. By mid 1915, the introduction of a reliable gun synchronizer by the Imperial German Flying Corps made it possible to fire a closed-bolt machine gun forward through a spinning propeller by timing the firing of the gun to miss the blades. The Allies had no equivalent system until 1916 and their aircraft suffered badly as a result, a period known as the Fokker Scourge, after the Fokker Eindecker, the first German plane to incorporate the new technology.

=== Interwar era and World War II ===
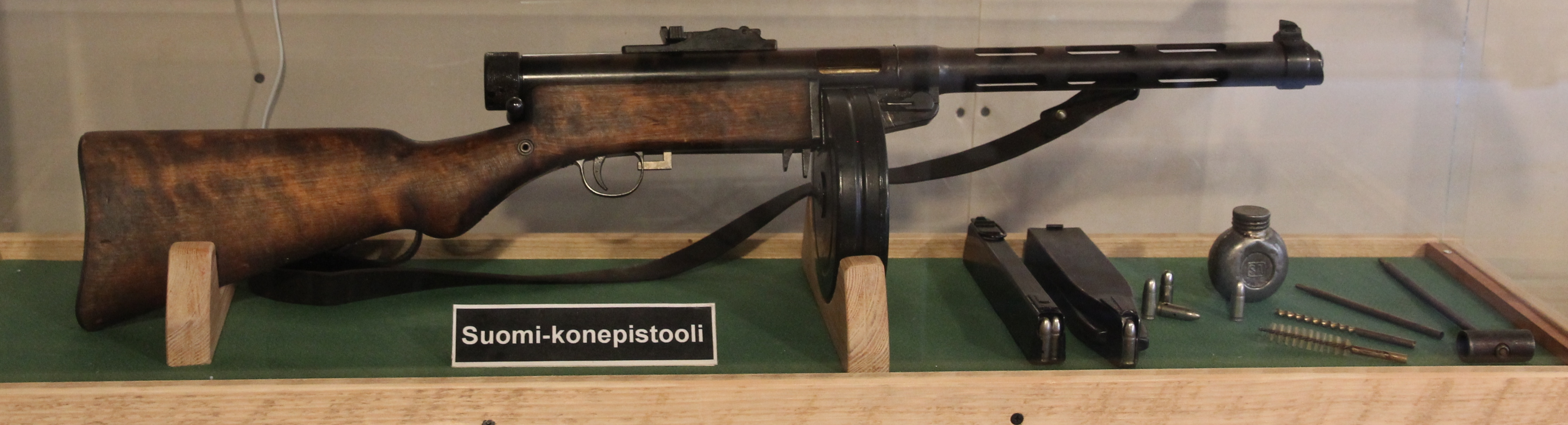
Suomi M31 submachine gun with 70-round drum magazine attached, 20- and 50-round box magazines

As better materials became available following the First World War, light machine guns became more readily portable; designs such as the Bren light machine gun replaced bulky predecessors like the Lewis gun in the squad support weapon role, while the modern division between medium machine guns like the M1919 Browning machine gun and heavy machine guns like the Browning M2 became clearer. New designs largely abandoned water jacket cooling systems as both undesirable, due to a greater emphasis on mobile tactics; and unnecessary, thanks to the alternative and superior technique of preventing overheating by swapping barrels.

The interwar years also produced the first widely used and successful general-purpose machine gun, the German MG 34. While this machine gun was equally able in the light and medium roles, it proved difficult to manufacture in quantity, and experts on industrial metalworking were called in to redesign the weapon for modern tooling, creating the MG 42. This weapon was simpler, cheaper to produce, fired faster, and replaced the MG 34 in every application except vehicle mounts since the MG 42's barrel changing system could not be operated when it was mounted.

=== Cold War ===
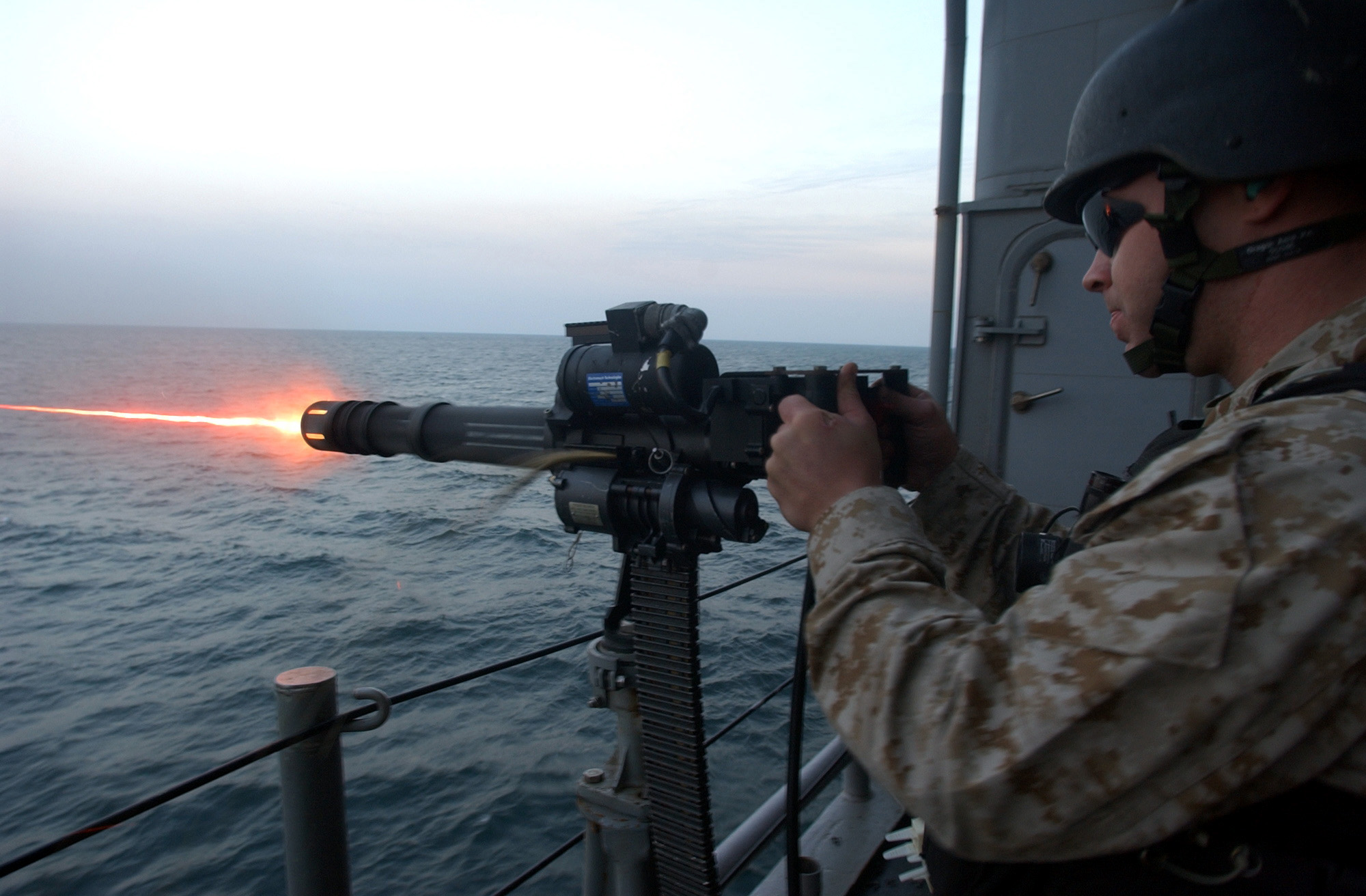
A U.S. Navy 7.62 mm GAU-17/A Minigun

Experience with the MG 42 led to the US issuing a requirement to replace the aging Browning Automatic Rifle with a similar weapon, which would also replace the M1919; simply using the MG 42 itself was not possible, as the design brief required a weapon which could be fired from the hip or shoulder like the BAR. The resulting design, the M60 machine gun, was issued to troops during the Vietnam War.

As it became clear that a high-volume-of-fire weapon would be needed for fast-moving jet aircraft to reliably hit their opponents, Gatling's work with electrically powered weapons was recalled and the 20 mm M61 Vulcan was designed; as well as a miniaturized 7.62 mm version initially known as the "mini-Vulcan" and quickly shortened to "minigun" soon in production for use on helicopters, where the volume of fire could compensate for the instability of the helicopter as a firing platform.

== Operation ==
A common ammunition loading system is to alternate solid ("ball") rounds and tracer ammunition rounds (usually one tracer round for every four ball rounds), so shooters can see the trajectory and "walk" the fire into the target, and direct the fire of other soldiers.

Because they become very hot, the great majority of designs fire from an open bolt, to permit air cooling from the breech between bursts. They also usually have either a barrel cooling system, slow-heating heavyweight barrel, or removable barrels which allow a hot barrel to be replaced.

=== Human interface ===
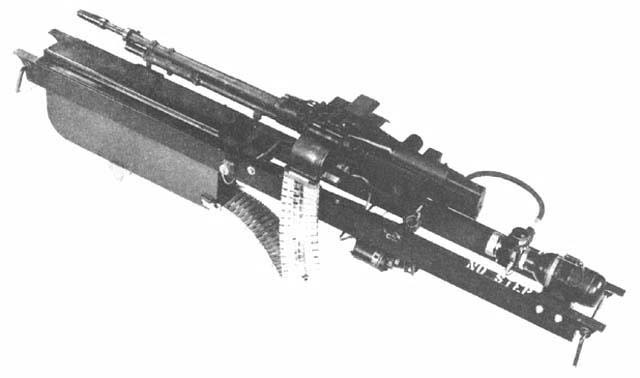
This M60 machine gun is part of an XM2 armament subsystem; it is aimed and fired from the aircraft rather than directly.

The most common interface on light machine guns is a pistol grip and trigger with a buttstock attached. Vehicle and tripod mounted machine guns usually have spade grips. Earlier machine guns commonly featured hand cranks, and modern externally powered machine guns, such as miniguns, commonly use an electronic button or trigger on a joystick. In the late 20th century, scopes and other complex optics became more common rather than the more basic iron sights.

Loading systems in early manual machine guns were often from a hopper of loose (un-linked) cartridges. Manually operated volley guns usually had to be reloaded all at once (each barrel reloaded by hand, or with a set of cartridges affixed to a plate that was inserted into the weapon). With hoppers, the rounds could often be added while the weapon was firing. This gradually changed to belt-fed systems, which were either held by a person (the shooter or a support person), or in a bag or box. Some modern vehicle machine guns use linkless feed systems.

Modern machine guns are commonly mounted in one of four ways. The first is a bipod, often integrated with the weapon, common on light and medium machine guns. Another is the tripod, usually found on medium and heavy machine guns. On ships, vehicles, and aircraft, machine guns are usually mounted on a pintle mount, a steel post that is connected to the frame or body of the vehicle. The last common mounting type is as part of a vehicle's armament system, such as a tank coaxial or part of an aircraft's armament. These are usually electrically fired and have complex sighting systems, for example, the US Helicopter Armament Subsystems.

== See also ==
- List of firearms
- List of machine guns
- List of multiple barrel machine guns
- Select fire
- Panjagan
