= Lorenzoni =

Lorenzoni is an Italian surname. Notable people with this surname include:

- Giulia Lorenzoni (born 1940), Italian fencer
- Giuseppe Lorenzoni (1843–1914), Italian astronomer
- Michele Lorenzoni (17th century), Italian gunsmith based in Florence
- Nicolai Lorenzoni (born 1992), German-Swiss footballer
- Onyx Lorenzoni (born 1954), Brazilian politician, businessman, and veterinarian
- Pietro Antonio Lorenzoni (1721–1782), Austrian painter

== See also ==
- 40447 Lorenzoni, a minore planet discovered on 11 September 1999, in Bologna, Italy
- Giardino Botanico Alpino "Giangio Lorenzoni", an alpine botanical garden located in Pian di Cansiglio, Province of Belluno, Italy
