= Kalthof =

Kalthof may refer to:

- a quarter of Iserlohn, Germany
- the German name for Rizhskoye, part of Kaliningrad, Russia
- the German name for Rydzówka, Elbląg County, Poland
- German name for Kałdowo, Malbork County, Poland
- Kalthoff gunsmiths
