= Repeating rifle =

Firearm that can fire multiple times between reloads

Schematic of manually operated firearms

A repeating rifle is a single-barreled rifle capable of repeated discharges between each ammunition reload. This is typically achieved by having multiple cartridges stored in a magazine (within or attached to the rifle) and then fed individually into the chamber by a reciprocating bolt, via either a manual or automatic action mechanism, while the act of chambering the round typically also recocks the hammer/striker for the following shot. In common usage, the term "repeating rifle" most often refers specifically to manual repeating rifles (e.g. lever-action, pump-action, bolt-action, etc.), as opposed to self-loading rifles, which use the recoil, gas, or blowback of the previous shot to cycle the action and load the next round, even though all self-loading firearms are technically a subcategory of repeating firearms.

Repeating rifles were a significant advance over the preceding single-shot, breechloading rifles when used for military combat, as they allowed a much greater rate of fire. The repeating Henry rifle was used by the infantry and Spencer rifle was used by the cavalry during the American Civil War and the subsequent American Indian Wars, and the first repeating air rifle to see military service was the Windbüchse rifle.

== Early repeaters ==
A list of various repeating rifles up to the late 1800s.

- Kalthoff repeater (about 1630)
- Cookson repeater (about 1650)
- Chelembron system (1668)
- Lagatz Rifle: a modification of the Lorenzoni System, designed by Danzig gunsmith Daniel Lagatz around the year 1700.
- Puckle gun (1718)
- Harmonica gun (1742)
- Cookson repeater (1750)
- Fafting rifle: In 1774 a rifle was invented by a Norwegian colonel by the name of Fafting capable of firing 18 to 20 shots a minute and being used as an ordinary rifle by taking off a spring-loaded container attached to the gun's lock. It was also stated that the inventor was working on a gun capable of firing up to 30 times in a minute on more or less the same principles.
- The Belton flintlock (<1777)
- Girardoni air rifle (1779)
- 1789 French rifle: In 1791 it was mentioned in a book published in France that there existed since at least 1789 a rifle that held 5 or 6 shots and was capable of being reloaded three times in a minute for a total of 15 or 18 shots a minute. A rifle similar in type to this was also stated to be kept at the Hôtel de la Guerre.
- Church and Bartemy/Bartholomew gun: A repeating rifle designed by the Americans William Church and Chrostus Bartemy or Bartholomew in 1813 with three separate magazines for containing up to 42 charges of ammunition and capable of firing 25 shots a minute. It could be reloaded in one minute.
- Thomson rifle: A flintlock repeating rifle patented in 1814, using multiple breeches to obtain repeating fire.
- Leroy rifle: In 1815 (sometimes incorrectly dated as 1825) a French inventor called Julien Leroy patented a flintlock and percussion revolving rifle with a mechanically indexed cylinder and a priming magazine.
- Collier's flintlock revolver (1818)
- Lepage guns: In 1819 a French gunsmith called Lepage invented and presented at the French industrial exposition of that year percussion 2-shot and 4-shot turn-over rifles. In 1823 he exhibited a volley rifle that fired seven rifled barrels simultaneously as well as a turning carbine. In 1827, the same inventor exhibited at another French industrial exposition eleven percussion and one flintlock firearms which included a 4-shot revolving rifle, a 'double rifle' with a cylinder with five charges and a 'single rifle' and a pair of pistols also with a cylinder with five charges.
- Pirmet-Baucheron revolving rifle: In 1822 a French gunsmith called Pirmet-Baucheron presented a revolving rifle with 7 shots and a single lock.
- Hewson magazine gun: In 1824 an English gunsmith called W. P. Hewson advertised, amongst other firearms and one air gun, a magazine gun.
- Jobard rifle: a turret rifle with 14 shots patented in Belgium in 1826 and presented to the government in 1835.
- Pottet-Delcusse rifle: In 1827 a French gunsmith received an award at an exposition for a four-shot breech-loading rifle.
- Devisme guns: A French gunsmith called Devisme claimed to have invented a double-action revolver around the time the Collier revolver was patented and to have produced a cartridge revolver using non-obturating steel cartridges that could be swapped out for a cylinder using caps and balls at the user's discretion in 1834 as well as having made to order and sold a seven-shot revolving rifle to 'an Arab chief' in 1835. Furthermore, Devisme presented a variety of firearms at a national exhibition in 1840 which included a pistol with a 'turning barrel' capable of firing 5 separate and successive times. In 1842 the same gunsmith would present a double-action revolving rifle for the French Academy of Sciences which was compared favourably with the revolving rifle invented by another French inventor called Philippe Mathieu around the same time. This rifle also came with a cylinder that could be swapped out in 3 seconds, according to the inventor. Also in 1842 Devisme would demonstrate at the French Industrial Exposition of that year, amongst other firearms, a rifle with a 'turning barrel', no lock and 8 shots, another rifle with 6 shots and one barrel, and two revolving pistols with 5 and 8 shots each. In 1844 at the French Industrial Exposition of that year Devisme would again demonstrate more repeating firearms including an 18 shot pistol described as a 'shapeless mass' with no visible hammer or lock and actuated solely by the pressure of the finger, a 6 shot pistol with percussion hammer, a rifle with 6 shots and a 'revolving breech' and a 4 shot 'double acting' rifle.
- Silas Day magazine gun: A percussion revolving rifle to which was attached a loose-powder-and-ball magazine patented in the US in 1837.
- Colt ring lever rifles (1837)
- Bailey, Ripley and Smith magazine rifle: In 1838 the Americans Lebbeus Bailey, John B. Ripley and William B. Smith patented a percussion repeating rifle with a gravity-operated tubular magazine which could hold up to 15 re-useable steel cartridge-chambers.
- Eaton rifle: In 1838 a percussion rifle invented in America by James Eaton was described as being capable of holding 24 rounds in a rotating magazine and discharging them all in four minutes for a rate of fire of 6 rounds per minute.
- Kratsch rifle: In 1839 it was reported that a mechanic called Kratsch from Bayreuth had invented a rifle capable of firing 30 times in a minute and being reloaded in one minute.
- Jennings magazine rifle: in 1847 Walter Hunt patented in Britain a repeating rifle he called "the Volitional Repeater". He would patent it again in the United States in 1849. This rifle featured a tubular magazine beneath the barrel and a lever mechanism to raise cartridges into the chamber. Unable to finance the building of the rifle, Hunt sold the rights to George Arrowsmith who in turn had an employee, Lewis Jennings, improve the lever mechanism. Courtland Palmer placed the first order for the "Jennings Magazine rifle" for his hardware store: Robbins & Lawrence. The rifle did not sell well as the ammunition was a hollow based bullet containing gunpowder. Most of the guns were later converted to single shot rifles. Two employees working at Robbins & Lawrence: Horace Smith and Daniel B. Wesson improved the design and sold it as the "Smith-Jennings Repeating Rifle". At first they used a slightly modified Flobert cartridge, patented in 1853, but later they would switch to a modified Rocket Ball type of ammunition altered so as to function as a self-contained centerfire cartridge.
- Cass repeating belt gun: A percussion repeating rifle patented in 1848 in the US using a chain or belt in the stock which carried paper cartridges to the breech of the gun.
- Buchel cartridge magazine gun: The first tubular cartridge magazine gun to be patented in the United States in February 1849.
- Perry 'faucet-breech' gun: A hinged or tilting breech repeating rifle patented in the US in December 1849 by Alonzo Perry using paper cartridges contained in several gravity-operated tubular magazines in the stock and a separate magazine for fulminate pills which were used for ignition.
- Porter self-loading gun: In February 1851 a loose-powder-and-ball percussion magazine gun invented by a Parry W. Porter, better known for the turret rifle he invented and to which the magazine for his loose-powder-and-ball gun was to be attached, was reported on in American newspapers and later in the same year a patent was procured by the inventor.
- Needham self-loading carbine: A self-loading carbine demonstrated in June 1851 at the Great Exhibition by Joseph Needham.
- Dixon self-loading and self-priming gun: A repeating gun demonstrated by a C. S. Dixon which won a silver award at the Annual Fair of the American Institute in October 1851.
- 1854 Lindner revolving rifle: In 1854 the German Edward Lindner patented in the United States and Britain a repeating rifle which used a revolving cylinder to elevate the cartridges, which were paper and could be either self-contained needlefire cartridges or use external percussion caps for ignition, to the breech from a tubular magazine located under the barrel.
- Colette gravity pistol: A repeating saloon gun premiered at the 1855 World's Fair. Despite popularly being known as the Colette gravity pistol, its original inventor was actually a Belgian called Jean Nicolas Herman.
- Colt revolving rifle (1855)
- Leroux magazine gun: At the Exposition Universelle (1855) in France a French gunsmith called Leroux demonstrated a repeating carbine with a magazine for 36 Flobert cartridges and which featured a novel cartridge extractor.
- Henry rifle(1860)
- Spencer repeating rifle (1860)
- Roper repeating shotgun (1882/1885)

== Mechanisms ==
=== Manual ===
==== Revolver action ====
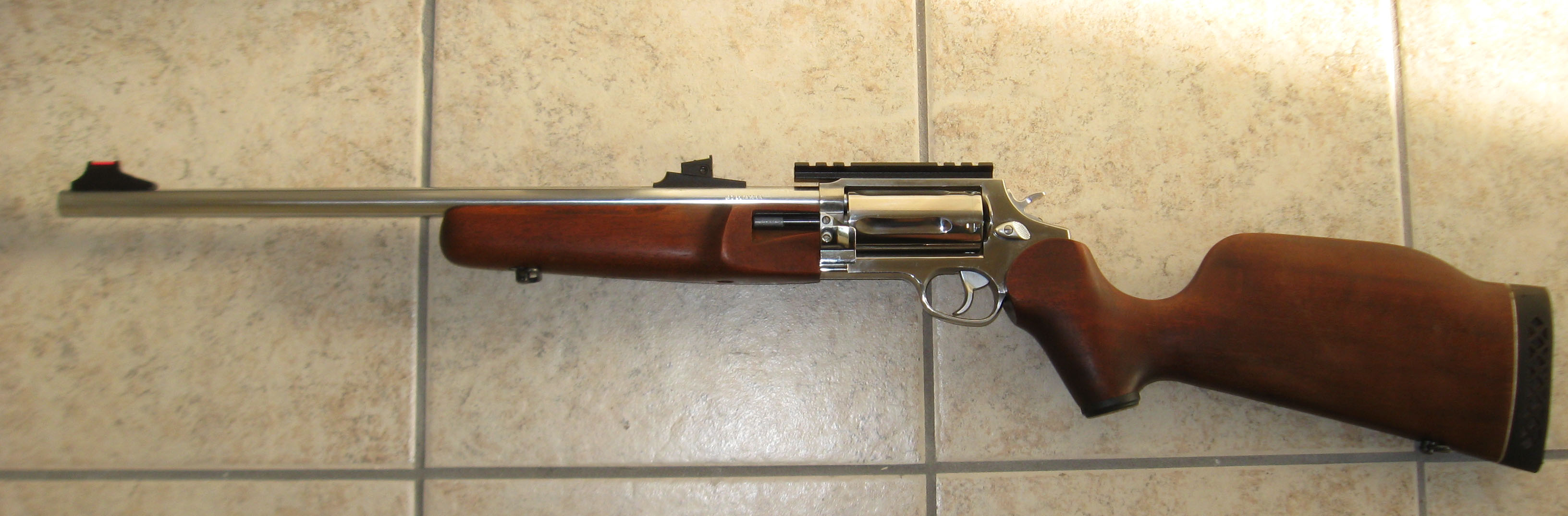
Circuit Judge revolver mechanism carbine

While some early long guns were made using the revolver mechanism popular in handguns, these did not have longevity. Even though the revolver mechanism was fine for pistols, it posed a problem with long guns: without special sealing details, the cylinder produces a gas discharge close to the face when the weapon is fired from the shoulder, as was the common approach with rifles.

==== Falling block action ====
Although most falling-blocks were single-shot actions, some early repeaters used this design, notably the Norwegian Krag–Petersson and the U. S. Spencer rifle. The former loaded from a Henry-style underbarrel magazine; the latter fed from a tubular magazine in the buttstock.

==== Lever action ====
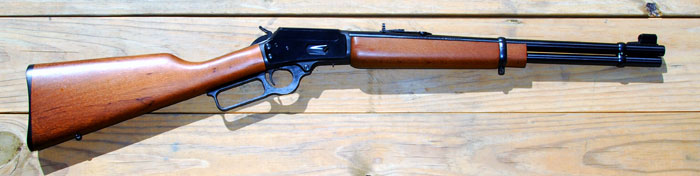
Marlin Model 1894C lever-action carbine in .357 Magnum caliber

In a classic lever-action firearm of the Henry-Winchester type, rounds are individually loaded into a tubular magazine parallel to and below the barrel. A short bolt is held in place with an over center toggle action. Once closed, the over center action prevents opening solely by the force on the bolt when the weapon is fired. This toggle action is operated by a hand grip that forms part of the trigger guard. When operated, a spring in the tubular magazine pushes a fresh round into position. Returning the operating lever to the home position chambers the round and closes the breach. An interlock prevents firing unless the toggle is fully closed. The famous Model 1873 Winchester is exemplary of this type. Later lever-action designs, such as Marlin leverguns and those designed for Winchester by John Browning, use one or two vertical locking blocks instead of a toggle-link. There also exist lever-action rifles that feed from a box magazine, which allows them to use pointed bullets.

A one-off example of Lever action reloading on automatic firearms is the M1895 Colt–Browning machine gun. This weapon had a swinging lever beneath its barrel that was actuated by a gas bleed in the barrel, unlocking the breech to reload. This unique operation gave the nickname "potato digger" as the lever swung each time the weapon fired.

==== Pump action ====
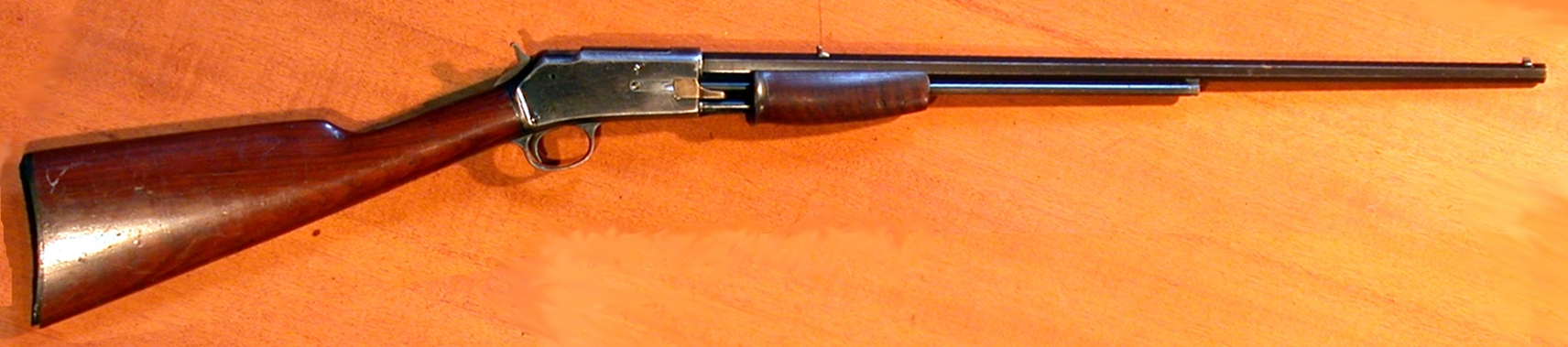
The Colt Lightning .22 pump action rifle

With a pump-action firearm, the action is operated by a movable fore-end that the shooter moves backwards and forwards to eject a spent round, and extract and chamber a fresh round of ammunition. Pump-actions are usually associated with shotguns, but one example of a pump-action rifle is the Remington Model 7600 series. Rifles with pump action are also called slide-action. This style of rifle is still popular with some local law enforcement branches as a rifle that is easy to train officers who are already familiar with the pump shotgun.

==== Bolt action ====
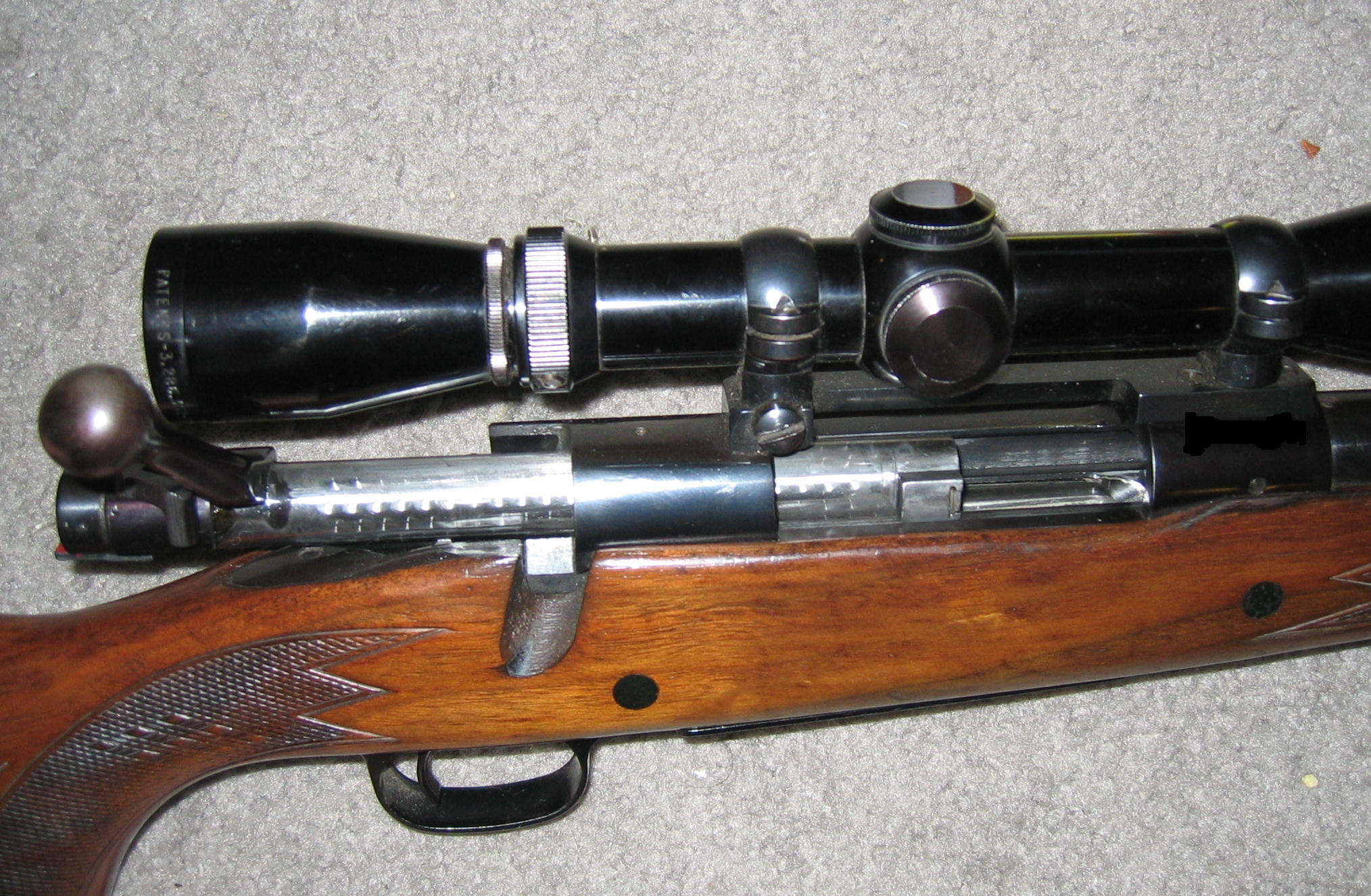
Opened bolt on a Winchester Model 70. The bolt has an engine turned finish

The bolt is a mechanism that is operated by hand to extract a fired cartridge, move a fresh round into the chamber and reset the firing pin, readying the weapon to fire again. The bolt closes the breech end of the barrel and contains the firing pin. The bolt is held in place with a lever that fits into a notch. Moving this lever out of the notch will release the restraint on the bolt, allowing it to be drawn back. An extractor removes the spent cartridge, which is then ejected through the lever slot. A spring at the bottom of the magazine pushes up the reserve rounds, positioning the topmost between the bolt and the chamber at the base of the barrel. Pushing the bolt lever forward chambers this round and pushing the lever into the notch locks the bolt and enables the trigger mechanism. The complete cycle action also resets the firing pin. The Mauser rifle of the late 19th and early 20th centuries is the most famous of the bolt-action types, with most similar weapons derived from this pioneering design, such as the M1903 Springfield and the Karabiner 98 Kurz rifle (abbreviated often as Kar98k or simply K98). The Russian Mosin–Nagant rifle, the British Lee–Enfield, and the Norwegian Krag–Jørgensen are examples of bolt-action designs.

=== Autoloading ===
==== Blowback ====
In blowback operation, the bolt is not actually locked at the moment of firing. To prevent violent recoil, in most firearms using this mechanism the opening of the bolt is delayed in some way. In many small arms, the round is fired while the bolt is still travelling forward, and the bolt does not open until this forward momentum is overcome. Other methods involve delaying the opening until two rollers have been forced back into recesses in the receiver in which the bolt is carried. Simple blowback action is simple and inexpensive to manufacture, but is limited in the power it can handle, so it is seen on small caliber weapons such as machine pistols and submachine guns. Lever-delayed blowback, as seen in for example the French FAMAS assault rifle, can also handle more powerful cartridges but is more complicated and expensive to manufacture.

==== Recoil-operated ====
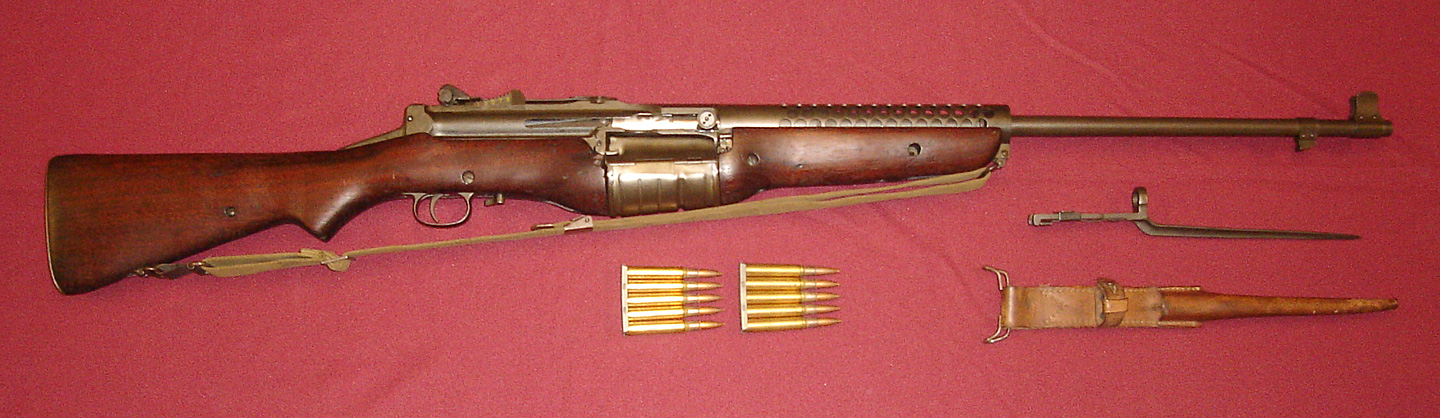
M1941 Johnson rifle

In a recoil-operated firearm, the breech is locked, and the barrel recoils as part of the firing cycle. In long-recoil actions, such as the Browning Auto-5 shotgun, the barrel and breechblock remain locked for the full recoil travel, and separate on the return; in short-recoil actions, typical of most semiautomatic handguns (e.g. the Colt M1911), the barrel recoils only a short distance before decoupling from the breechblock.

==== Gas-operated ====
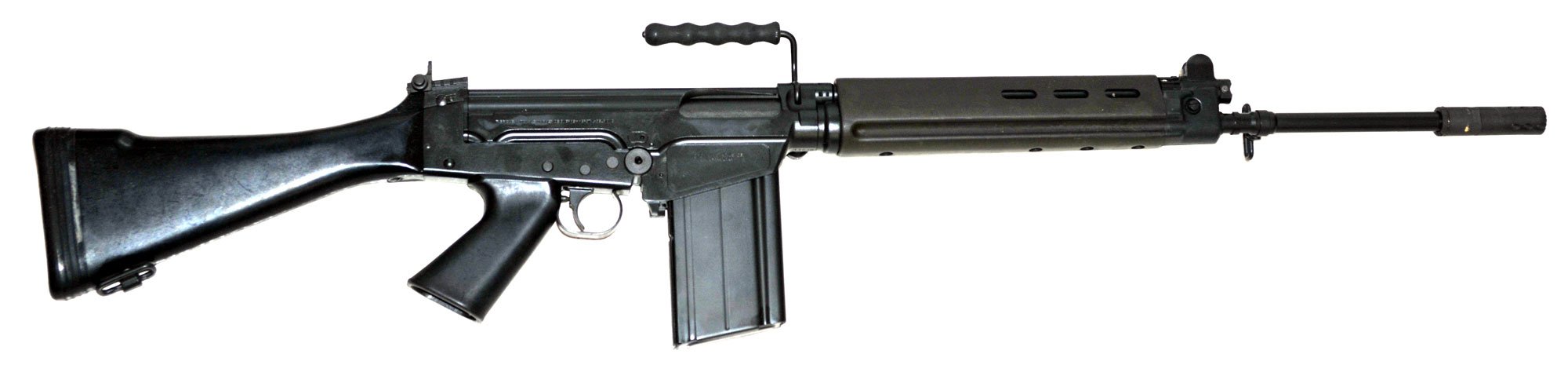
FN FAL battle rifle

In a gas-operated mechanism, a portion of the gases propelling the bullet from the barrel are extracted and used to operate a piston. The motion of this piston in turn unlocks and operates the bolt, which performs extraction of the spent cartridge and via spring action readies the next round. Almost all modern military rifles use mechanisms of this type.

== See also ==
- Repeating firearm
- Belton flintlock
- Cookson repeater
- Kalthoff repeater
- Nordenfelt Gun
