= Cookson (disambiguation) =

Cookson is an English surname.

Cookson may also refer to:

- Cookson Hills, Oklahoma, part of The Ozarks
- Cookson Group, a British industrial materials and processes company
- Cookson, Oklahoma, rural community in the Cookson Hills of Cherokee County, Oklahoma, United States
- Cookson repeater, a rifle
