= Lorenzon =

Lorenzon is an Italian surname. Notable people with the surname include:

- Gianni Solaro (born Gianni Lorenzon; 1926), Italian film and television actor
- Juri Lorenzon (or Yuriy Lorentsson ), Russian rowing coxswain
- Livio Lorenzon (1923–1971), Italian actor
- Víctor Hugo Lorenzón (born 1977), Argentine footballer

== See also ==
- Lorenzoni
- Stadio Marco Lorenzon, a multi-use stadium in Rende, Italy
