= Kalthoff gunsmiths =

The Kalthoff gunsmiths were a prominent Danish-German family of gunsmiths during the 17th century, best known for the Kalthoff repeater — a rapid fire flintlock repeating rifle that could reach a rate of fire of 20–30 rounds/minute. Signed specimens of their guns can be found kept in the Windsor Castle, the Danish War Museum, the Swedish Royal Armoury and the Kremlin Armoury collections.

The family was founded by Herman Kolthoff from Kultenhof Estate in the Danish Duchy of Schleswig (now Kaltenhof, Schleswig-Holstein, Germany), who had several sons that went on to fame across Europe.

- Peder Hermansen Kalthoff — Served Frederik III of Denmark as Head of Armory, 1600–1672
- Matthias Hermansen Kalthoff — Gunsmith Denmark, 1608–1681
- Caspar Hermansen Kalthoff Elder — Served Charles I of England, 1606–1664
  - Caspar Kalthoff Younger — Served Tsar Alexis of Russia and Charles II of England
- Henrick Hermansen Kalthoff — Founded Foundries in Sweden and Norway, 1610–1661
- William Hermansen Kalthoff — Patented repeating gun in France

Their guns have been described as advance clockworks centuries ahead of their time as seen in this disassembly of one shown here Kalthoff 30-Shot Flintlock: The First Repeating Firearm Used in War (1659) - Forgotten Weapons

== Descendants ==
The Kalthoff name is a single family name, and spelling name was recorded as Kaldtoft, Kalthof, Kaltof, Kaltoft, Koldtoft according to local pronunciation and spelling habits. All of the families with these names in Scandinavia are descendants. The original seed Kalthoff in each country shared the "Hermansen" name indicating a common father, was famous for advanced metallurgic skills (iron manufacturing, advanced steel formula for repeating rifles, etc.), and were born within a decade of each other.
