= Chelembron system =

- Place of origin: Italy

Production history
- Designer: Michele Lorenzoni
- Designed: 1668

Specifications
- Feed system: Separate magazines, 20 Rounds

The Chelembron system was a magazine system used for flintlock repeating rifles that originated around 1668. While the invention of the system is attributed to Michele Lorenzoni, the system is named after French gun-makers who made many guns in India using the system. The basis of the Chelembron system is a barrel, as well as magazines, that rotate around a central axis, and are turned to load first powder and then ball into the breech. Weapons of the system carry 20 rounds.

== Origin and manufacture ==
The earliest known weapon that uses the Chelembron system, dated 1668, was signed by T. Lefer Avalenza. Chelembron made multiple rifles using the system in India in the second half of the 18th century. A magazine gun that belonged to George III also bears the name "Chalembrom". In 1779, a former French soldier named Claude Martin, was given the position of Superintendent of Artillery and Arsenals to the Nawab of Oudh. While Claude held this position, many impressive weapons were made at the Lucknow Arsenal. At least one gun made here, which bears both his name and the name of the arsenal, uses the Chelembron system. A Chelembron gun manufactured in 1785 is heavily damaged, and appears to have been retrieved from a battlefield. Pistols using the system were also made, with a pair being manufactured around 1800.

== Mechanics ==
Separate tubular magazines containing powder and ball sit under the barrel. To reload the weapon, the gun is pointed upwards, the release trigger is depressed, and the barrel can be rotated, causing the attached magazines to rotate over the breech, which deposits a load of powder, and primes the pan. At the same time, the cock is rotated to the firing position and the pan is closed. This movement of the magazines also causes a ball to drop into a compartment in the rear section of the gun, which is then pushed into the rear of the barrel by a plunger. The breech and ball-plunger compartments are separate fixed chambers attached to the stock and lock part of the weapon.
