= Superposed load =

Use of stacked charges in a firearm

A four-shot superposed load pistol, with the lock positioned to ignite the rear-most charge. The covers for the forward touchholes are open.

A superposed load or stacked charge or superimposed load is a method used by various muzzle-loading firearms, from matchlocks to caplocks, including a few modern weapons, such as Metal Storm, to fire multiple shots from a single barrel without reloading. In a sense, superposed load guns were the first automatic firearms, as they fired multiple shots per pull of the trigger.

== Design ==
Superposed loads are loads that are placed in the barrel, one in front of the other, so that there is an alternating sequence of (starting from the breach end) powder, ball, powder, ball, etc., for the desired number of charges. Each charge is accompanied by a corresponding touch hole that allows ignition of that charge. In the simplest case, the matchlock, each touch hole is individually primed and ignited with the match, front to rear. Each ball behind the first acts as a seal, to prevent ignition of the next charge.

A four shot superposed load flintlock musket built for militia use in 1824. The lock is positioned to ignite the front-most charge, and the rearward toucholes are protected by rotating covers.

Flintlocks using superposed charges often involved a sliding lock, that slid along the barrel and locked in place at each successive touch hole. The lock would be primed, cocked, and fired at each touch hole to discharge successive charges. Some caplock designs used multiple hammers, each impacting a nipple leading to a different charge, allowing true rapid fire.

== History ==
Designs using superposed loads have appeared periodically throughout firearms history, though they have met with only limited success. They have always been plagued with issues of sequential charges firing together, which can result in a burst barrel and injury to the user.

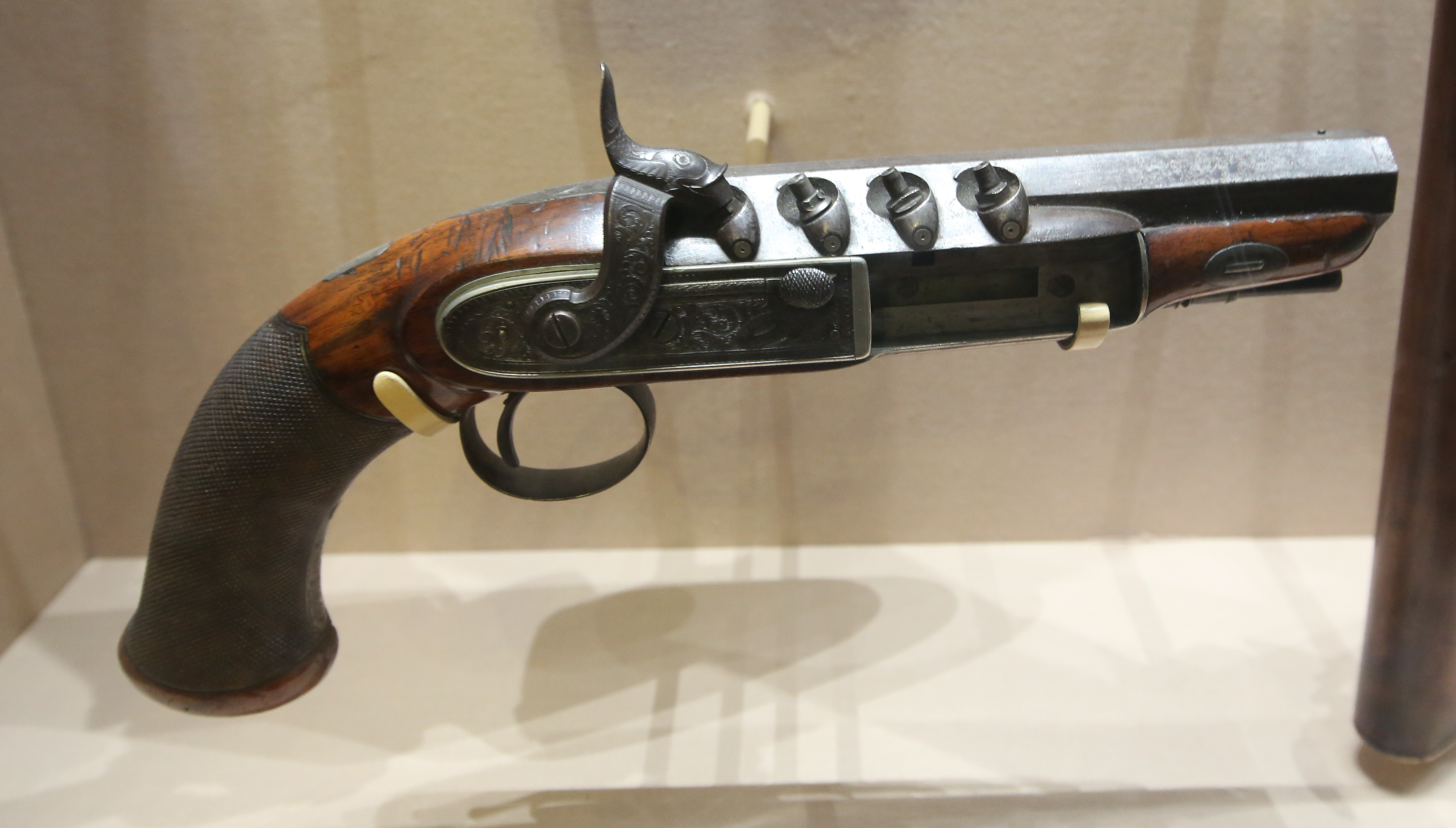
A superimposed load pistol made in Britain by William Mills in approximately 1830

- An early mention of superposed loads is made by Giambattista della Porta in his book Magia Naturalis (published in 1558), wherein he describes a brass gun that could discharge ten or more bullets "without intermission." Porta's description is very similar to a Roman candle, in that it uses a propellant charge topped with an undersized ball, followed by a slower-burning charge to add a delay, repeating until the muzzle is reached. The chain of charges is fired by igniting the last layer of slow-burning powder, whereupon the gun fires each charge in succession.
- Samuel Pepys also mentions in a 1662 entry of his diary a gun that would discharge seven times, and described it as "very serviceable."
- A British patent for superposed loads in a single barrel was issued in 1682 to Charles Cardiff.
- Another British patent using superposed loads and featuring a sliding lock was issued to John Aitken in 1780.
- American inventor Joseph Belton combined the earlier superposed load concepts into the Belton flintlock, which used a sliding lock with multiple touchholes to ignite separated sets of fused charges, allowing multiple shots per pull of the trigger and multiple shots to be fired by repositioning and recharging the lock. Belton attempted to license his invention to the Continental Congress in 1777, and to the British Army and the East India Company in 1784.
- An American gunsmith, Isaiah Jennings, produced a superposed load gun mentioned in a New York Evening Post article on April 10, 1822. The article claims the gun consists of a single barrel and lock, which may fire fifteen to twenty charges, which can be fired in the space of two seconds per charge. Jennings' gun adds, in addition to the sliding lock and multiple touchholes of earlier designs, a mechanism for automatically priming the pan of the lock, meaning each shot can be fired by simply cocking the lock and pulling the trigger. A 12-shot, breech-loading flintlock version of Jennings rifle, serial number 1, sold for US$34,000 at auction in 2006.
- The Metal Storm design attempted to solve these problems, but was a commercial failure.

== See also ==
- Belton flintlock, a system using a fused set of superposed loads for rapid fire
- Metal Storm Limited, a modern, electronically controlled superposed load system
- Walch Revolvers, Civil War era 12-shot .36" caliber and .30" caliber 10-shot cap-and-ball revolvers employing superimposed loads and sequentially triggered double hammers.
