= Giuseppe Lorenzoni =

Italian astronomer

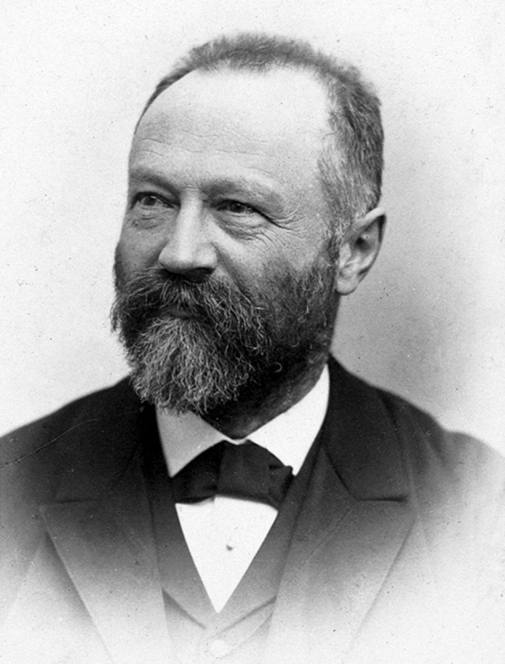

Giuseppe Lorenzoni (10 July 1843 – 7 July 1914) was an Italian astronomer who identified helium on the sun using spectroscopy, independently of others like Charles Augustus Young. He served as a director of the Padua Observatory from 1878 until his death and served as a professor of astronomy at the University of Padua from 1872.

Lorenzoni was born in Rolle di Cison di Valmarino, Veneto and was educated at Follina. He also studied in Venice at the Scuola Reale Superiore at a time when Luigi Alessandro Parravicini was involved in reforms in the educational system. He then went to the University of Padua, graduating in 1864 after which he worked as an assistant to Giovanni Santini at the Padua Observatory. He was initially involved in meteorological work and from 1867 he also taught geodesy and astronomy. In 1870 he went to observe a total solar eclipse from Sicily. Here he observed the solar corona with direct spectroscopy. Here he observed a bright line at 4472 Å which came to be called the Lorenzoni f line. He later measured gravitational force and in 1874 he went to India to observe the transit of Venus. He became a professor of astronomy at the University of Padua in 1872 and was noted for his teaching, his students included Antonio Abetti, Giuseppe Ciscato, Bortolo Viaro, Tullio Levi-Civita, Emilio Bianchi, and Antonio Maria Antoniazzi.
