= Armand Barnevelt =

17th Century Dutch Gunsmith

- Born: Unknown Date; The Netherlands
- Died: c. November 7, 1661; London, UK
- Occupation(s): Gunsmith and firearms inventor

Armand Barnevelt (died c. 7 November 1661) was a Dutch gunsmith. He is known for his weapons made in England, where he immigrated around 1642. He is mostly known as Harman Barnes (or Barne).

== Immigration to England ==
Bernevelt is first mentioned in England in the spring of 1642. He is noted as living in Lambeth at this time. Maps at the time indicate Lambeth was a rural area. Barnevelt likely moved there hurriedly, and seeking obscurity, after a possibly fatal explosion of a magazine firearm he made.

== Notable weapons ==
=== Flawed Magazine gun of 1638 ===
The earliest mention of Armand is on a magazine gun which bears his name, as well as the year 1638. This weapon was a breech loading gun which used a turn-off barrel. It also featured a magazine in the butt, which the breech end of the barrel could be inserted into. A ball and a charge of powder would be loaded into the breech, and the barrel could be removed and screwed back onto the gun. While this allowed fast reloading, it was also very dangerous. After firing the weapon a few times, the barrel became extremely hot, causing ignition of the powder magazine. This is what happened to the gun, as it is missing the lock piece and the butt is damaged. The accident was undoubtedly severe, and possibly killed the user.

=== Kalthoff-style repeater c. 1650 ===
A magazine firearm made around 1650 is signed Harman Barne Londini, though lacks marks of proof. It can be assumed Armand made this weapon in London, though it is also possible he imported it from Holland. As Armand made other repeaters with the assistance of Caspar Kalthoff, it seems likely it is his original construction. The weapon likely did not reach a finished state until 1651, as Barnevelt was in prison for a at least a year after 1649.
