= Nicolai Lorenzoni =

German-Swiss footballer (born 1992)

Personal information
- Date of birth: 1 May 1992 (age 34)
- Place of birth: Liestal, Switzerland
- Height: 1.80 m (5 ft 11 in)
- Position: Left-back

Team information
- Current team: KSV Baunatal

Youth career
- SV Herten
- Basel
- 2007–2008: SV Herten
- 2009–2011: SC Freiburg

Senior career*
Years	Team	Apps	(Gls)
2011–2015	SC Freiburg II	81	(2)
2013	SC Freiburg	1	(0)
2015	Chemnitzer FC II	5	(0)
2015	Chemnitzer FC	7	(0)
2015–2017	Hessen Kassel	54	(0)
2017–2018	TuS Koblenz	28	(1)
2018–2019	Rot-Weiß Erfurt	13	(0)
2021–	KSV Baunatal	0	(0)

International career
2011	Germany U20	3	(0)
- * Club domestic league appearances and goals as of 25 August 2017

Nicolai Lorenzoni (born 1 May 1992) is a German-Swiss professional footballer who plays as a left-back for KSV Baunatal.

== Career ==
Lorenzoni played in Switzerland for SV Herten and Basel. In January 2009 he joined SC Freiburg.

He made his first team debut for SC Freiburg on 1 December 2013 in a 1–0 away defeat against Borussia Mönchengladbach. He replaced Francis Coquelin after 82 minutes.

Lorenzeni joined KSV Hessen Kassel from Chemnitzer FC for the 2015–16 season.
