= Belton flintlock =

- Type: Musket
- Place of origin: United States

Production history
- Designer: Joseph Belton
- Designed: Prior to 1777

Specifications
- Action: Repeating flintlock
- Rate of fire: 30–60 rounds/min theoretically
- Effective firing range: 30 yd (27 m)
- Feed system: 8, 16 or 20 shots per reload

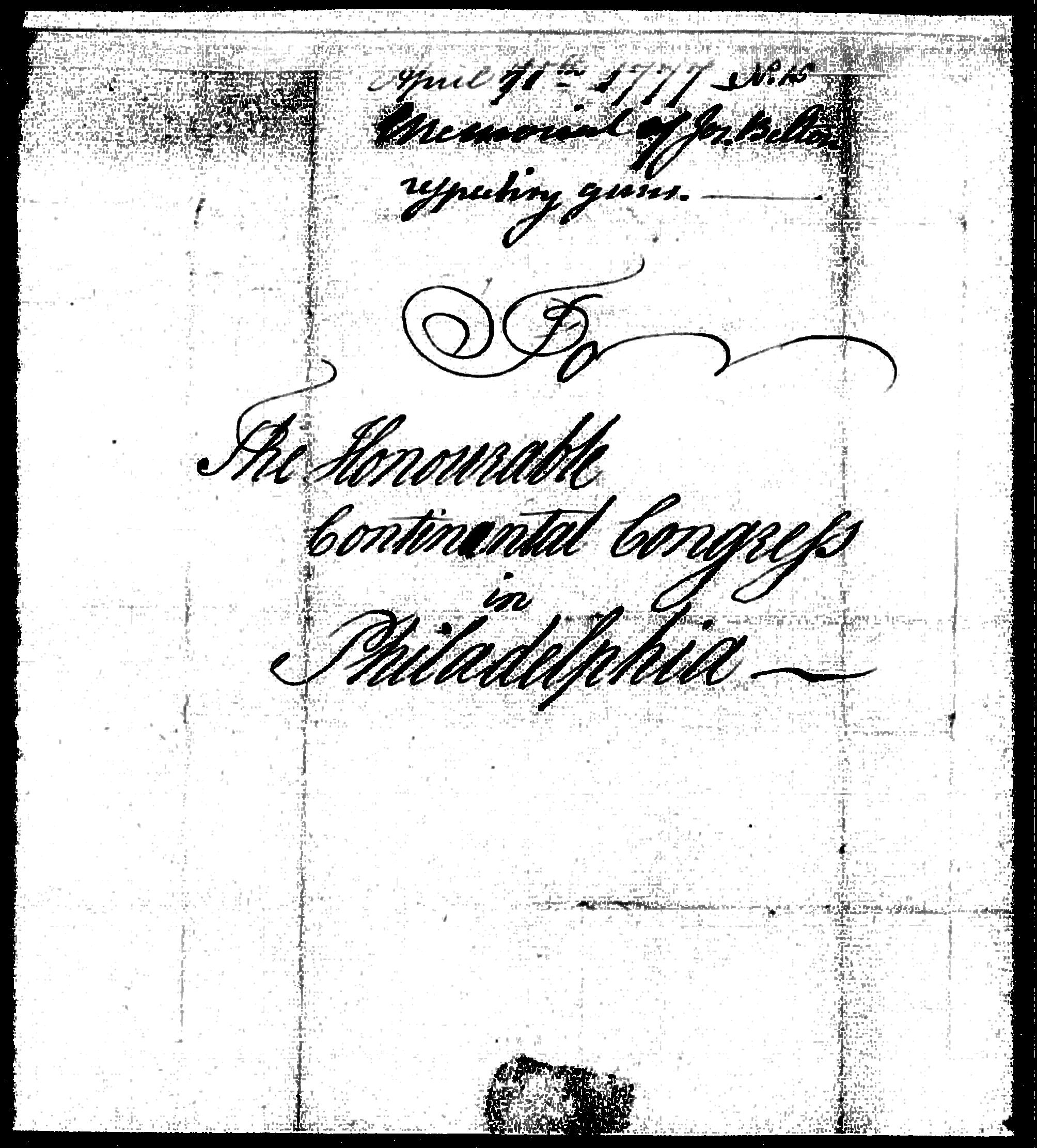
Cover page of Belton's first letter to the Continental Congress, sent April 11, 1777

The Belton flintlock was a repeating flintlock design using superposed loads, conceived by Philadelphia, Pennsylvania, resident Joseph Belton some time prior to 1777. The musket design was offered by Belton to the newly formed Continental Congress in 1777. Belton wrote that the musket could fire eight rounds with one loading, and that he could support his claims "by experimental proof." Belton failed to sell the musket to Congress, and later was unable to sell the design to the British Army a year after the American Revolution. There are no records that indicate that the gun was ever supplied, and it is uncertain if or how exactly the Belton improvement operated.

== Musket design ==
There are no known surviving examples of the musket Belton demonstrated to Congress. The only evidence of its existence is the correspondence between Belton and Congress. There are however two surviving examples in the United Kingdom's Royal Armories, including a novel improvement in the flintlock's function and safety features in the 1786 model, that also saw the inclusion of a contained port fire ignited by the first shot. A series of brass triggers would be pulled to advance the lock to the next flash hole, either to ignite the next stacked charge by cooking and dropping the flint or by use of the pre-lit port hole containing a slow burning Fuse or viscous fuel.

Belton described the musket as capable of firing up to "eight balls one after another, in eight, five, or three seconds of time," at a distance of 25–30 yd (23–27 m). He also claimed to have a secret method of modifying this weapon to discharge "sixteen or twenty [balls], in sixteen, ten, or five seconds of time." Historian Harold L. Peterson argued that because it was described as having a predetermined number of shots and rate of fire, it may have worked with a single lock igniting a fused chain of charges stacked in a single barrel, packaged as a single large paper cartridge.

Congress commissioned Belton to build or modify 100 muskets for the military on May 3, 1777, but the order was cancelled on May 15, when Congress received Belton's bid and considered it an "extraordinary allowance." After the war, Belton attempted to sell the design to the British Army, without success.

== Other Belton superposed load guns ==
While no examples of the converted muskets demonstrated to Congress are known, Belton did not give up on the concept of superposed load firearms. After the American Revolution, Belton began looking for buyers for superposed load flintlocks in England.

=== British Seven shot muskets ===
Belton then began making superposed load flintlocks, which used a sliding lock mechanism, with the London gunsmith William Jover, and provided one or more examples to the British army for teseting. The replaceable chamber makes this example both a breechloader, and effectively gives it a seven shot replaceable magazine. It is not known if multiple magazines were issued per gun, though this was possible (see here for a similar scenario with percussion revolvers). The lock slides from front to rear, with a second trigger provided that slides the lock from touch hole to touch hole, allowing each successive charge to be ignited. The lock did require cocking and priming between shots; while this would take time, the sliding lock would have provided a much higher rate of fire over a typical single shot musket of the era.

While the British rejected Belton's design, a further refined version (also a 7 shot model with replaceable breech section) was sold to the East India Company in 1785 in rifle, carbine, and pistol form, numbering 560 total firearms, for a total of 2250 pounds sterling. The guns were shipped to India, but there are no written reports of their use, or how well they worked in service. An example of a seven shot sliding lock flintlock musket made by Jover and Belton may be found in the Royal Armouries Museum collection in Leeds. This musket, rack numbered 124 and dated 1786, also has an additional feature that eliminates the need to re-cock and prime the lock. A hybrid of a flintlock and a matchlock, it is provided with a "portfire", which is a section of slow burning cannon fuse held in a small cylinder. The portfire is locked just behind the flintlock mechanism, and is ignited by the flintlock upon firing a shot. With a burn time of up to a minute, the fuse is then slid backwards along the breech section with subsequent trigger pulls, allowing the fuse to ignite the remaining charges as fast as the trigger could be pulled. If the fuse burns out before another shot is needed, the fuse can be replaced, and the flintlock and portfire slid back to the next loaded section of the breech.

The Belton sliding lock design was later improved and used in slightly other designs, such as Isaiah Jenning's repeating flintlock rifle.

=== Four shot pistol design ===
Today there are two surviving Belton and Jover pistols at the Pitt Rivers Museum at the University of Oxford, having four touch holes which permit four successive discharges.
