= Cookson repeater =

Cookson Repeater
- Place of origin: Kingdom of Great Britain

Production history
- Designer: John Cookson
- Designed: 1750 (based on Lorenzoni System 1650)

Specifications
- Cartridge: 0.55 in (1.4 cm)
- Action: lever-action breech-loading
- Feed system: Two-chamber horizontally mounted rotating drum; 7 to 9 shots, depending on model

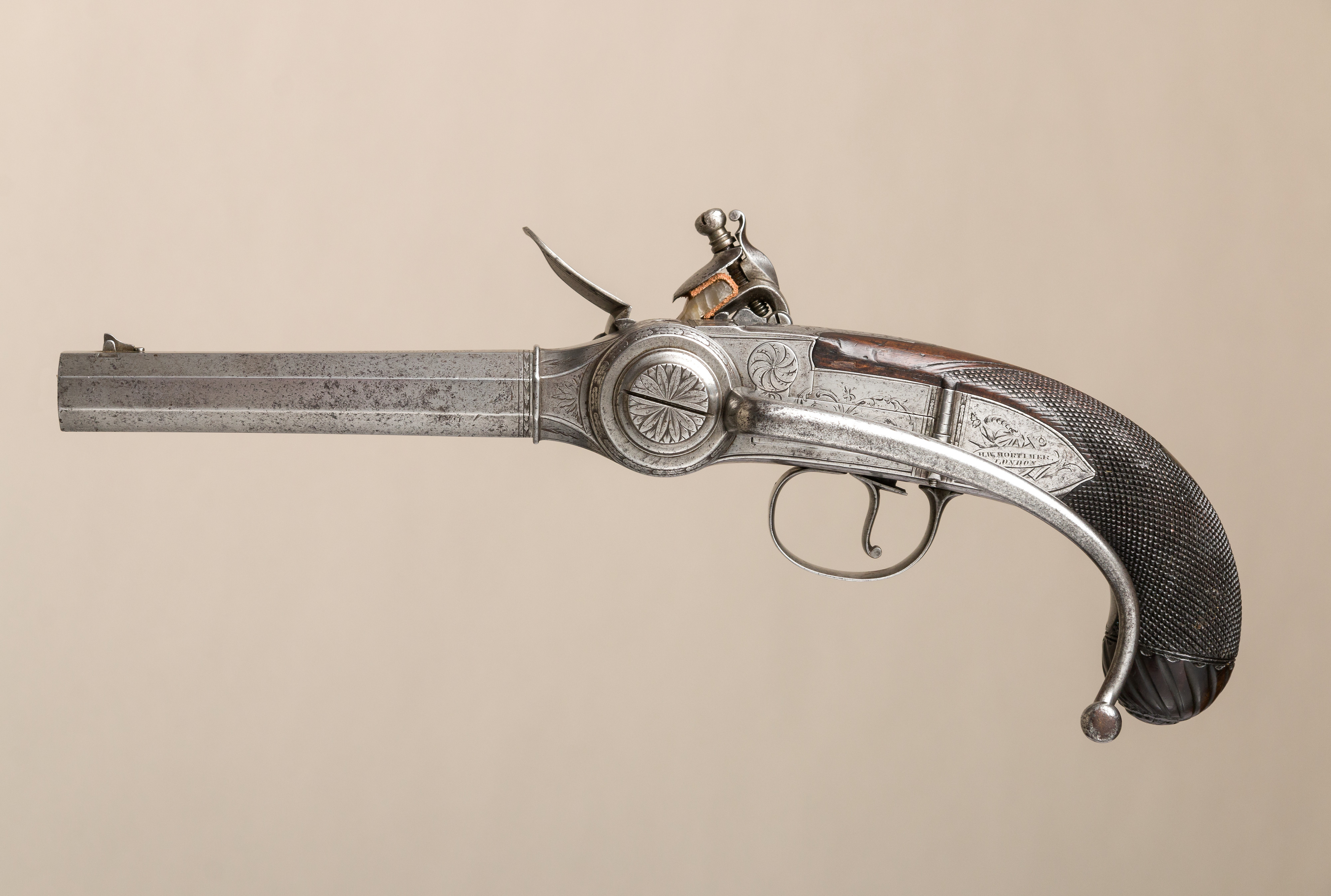
A Cookson gun, bearing the crest of Vice Admiral Horatio Nelson

The Cookson flintlock rifle, a lever-action breech-loading repeater, also known as the Cookson gun, is one of many similar designs to appear beginning in the 17th century. The Victoria & Albert Museum in London has a Cookson Gun, dating to 1690. According to the museum, John Cookson made several repeating guns based on this system. He signed one 'Fecit Londini', which suggests he was a London maker. Another John Cookson, who was also a gunmaker, is known to have worked in America. He is recorded in Boston, Massachusetts between 1701 and 1762. In 1756 he advertised repeating firearms firing nine shots in the local paper, the Boston Gazette. It is probable that he was related to the John Cookson who worked in London.

== Mechanism ==
The mechanism at the heart of the Cookson repeater dates from 1650 and was originally known in Europe as the Lorenzoni System, named for Italian gunsmith Michele Lorenzoni of Florence. Long arms utilizing this system were produced in other European nations and in the United States until about 1849. The Cookson rifle dates from 1750 and features a two-chamber horizontally mounted rotating drum. Loading was accomplished by lowering a lever which was mounted on the left side of the rifle. This caused the chambers to line up with two magazines contained within the buttstock and allowed one .55 caliber lead ball and a 60-grain powder charge to fall into their respective chambers. When the lever was returned to its original position, the ball dropped into the chamber, and the powder charge lined up behind it. At the same time, the hammer was cocked, the pan was primed, and the frizzen was lowered. After firing the rifle, the process could be repeated until the two magazines, with their seven-shot capacities, were empty. While most of these guns used gravity to feed the balls into the drum, one specimen, from the Paris museum, used a spring to force them in. Although other breech loading rifles were introduced in later years, the Cookson-type long arms were unique in their ability to fire multiple shots without reloading. Until the Nineteenth century, the only mechanism that could fire faster was the Kalthoff repeater, which was more delicate and expensive.

However, unlike the Kalthoff, the Cookson system had a dangerous flaw in that flame could leak from the firing chamber into the powder magazine, making the gun explode at high risk to the user. Many of the surviving specimens have shattered stocks from such accidents.
