= Self-loading firearm =

Firearm that can chamber, fire, and automatically eject spent casings in short order

A self-loading firearm is a repeating firearm that can use some of the excess energy released from propellant combustion to cycle its action and facilitate loading of subsequent rounds of ammunition into the chamber, without needing the user to do any extra loading work with their hands.

Depending on whether the action can automatically perform both the loading and ignition procedures, or only automatically load the ammo but require manual actuation of the hammer/striker, self-loading firearms can be categorized into automatic and semi-automatic firearms.

== Categories of self-loading weapons ==
=== Semi-automatic firearm ===
A semi-automatic firearm is a self-loading repeating firearm whose action mechanism automatically loads a following round of cartridge into the chamber and prepares it for subsequent firing, but requires the shooter to manually actuate the trigger in order to discharge each shot. Typically, this involves the weapon's action utilizing the excess energy released during the preceding shot (in the form of recoil or high-pressure gas expanding within the bore) to unlock and move the bolt, extracting and ejecting the spent cartridge case from the chamber, re-cocking the firing mechanism, and loading a new cartridge into the firing chamber, all without input from the user. To fire again, however, the user must actively release the trigger, allow it to "reset", before pulling the trigger again to fire off the next round. As a result, each trigger pull only discharges a single round from a semi-automatic weapon, as opposed to a fully automatic weapon, which will shoot continuously as long as the ammunition is replete and the trigger is kept depressed.

=== Automatic firearm ===
An automatic firearm or fully automatic firearm (to avoid confusion with semi-automatic firearms) is a self-loading repeating firearm that continuously chambers and fires rounds when the trigger mechanism is actuated. The action of an automatic firearm is capable of harvesting the excess energy released from a previous discharge to feed a new ammunition round into the chamber, and then igniting the propellant and discharging the projectile (either bullet, shot, or slug) by delivering a hammer or striker impact on the primer.

If both the feeding and ignition procedures are automatically cycled, the weapon will be considered "fully automatic" and will fire continuously as long as the trigger is kept depressed and the ammunition feeding (either from a magazine or a belt) remains available. In contrast, a firearm is considered "semi-automatic" if it only automatically cycles to chamber new rounds (i.e. self-loading) but does not automatically fire off the shot unless the user manually resets (usually by releasing) and re-actuates the trigger, so only one round gets discharged with each individual trigger-pull.
