= Cocking handle =

Firearm device

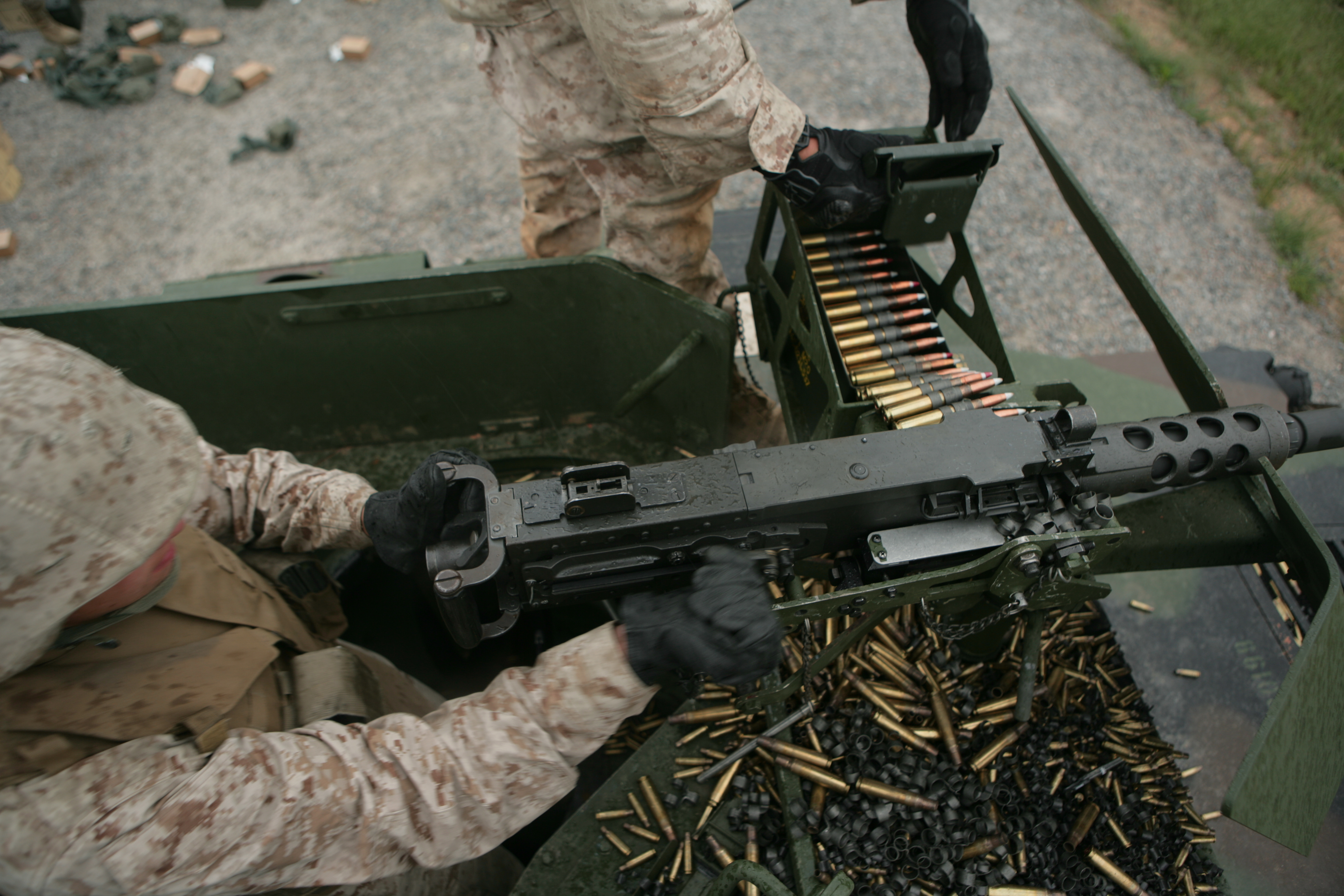
Charging handle being pulled on an M2 machine gun

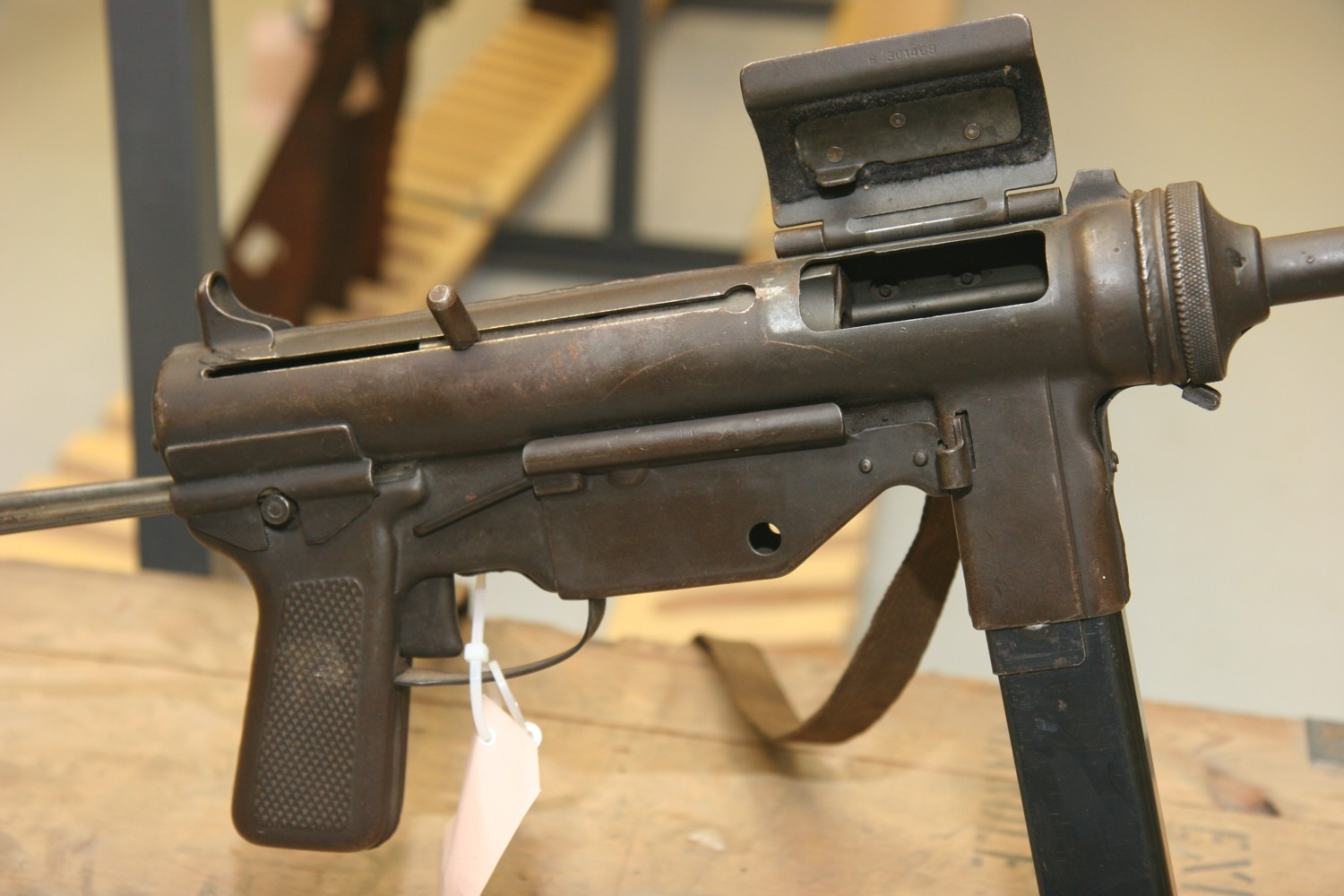
Improvised cocking handle on an M3 submachine gun

The cocking handle, also known as charging handle or bolt handle, is a device on a firearm which, when manipulated, results in the bolt being pulled to the rear, putting the hammer/striker into a spring-loaded ("cocked") "ready and set" position, allowing the operator to open the breech and eject any spent/unwanted cartridge/shell from the chamber, and then load a new round from the magazine or belt if required. By opening the breech, it also helps the operator to verify that the weapon's chamber is clear of any rounds or other obstructions; to clear a stoppage such as a jam, double-feed, stovepipe or misfire; to facilitate moving the bolt back into battery, acting as a forward assist (but not necessarily); and to release a bolt locked to the rear by a catching mechanism on a firearm equipped with a "last round bolt hold open" (LRBHO) feature.

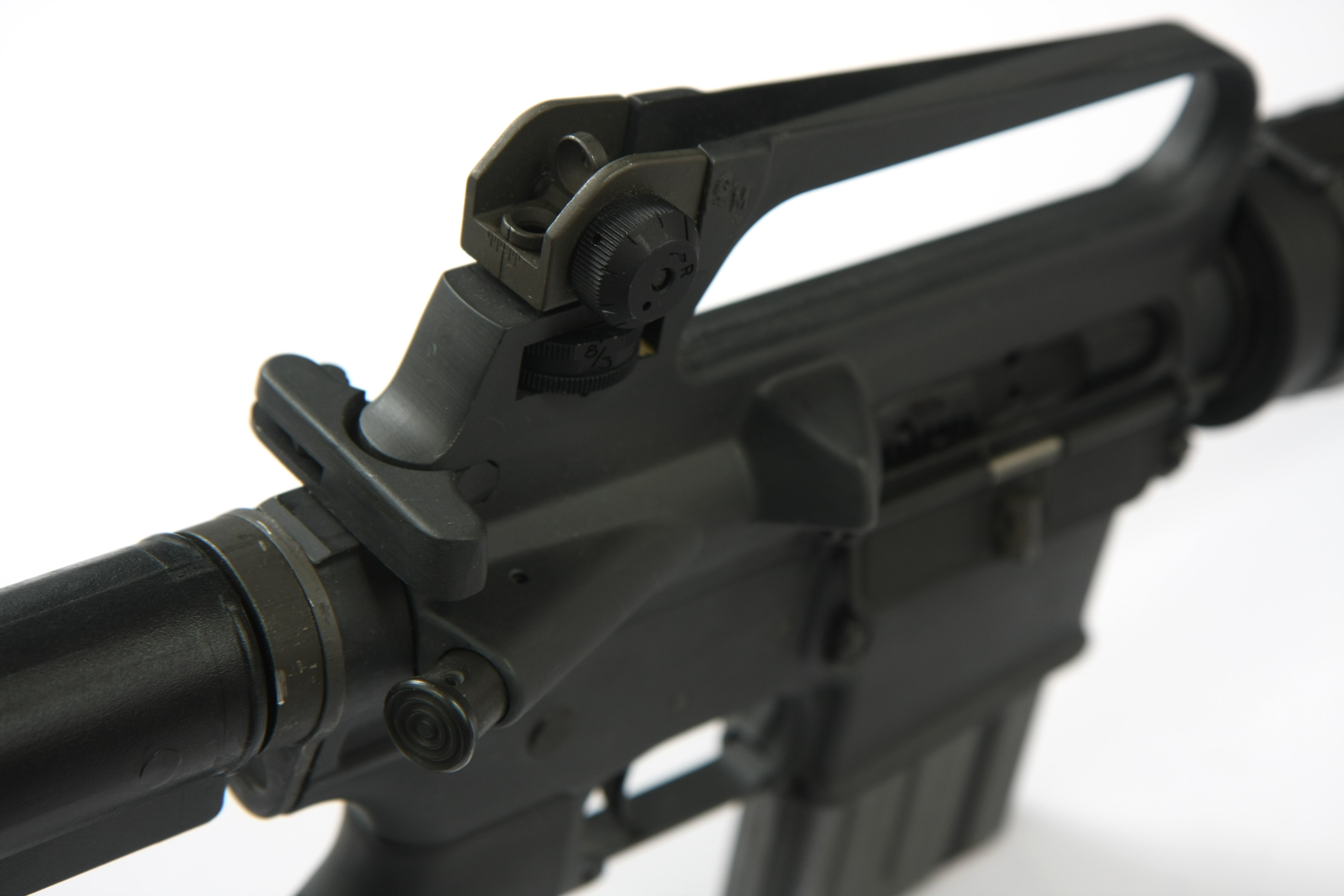
Colt/Armalite - T-shaped charging handle below and behind the rear sight, with the forward assist below and to the right

These devices vary significantly between firearms but may occur in the form of a small protrusion or hook from the side of the bolt, pump, or lever on manual repeating firearms. The slide on a pistol performs a similar action as a cocking handle.

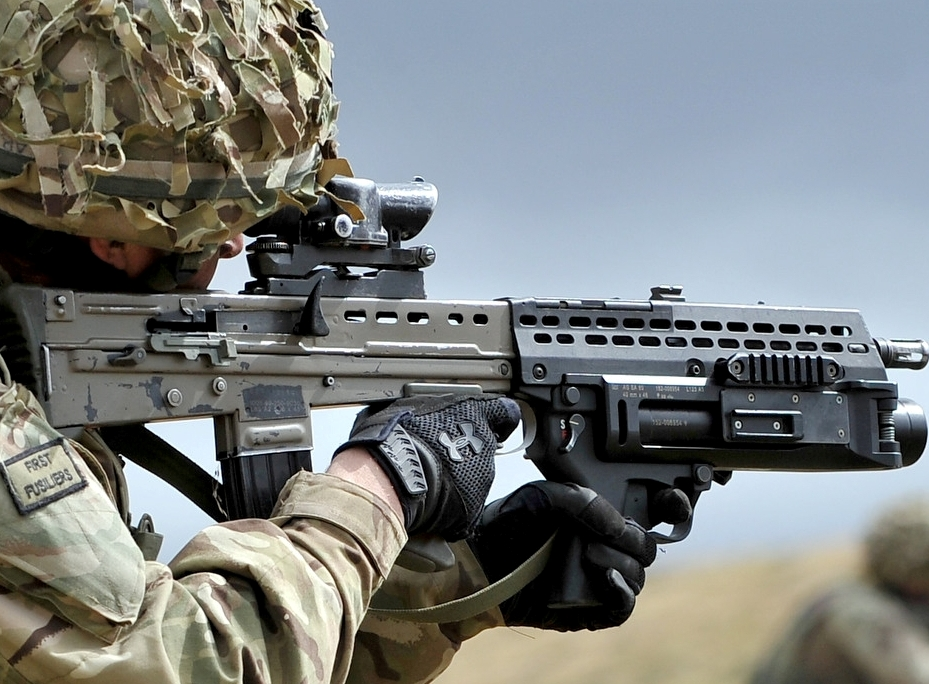
Cocking handle (below the sight) on an L85A2 (SA80 family)

In designing a cocking handle, both durability and ergonomics must be taken into account. When heavily used, repeated motion of the handle can lead to metal fatigue, and to avoid part breakage, designs attempt to increase the mean time between failures. Cocking handles must also be easily and comfortably gripped by the hand of a weapon's operator, including when the operator is wearing gloves or other protective equipment which may limit their dexterity. An example of this ergonomic design can be seen in the thumb grooves found on the cocking handles of the British SA80 family of rifles; these provide extra grip when charging the weapon, preventing the bolt from slipping out of the operator's grip before it is fully pulled back.

Cocking handles may or may not reciprocate along with the action of the firearm. The advantage of a reciprocating handle is that it gives the user complete control over the movement of the bolt and bolt carrier. It enables great force to be used to chamber or extract difficult or ruptured cartridges. However, it adds an extra, fast-moving part on the outside of the gun and may limit the way the gun is handled. Some sources reserve the terms "bolt handle" and "charging handle" for reciprocating and non-reciprocating handles respectively.

== Hammer/striker cocker ==
A similar device on handguns with single-action triggers such as the H&K P7 and the Shevchenko PSh is used as an alternative to double-action triggers to cock the hammer/striker.

== See also ==
- Glossary of firearms terms
- Bolt knob
