= Repeating firearm =

Firearm designed for multiple firings

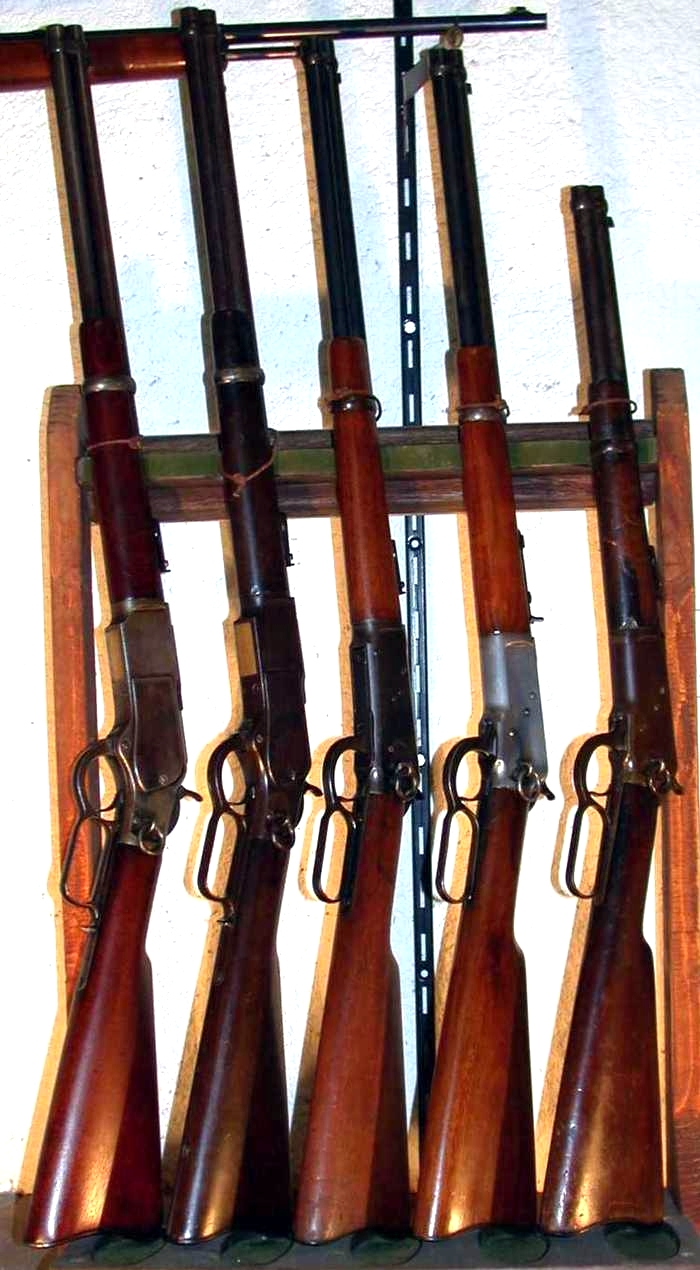
Five Winchester rifles, a type of repeating firearm

A repeating firearm or repeater is any firearm (either a handgun or long gun) that is designed for multiple, repeated firings before the gun has to be reloaded with new ammunition.

Unlike single-shot firearms, which can only hold and fire a single round of ammunition, a repeating firearm can store multiple cartridges inside a magazine (as in pistols, rifles, or shotguns), a cylinder (as in revolvers), or a belt (as in machine guns), and uses a moving action to manipulate each cartridge into and out of the battery position (within the chamber and in alignment with the bore). This allows the weapon to be discharged repeatedly in relatively quick succession, before manually reloading the ammunition is needed.

Typically the term "repeaters" refers to the more ubiquitous single-barreled variants. Multiple-barrel firearms such as derringers, pepperbox guns, double-barreled shotguns/rifles, combination guns, and volley guns can also hold and fire more than one cartridge (one in each chamber of every barrel) before needing to be reloaded, but do not use magazines for ammunition storage and also lack any moving actions to facilitate ammunition-feeding, which makes them technically just bundled assemblies of multiple single-shot barrels fired in succession and/or simultaneously, therefore they are not considered true repeating firearms despite their functional resemblance. On the contrary, rotary-barrel firearms (e.g. Gatling guns), though also multi-barreled, do use belts and/or magazines with moving actions for feeding ammunition, which allow each barrel to fire repeatedly just like any single-barreled repeater, and therefore still qualify as a type of repeating firearm from a technical view point.

Although repeating flintlock breechloading firearms (e.g. the Lorenzóni repeater, Cookson repeater, and Kalthoff repeater) had been invented as early as the 17th century, the first repeating firearms that received widespread use were revolvers and lever-action repeating rifles in the latter half of the 19th century. These were a significant improvement over the preceding single-shot breechloading guns, as they allowed a much greater rate of fire, as well as a longer interval between reloads for more sustained firing, and the widespread use of metallic cartridges also made reloading these weapons quicker and more convenient. Revolvers became very popular sidearms since its introduction by the Colt's Patent Firearms Manufacturing Company in the mid-1830s, and repeating rifles saw use in the early 1860s during the American Civil War. Repeating pistols were first invented during the 1880s, and became widely adopted in the early 20th century, with important design contributions from inventors such as John Browning and Georg Luger.

The first repeating gun to see military service was actually not a firearm, but an airgun. The Girardoni air rifle, designed by Italian inventor Bartolomeo Girardoni circa 1779 and more famously associated with the Lewis and Clark Expedition into the western region of North America during the early 19th century, it was one of the first guns to make use of a tubular magazine.

== Early repeaters ==
- Multiple-barrel firearm
- Revolver (15th century)
- Superposed load (1558)
- Volley gun (1570s)
- Breechloader (16th century)
- Kalthoff repeater (about 1630)
- Cookson repeater (about 1650)
- Blowback and Recoil operation (1663)
- Chelembron system (1668)
- Lagatz rifle: a modification of the Lorenzoni System, designed by Danzig gunsmith Daniel Lagatz around the year 1700.
- Puckle gun (1718)
- Pepper-box (1739)
- Harmonica gun (1742)
- Fafting/Fasting rifle: In 1774 a rifle was invented by a Norwegian or Danish colonel by the name of Fafting or Fasting capable of firing 18 to 20 shots a minute and being used as an ordinary rifle by taking off a spring-loaded container attached to the gun's lock. It was also stated that the inventor was working on a gun capable of firing up to 30 times in a minute on more or less the same principles.
- Belton flintlock (1777)
- Girandoni air rifle (1779)
- Break Action Flintlock (18th century)
- Boxlock action (1782)
- 1789 French rifle: In 1791 it was mentioned in a book published in France that there existed since at least 1789 a rifle that held 5 or 6 shots and was capable of being reloaded three times in a minute for a total of 15 or 18 shots a minute. A rifle similar in type to this was also stated to be kept at the Hotel de la Guerre(fr).
- Joseph Manton's shotguns (1790s)
- Church and Bartemy/Bartholomew gun: A repeating rifle designed by the Americans William Church and Chrostus Bartemy or Bartholomew in 1813 with three separate magazines for containing up to 42 charges of ammunition and capable of firing 25 shots a minute. It could be reloaded in one minute.
- Thomson rifle: a flintlock repeating rifle patented in 1814, using multiple breeches to obtain repeating fire.
- Leroy rifle: In 1815 (sometimes incorrectly dated as 1825) a French inventor called Julien Leroy patented a flintlock and percussion revolving rifle with a mechanically indexed cylinder and a priming magazine.
- Collier's flintlock revolver (1818)
- Lepage guns: In 1819 a French gunsmith called Lepage invented and presented at the French industrial exposition of that year percussion 2-shot and 4-shot turn-over rifles. In 1823 he exhibited a volley rifle that fired 7 rifled barrels simultaneously as well as a turn-over carbine. In 1827, the same inventor exhibited at another French industrial exposition 11 percussion and 1 flintlock firearms which included a 4-shot turn-over rifle, a 'double rifle' with a cylinder with 5 charges and a 'single rifle' and a pair of pistols also with a cylinder with 5 charges. These latter guns were likely derived from Collier’s revolver, who took out a French patent for them in 1819 and licensed Lepage to construct them for him.
- Sutherland magazine pistol: In 1821 the British gunmakers R and R Sutherland advertised for auction, amongst a variety of firearms, a single-barrelled six-shot magazine pistol.
- Pirmet-Baucheron revolving rifle: In 1822 a French gunsmith called Pirmet-Baucheron presented a revolving rifle with 7 shots and a single lock.
- British magazine pistol: A pistol advertised for auction in Britain in 1823 that was said to load and prime itself and could be fired 10 times in a minute.
- Hewson magazine gun: In 1824 an English gunsmith called W. P. Hewson advertised, amongst other firearms and one air gun, a magazine gun.
- Jobard rifle: a turret rifle with 14 shots patented in Belgium in 1826 and presented to the government in 1835.
- Pottet-Delcusse rifle: In 1827 a French gunsmith received an award at an exposition for a four-shot breech-loading rifle.
- Henry rifle: a French 14 shot flintlock rifle in the style of the Kalthoff and Lorenzoni rifles patented in 1831 (granted in 1835) by Francois-Antoine Henry though possibly based on an earlier design published in 1809 by the same author.
- Baker pistols: In 1833 an English gunsmith called T. H. Baker advertised one, two, four, five and seven shot pistols for sale.
- Kavanagh pistols: In 1834 a variety of pistols were exhibited by the Irish gunsmith William Kavanagh, one of which had a 'revolving breech' capable of firing 7 or 8 times, invented by a clergyman called Robert Carey, as well as a 'self-loading pistol'.
- Devisme guns: A French gunsmith called Devisme claimed to have invented a double-action revolver around the time the Collier revolver was patented and to have produced a cartridge revolver using non-obturating steel cartridges that could be swapped out for a cylinder using caps and balls at the user's discretion in 1834 as well as having made to order and sold a seven-shot revolving rifle to 'an Arab chief' in 1835. Furthermore, Devisme presented a variety of firearms at a national exhibition in 1840 which included a pistol with a 'turning barrel' capable of firing 5 separate and successive times. In 1842 the same gunsmith would present a double-action revolving rifle for the French Academy of Sciences which was compared favourably with the revolving rifle invented by another French inventor called Philippe Mathieu around the same time. This rifle also came with a cylinder that could be swapped out in 3 seconds, according to the inventor. Also in 1842 Devisme would demonstrate at the French Industrial Exposition of that year, amongst other firearms, a rifle with a 'turning barrel', no lock and 8 shots, another rifle with 6 shots and one barrel, and two revolving pistols with 5 and 8 shots each. In 1844 at the French Industrial Exposition of that year Devisme would again demonstrate more repeating firearms including an 18 shot pistol described as a 'shapeless mass' with no visible hammer or lock and actuated solely by the pressure of the finger, a 6 shot pistol with percussion hammer, a rifle with 6 shots and a 'revolving breech' and a 4 shot 'double acting' rifle.
- Olive pistol: In 1835 it was mentioned in a French periodical that a French inventor called Jean-Francois-Augustin Olive who was seeking funds for developing a breech-loading, 8-shot pistol into a 30-shot version had been arrested.
- Osterried guns: In 1835 it was mentioned in a French newspaper that an Osterried of Bavaria had invented a rifle and 3 different kinds of pistols, the first of which had 2 barrels and 4 hammers for firing 4 successive shots, the second of which had one barrel and 6 'mouths', no hammer and was actuated by the trigger and the third of which had 8 'mouths' and could be fired 16 successive times. In response to this announcement it was mentioned in an Austrian newspaper that similar inventions had already been known in their country for a long time and used as an example a pistol invented a few years prior to the announcement of Osterried's inventions by the head gunsmith of the local imperial armoury called Ulrich which was claimed to be able to fire 14 successive times from 7 barrels which were all loaded at once and could fit comfortably inside a user's pocket.
- Irish Magazine pistol: In 1836 a magazine pistol was advertised for auction in Ireland.
- Silas Day magazine gun: A percussion revolving rifle to which was attached a loose-powder-and-ball magazine patented in the US in 1837.
- Colt ring lever rifles (1837)
- Bailey, Ripley and Smith Magazine rifle: In 1838 the Americans Lebbeus Bailey, John B. Ripley and William B. Smith patented a percussion repeating rifle with a gravity-operated tubular magazine in the stock which could hold up to 15 re-useable steel cartridge-chambers.
- Eaton rifle: In 1838 a percussion rifle invented in America by James Eaton was described as being capable of holding 24 rounds in a rotating magazine and discharging them all in four minutes for a rate of fire of 6 rounds per minute.
- Kratsch rifle: In 1839 it was reported that a mechanic called Kratsch from Bayreuth had invented a rifle capable of firing 30 times in a minute and being reloaded in one minute.
- Branch pistols: In 1842 an English gunsmith called T. Branch advertised two six shot 'self acting' pistols for sale.
- Jennings Magazine rifle: in 1847 Walter Hunt patented in Britain a repeating rifle he called "the Volitional Repeater". He would patent it again in the United States in 1849. This rifle featured a tubular magazine beneath the barrel and a lever mechanism to raise cartridges into the chamber. Unable to finance the building of the rifle, Hunt sold the rights to George Arrowsmith who in turn had an employee, Lewis Jennings, improve the lever mechanism. Courtland Palmer placed the first order for the "Jennings Magazine rifle" for his hardware store: Robbins & Lawrence. The rifle did not sell well as the ammunition was a hollow based bullet containing gunpowder. Most of the guns were later converted to single shot rifles. Two employees working at Robbins & Lawrence: Horace Smith and Daniel B. Wesson improved the design and sold it as the "Smith-Jennings Repeating Rifle". At first they used a slightly modified Flobert cartridge, patented in 1853, but later they would switch to a modified Rocket Ball type of ammunition altered so as to function as a self-contained centerfire cartridge.
- Cass Repeating Belt gun: A percussion repeating rifle patented in 1848 in the US using a chain or belt in the stock which carried paper cartridges to the breech of the gun.
- Buchel Cartridge Magazine gun: The first tubular cartridge magazine gun to be patented in the United States in February 1849.
- Perry 'Faucet-Breech' gun: A hinged or tilting breech repeating rifle patented in the US in December 1849 by Alonzo Perry using paper cartridges contained in several gravity-operated tubular magazines in the stock and a separate magazine for fulminate pills which were used for ignition.
- Porter self-loading gun: In February 1851 a loose-powder-and-ball percussion magazine gun invented by a Parry W. Porter, better known for the turret rifle he invented and to which the magazine for his loose-powder-and-ball gun was to be attached, was reported on in American newspapers and later in the same year a patent was procured by the inventor.
- Needham self-loading carbine: A self-loading carbine demonstrated in June 1851 at the Great Exhibition by Joseph Needham.
- Renette self-loading pocket pistol: A self-loading pocket pistol demonstrated in 1851 at the Great Exhibition in London by the French inventor Gastinne Renette, using cylindro-conoidal bullets.
- Bertonnet self-loading firearm: It is mentioned in Hunt's Handbook to the Official Catalogues of the Great Exhibition of 1851 that a French inventor called Bertonnet demonstrated a self-loading firearm in 1851 at the Great Exhibition though no details are provided.
- Dixon self-loading and self-priming gun: A repeating gun demonstrated by a C. S. Dixon which won a silver award at the Annual Fair of the American Institute in October 1851.
- The first slide action patent: Issued in Britain in 1854, to Alexander Bain who modified the mechanism of a harmonica gun.
- 1854 Lindner revolving rifle: In 1854 the German Edward Lindner patented in the United States and Britain a repeating rifle which used a revolving cylinder to elevate the cartridges, which were paper and could be either self-contained needlefire cartridges or use external percussion caps for ignition, to the breech from a tubular magazine located under the barrel.
- Colette gravity pistol: a repeating saloon gun premiered at the 1855 World's Fair. Despite popularly being known as the Colette Gravity Pistol its original inventor was actually a Belgian called Jean Nicolas Herman.
- Colt revolving rifle (1855)
- Leroux magazine gun: At the Exposition Universelle (1855) in France a French gunsmith called Leroux demonstrated a repeating carbine with a tubular magazine for 36 Flobert cartridges and which featured a novel cartridge extractor.
- Spencer repeating rifle (1860)
- Roper repeating shotgun (1866)

== Mechanisms ==
=== Manual ===
In a manually operated repeating firearm (or "manual repeater" for short), the user needs to manually apply force to the action to operate it, either directly to a handle on the bolt or an external hammer, or indirectly through a linkage connected to a lever or slide.

==== Revolver action ====
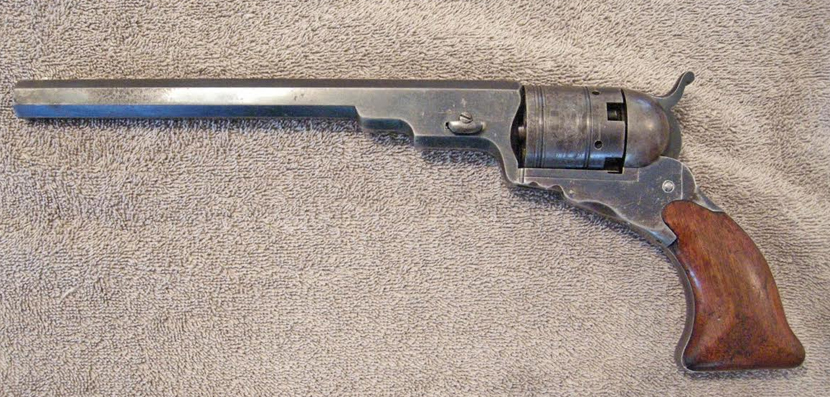
Colt Holster Model Paterson Revolver No. 5

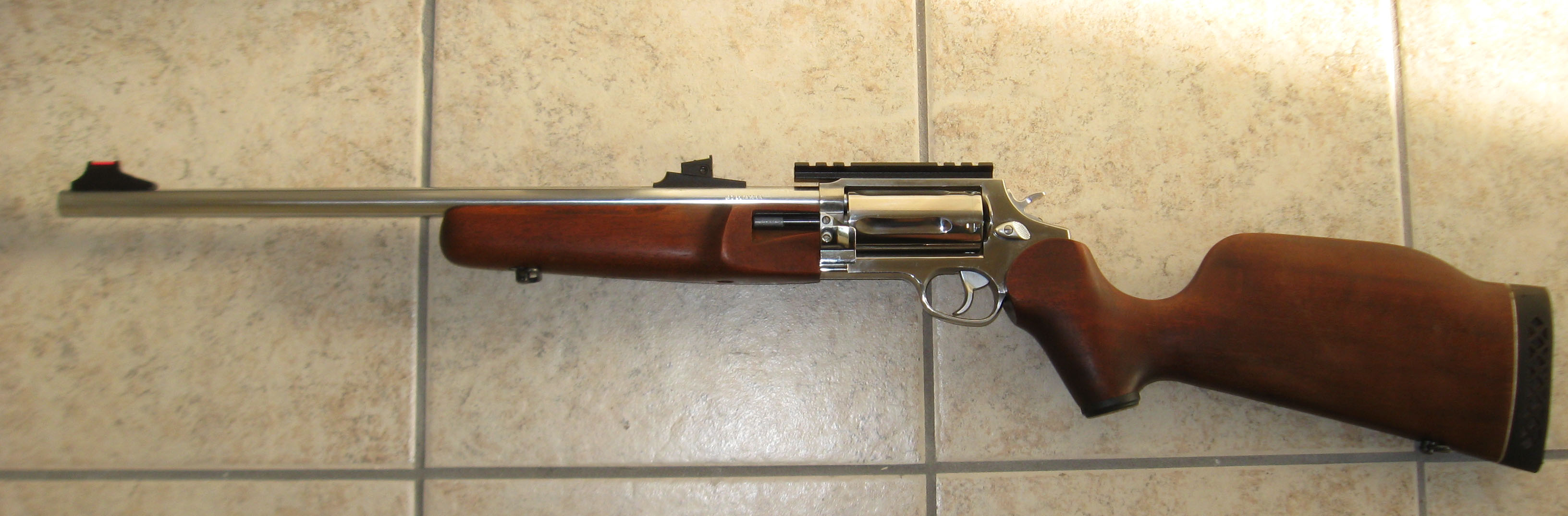
Circuit Judge revolver mechanism carbine

Revolvers use a rotating cylinder containing multiple chambers, which functions similarly to a rotary magazine (with each chamber holding a round of cartridge). When the hammer is cocked (either directly by hand, or indirectly via trigger-pull), internal linkage will rotate the cylinder and index each chamber into alignment with the barrel bore. When firing, the bullet will make a slight "jump" across the gap between the cylinder and the barrel, creating out a small "breech blast" from any hot, high-pressure propellant gas that leaks out of the gap. The breech portion of the bore is also often widened slightly into a funnel-like "cone" to better facilitate the bullet jump across the cylinder gap.

Although multiple-barrel "pepper-box" guns had appeared for centuries and were popular handguns in the early 19th century, the revolver was the first true repeating handgun. In 1836, Samuel Colt applied a patent for a "revolving gun" later named the Colt Paterson; he was granted the patent on 25 February 1836 (later numbered 9430X). This instrument and patent No. 1304, dated 29 August 1836, protected the basic principles of his revolving-breech-loading, folding-trigger firearm and gave him a monopoly of revolver manufacture until 1857. It was the first practical revolver and the first practical repeating firearm, and became an industrial and cultural legacy as well as a contribution to the development of war technology, represented ironically by the name of one of his company's later innovations, the "Peacemaker".

While some early long guns were also made using the revolver mechanism, these did not have longevity as it posed a problem with long guns: without special sealing details, the cylinder produces a gas discharge close to the face when the weapon is fired from the shoulder, as was a common approach with rifles.

The Milkor MGL is a lightweight 40 mm grenade launcher based on a six-shot revolver mechanism designed to significantly increase a squad's firepower when compared to traditional single-shot grenade launchers like the M203. Although intended primarily for military combat, the launcher is also suitable as a riot gun for mob control and other law enforcement operations using tear gas or non-/less-lethal munitions.

==== Revolver cannon ====
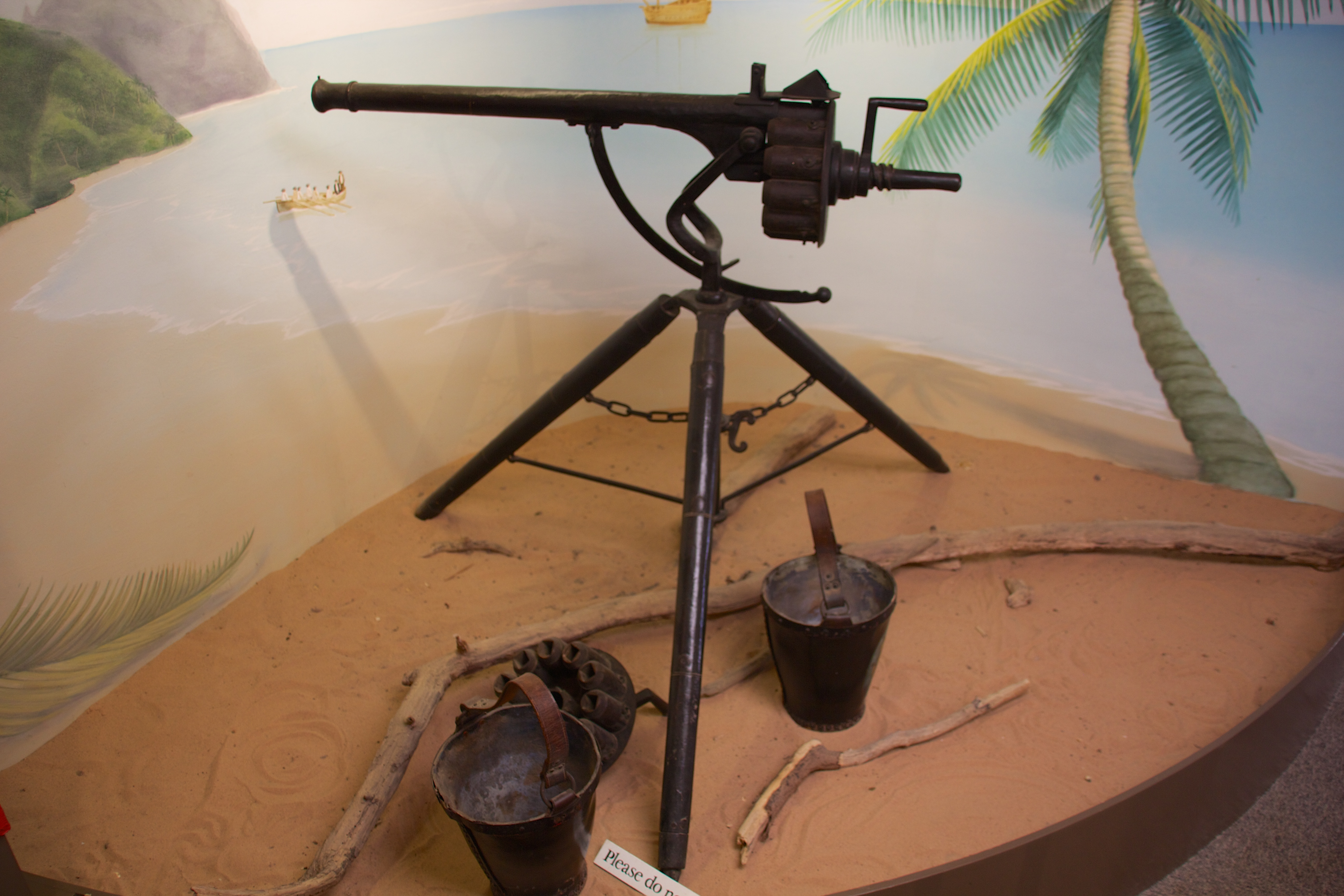
Replica Puckle gun from Buckler's Hard Maritime Museum

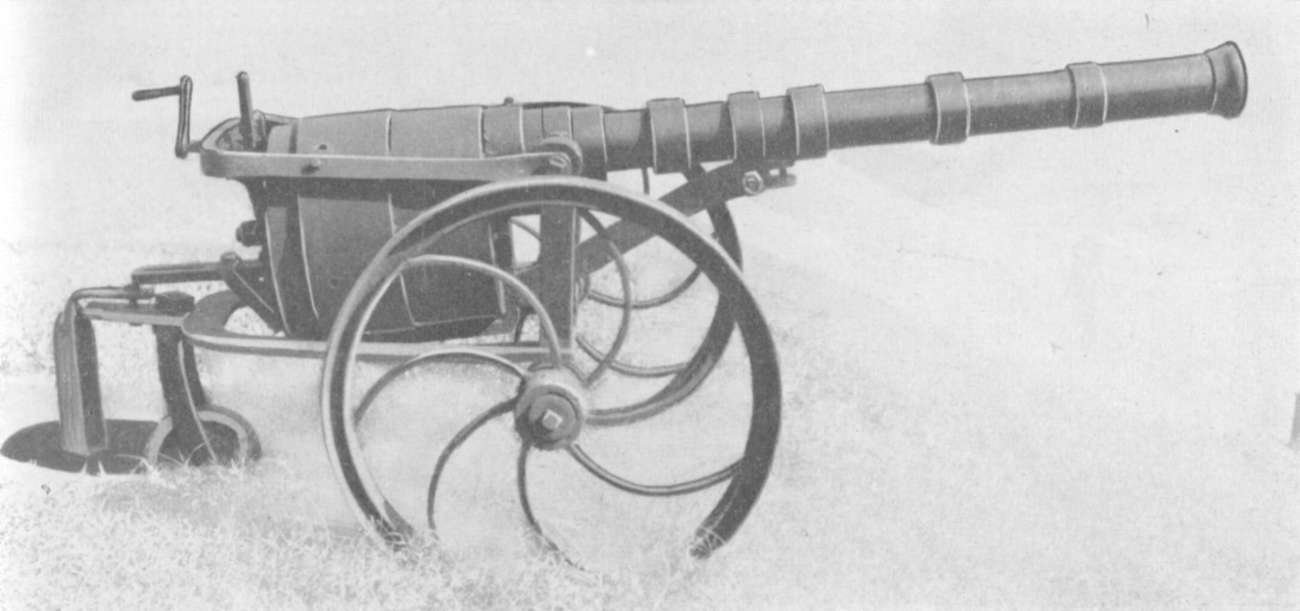
Confederate revolving cannon

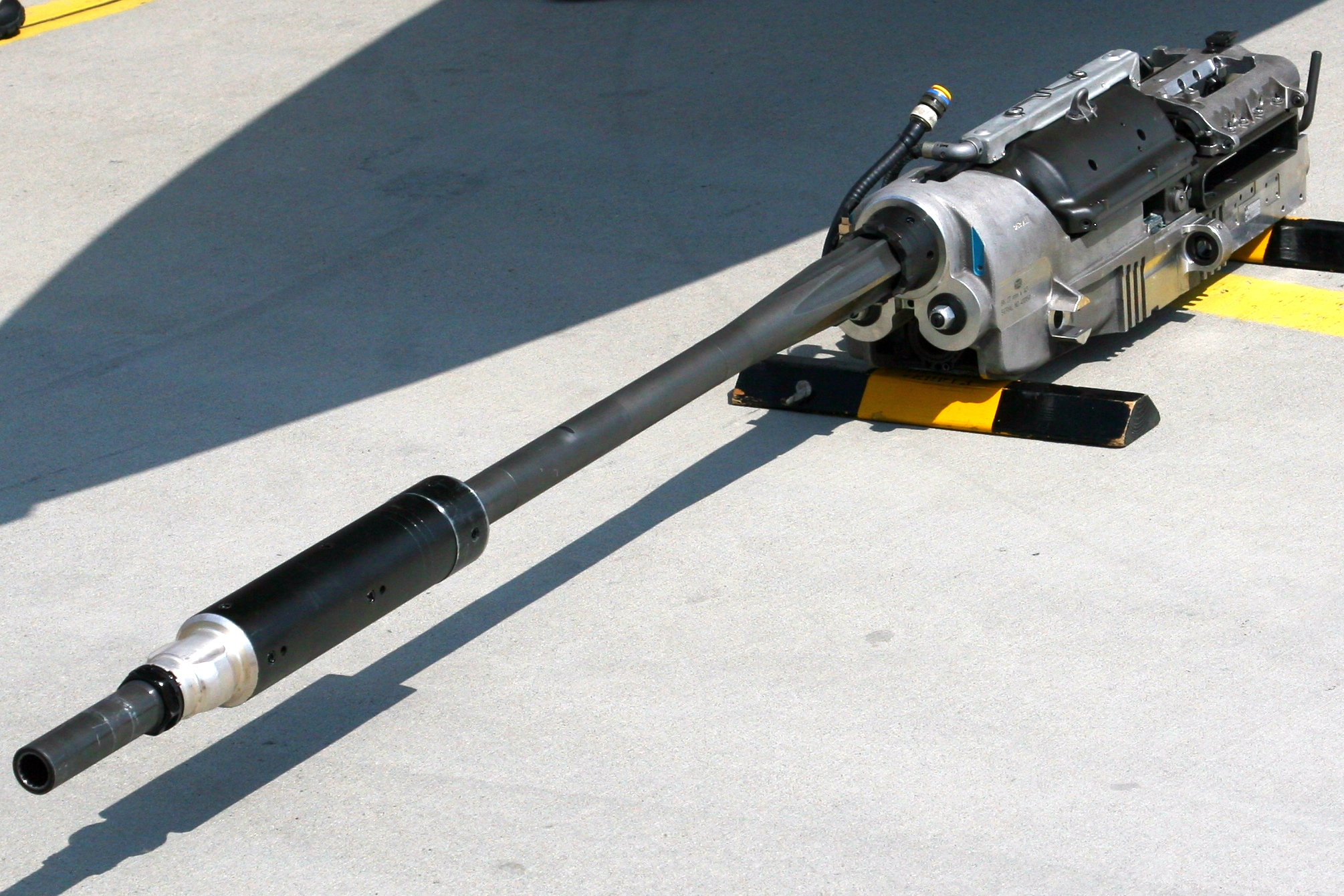
Modern Mauser BK-27 aircraft revolver cannon

A revolver cannon is a large-caliber gun (cannon) that uses a revolver-like cylinder to speed up the loading-firing-ejection cycle. Unlike a rotary cannon, a revolver cannon has only a single gun barrel. An early precursor was the Puckle gun of 1718, a large manually operated flintlock gun, whose design idea was impractical due to it being far ahead of what 18th century technology could achieve. During the 19th century, The Confederate Army used a single 2-inch revolver cannon with 5 manually rotated chambers during the Siege of Petersburg. The gun was captured in Danville, Virginia by the Union Army on 27 April 1865.

Modern revolver cannons are actually automatically operated weapons. In 1905, C. M. Clarke patented the first fully automatic, gas-operated rotary chamber gun, but his design was ignored at the time as it came as reciprocating-bolt automatic weapons like the Maxim gun and the Browning gun were peaking in popularity. In 1932, the Soviet ShKAS machine gun, a 7.62 mm calibre aircraft ordnance, used a twelve-round capacity, revolver-style feeding mechanism with a single barrel and single chamber, to achieve firing rates of well over 1800 rounds per minute, and as high as 3,000 rounds per minute in special test versions in 1939, all operating from internal gas-operated reloading. Some 150,000 ShKAS weapons were produced for arming Soviet military aircraft through 1945. Around 1935, Silin, Berezin and Morozenko worked on a 6000 rpm 7.62 mm aircraft machine gun using revolver design, called SIBEMAS (СИБЕМАС), but the project was abandoned.

It was not until the mid-1940s that the first practical modern revolver cannon emerged. The archetypal revolver cannon is the Mauser MK 213, from which almost all current revolver cannons are derived. In the immediate post-war era, Mauser engineers spread out from Germany and developed similar weapons around the world. Both the British and French made outright copies of the 30 mm versions of the MK 213, as the ADEN and DEFA, respectively. Switzerland produced the Oerlikon KCA. The American M39 cannon used the 20 mm version, re-chambered for a slightly longer 102 mm cartridge, intermediate between the 213's 82 mm and Hispano-Suiza HS.404's 110 mm. Several generations of the basic ADEN/DEFA weapons followed, remaining largely unchanged into the 1970s. Around that time, a new generation of weapons developed, based on the proposed NATO 25 mm caliber standard and the Mauser 27 mm round. A leading example is the Mauser BK-27. In the 1980s, the French developed the GIAT 30, a newer generation power-driven revolver cannon. The Rheinmetall RMK30 modifies the GIAT system further, by venting the gas to the rear to eliminate recoil. Larger experimental weapons have also been developed for anti-aircraft use, like the Anglo-Swiss twin barrel but single chamber 42 mm Oerlikon RK 421 given the code name "Red King" and the related single-barrel "Red Queen" – all of which were cancelled during development. The largest to see service is the Rheinmetall Millennium 35 mm Naval Gun System.

Soviet revolver cannon are less common than Western ones, especially on aircraft. A mechanism for a Soviet revolver-based machine gun was patented in 1944. The virtually unknown Rikhter R-23 was fitted only to some Tu-22 models, but later abandoned in favor of the two-barrel, Gast gun Gryazev-Shipunov GSh-23 in the Tu-22M. The Rikhter R-23 does have the distinction of being fired from the space station Salyut 3. The Soviet navy has also adopted a revolver design, the NN-30, typically in a dual mount in the AK-230 turret.

==== Lever-action ====
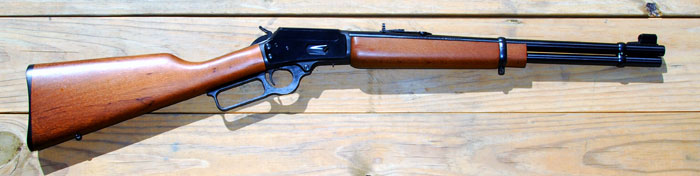
Marlin Model 1894C lever-action carbine in .357 Magnum caliber

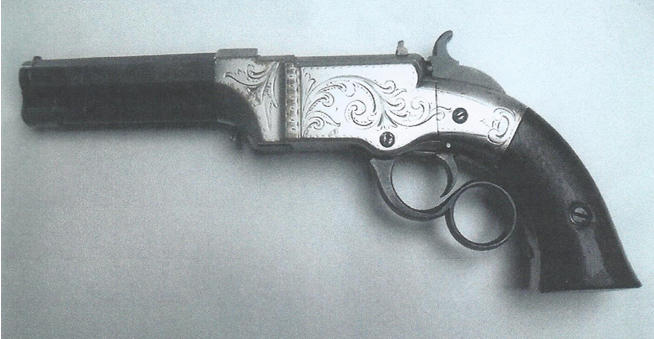
A Volcanic lever-action pistol

In a classic Henry–Winchester type lever-action firearm, cartridges are loaded tandemly into a tubular magazine below the barrel. A short bolt is manipulated via linkage to a pivoted cocking lever. Once closed, an over-center toggle action helps locking the bolt in place and prevents the breech from opening accidentally when the weapon is fired. The cocking lever is often integral with the trigger guard, and gets manually flexed down and forward when operated. An interlock prevents firing unless the toggle is fully closed. The famous Model 1873 Winchester is exemplary of this type. Later lever-action designs, such as Marlin lever guns and those designed for Winchester by John Browning, use one or two vertical locking blocks instead of a toggle-link. There also exist lever-action rifle/shotguns that feed from a box magazine, which allows them to use pointed bullets. Some of the early manual repeating pistols (e.g. Volcanic pistol) also use a scaled-down version of lever-action.

A one-off example of lever-action loading on an automatic firearm is the M1895 Colt–Browning machine gun. This weapon had a swinging lever beneath its barrel that was actuated by a gas bleed in the barrel, unlocking the breech to reload. This unique operation gave the nickname "potato digger" as the lever swung each time the weapon fired.

==== Pump-action ====
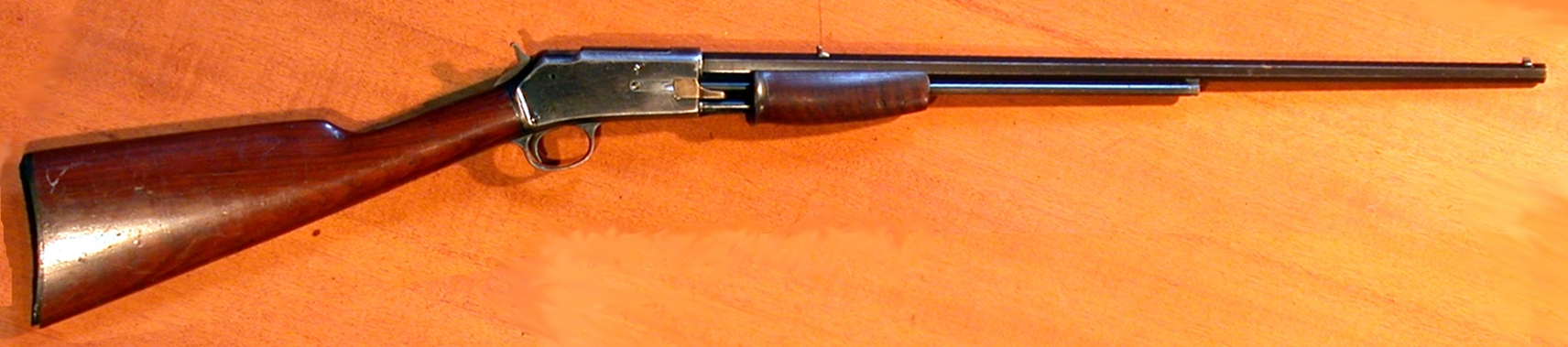
The Colt Lightning .22 pump action rifle

With a pump-action firearm, the action is operated by sliding a movable handguard on the fore-end backward and forward, with manipulated the bolt via linkage to eject a spent round, and extract and chamber a fresh round of ammunition. Pump-actions are usually associated with shotguns, but an example of a pump-action rifle is the Remington Model 7600 series. This type of rifle is still popular with some local law enforcement branches as it is easier to train police officers who are already familiar with a pump-action shotgun.

==== Bolt-action ====
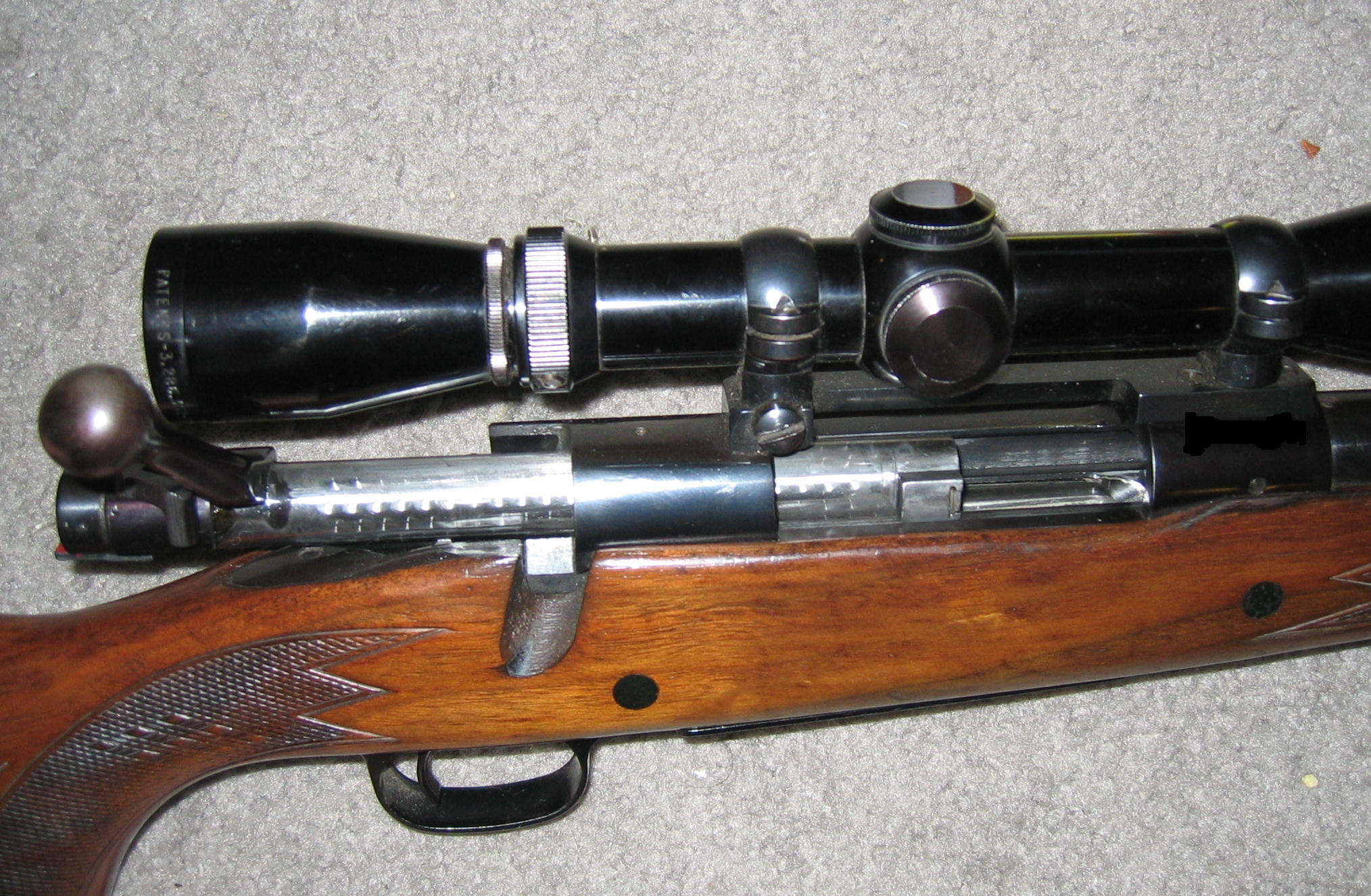
Opened bolt on a Winchester Model 70, with an engine turned finish

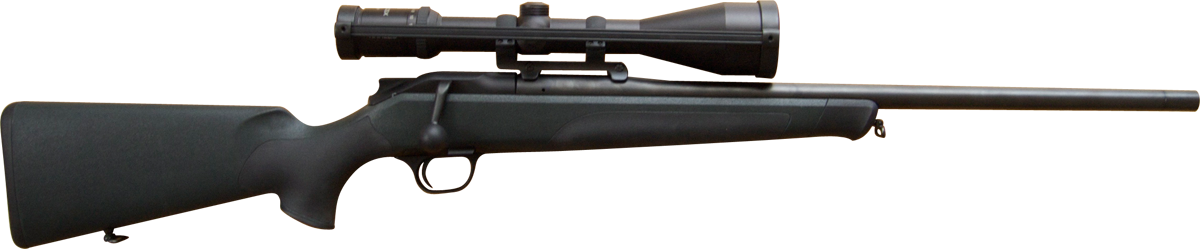
Blaser R8 Professional straight-pull rifle

In bolt-action firearms, the bolt is operated by directly gripping a bolt handle (usually on the right side) to extract spent cartridges case, push new rounds into the chamber and reset the hammer/striker to ready the weapon for firing again.

Most bolt-action firearms use a rotating-bolt ("turn-and-pull") design. When the bolt is closed against the breech end of the gun barrel, it is locked onto the receiver via protruded lugs (usually on the bolt head) and occasionally also aided by the bolt handle that fits into a notch. To unlock the bolt, the handle must be rotated upwards first, which will shift the locking lugs out of their corresponding sockets. This allows the bolt to then be physically pulled rearwards, opening the barrel breech. An extractor on the bolt will hook onto the rim and pull out any cartridge (either fired or unused) remaining in the chamber, allowing it to be ejected from the gun. When the bolt is fully pulled to the rearmost position, the hammer/striker will get loaded against a spring and trapped by the sear, a process known as cocking. At the same time, the magazine will lift another round of its stored cartridges up into the path of the bolt head, so moving the bolt forward will push this new round into the chamber. The bolt handle is then rotated downward for relocking, the gun is safe and ready for another firing. The Mauser Gewehr 98 rifle is the most famous and influential bolt-action design, with many similar weapons derived from its pioneering design concept, such as the Karabiner 98 Kurz (abbreviated often as Kar98k or simply K98), the M1903 Springfield and the Arisaka Type 38 rifles. The Russian Mosin–Nagant rifle, the British Lee–Enfield, and the Norwegian Krag–Jørgensen are examples of alternate bolt-action designs.

Another much rarer type of bolt-action is the straight-pull system, which uses complex bolt head mechanisms to facilitate locking. Straight-pull designs do not require the bolt handle to be rotated, allowing the user to cycle the action linearly, reducing the movements needed from originally four to only two, therefore significantly increasing the rate of fire. Examples of such firearms include the Schmidt–Rubin, Mannlicher M1886/M1888/M1890/M1895, M1895 Lee Navy, Ross rifle, Anschütz 1827 Fortner, Blaser R93/R8 and VKS.

=== Autoloading ===
Self-loading (or autoloading) repeating firearms can use some of the excess energy released from propellant combustion to cycle its action and facilitate loading of subsequent rounds of ammunition into the chamber, without needing the user to do any extra loading work with his hands. Depending on whether the action can automatically perform both the loading and ignition procedures, or only automatically load the ammo but require manual actuation of the hammer/striker, self-loading repeaters can be categorized into fully automatic and semi-automatic firearms.

==== Blowback ====
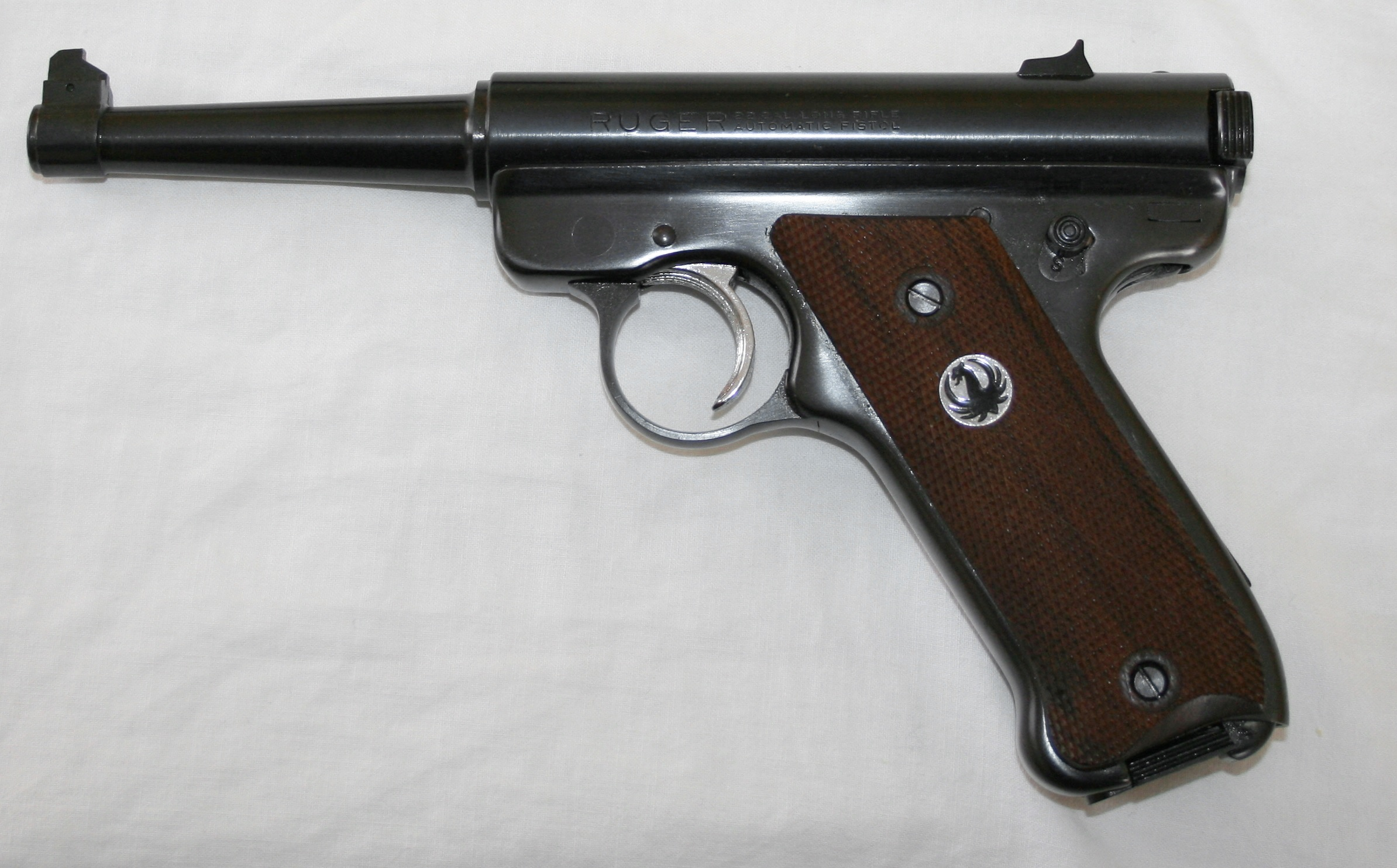
Ruger Standard (Mark I)

In blowback operation, the bolt is not actually locked at the moment of firing. To prevent violent recoil, in most firearms using this mechanism the opening of the bolt is delayed in some way. In many small arms, the round is fired while the bolt is still travelling forward, and the bolt does not open until this forward momentum is overcome. Other methods involve delaying the opening until two rollers have been forced back into recesses in the receiver in which the bolt is carried. Simple blowback action is simple and inexpensive to manufacture, but is limited in the power it can handle, so it is seen on small caliber weapons such as machine pistols and submachine guns. Lever-delayed blowback, as seen in for example the French FAMAS assault rifle, can also handle more powerful cartridges but is more complicated and expensive to manufacture.

==== Blow-forward ====
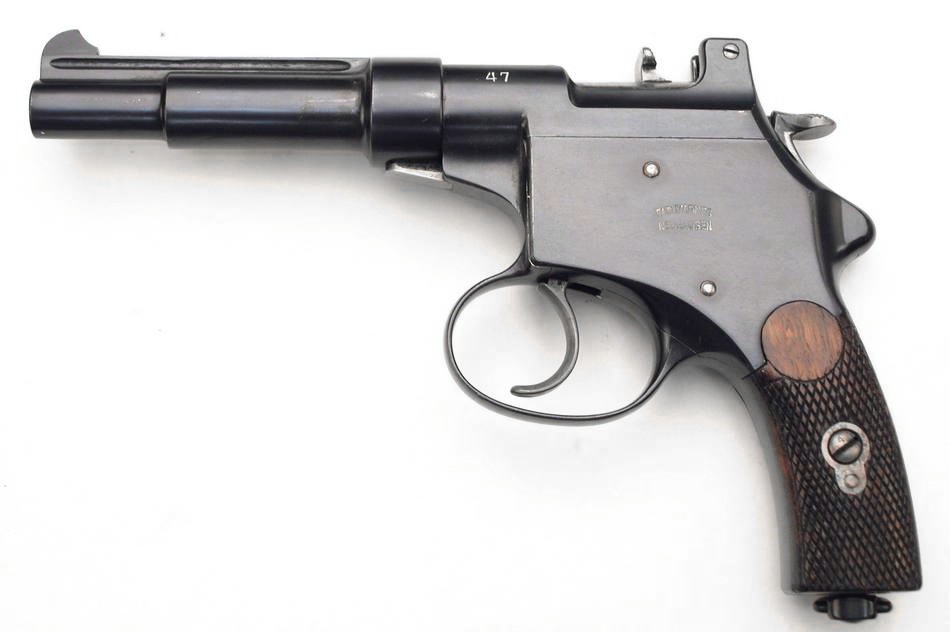
The Mannlicher M1894

Blow-forward firearms incorporates a frame with a fixed breech face and the barrel moves away from the breech (frame) during the cycle of operation, in contrast to blowback firearms, which have the frame fixed to the barrel and the breech face moves in relation to the frame. The breech face is a part of the moving slide or bolt, depending on the layout of the blowback firearm. During firing, the friction of the bullet traveling down the barrel and the bore pressure pulls the barrel forward. This mechanism contains a minimum of moving parts (the barrel and spring are generally the only moving parts) and is more compact than other operating mechanism of equal barrel length. However, due to the reduced mass of rear-moving parts coupled with the increased mass of the forward-moving parts (the barrel plus the bullet and propellant gasses), recoil energy is significantly greater than other operating mechanisms. Most blow-forward guns rely partially on the inertia of the barrel as the rest of the firearm recoil away from it.

The first blow-forward firearm was the Mannlicher M1894 pistol and protected under U.S. patent 581,296. The principle has been used in a few other weapons, including Schwarzlose Model 1908, Hino Komuro M1908, HIW VSK, Mk 20 Mod 0 grenade launcher, Pancor Jackhammer and Howa Type 96.

==== Recoil-operated ====
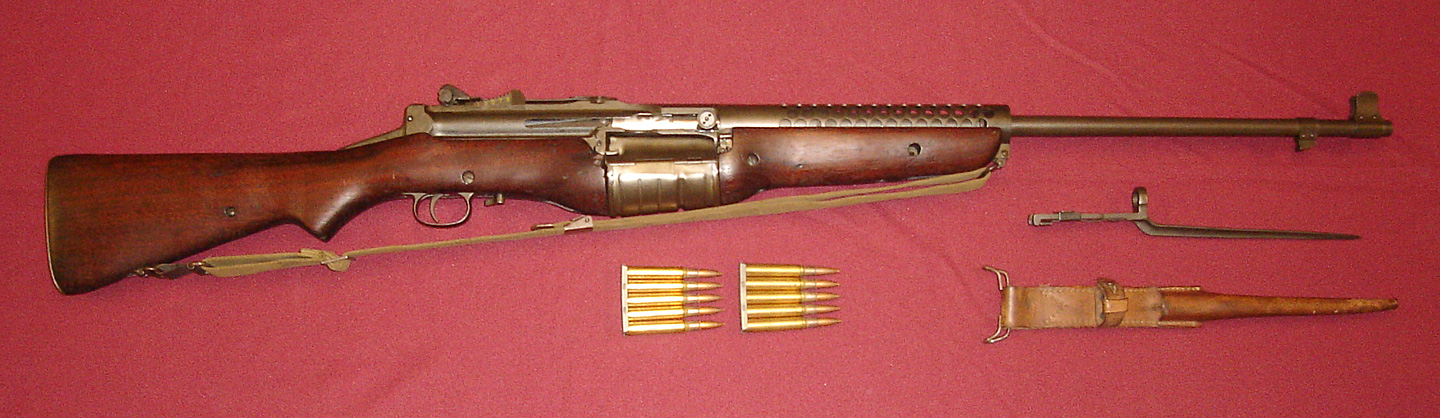
M1941 Johnson rifle

In a recoil-operated firearm, the breech is locked, and the barrel recoils as part of the firing cycle. In long-recoil actions, such as the Browning Auto-5 shotgun, the barrel and breechblock remain locked for the full recoil travel, and separate on the return; in short-recoil actions, typical of most semiautomatic handguns (e.g. the Colt M1911), the barrel recoils only a short distance before decoupling from the breechblock.

==== Gas-operated ====
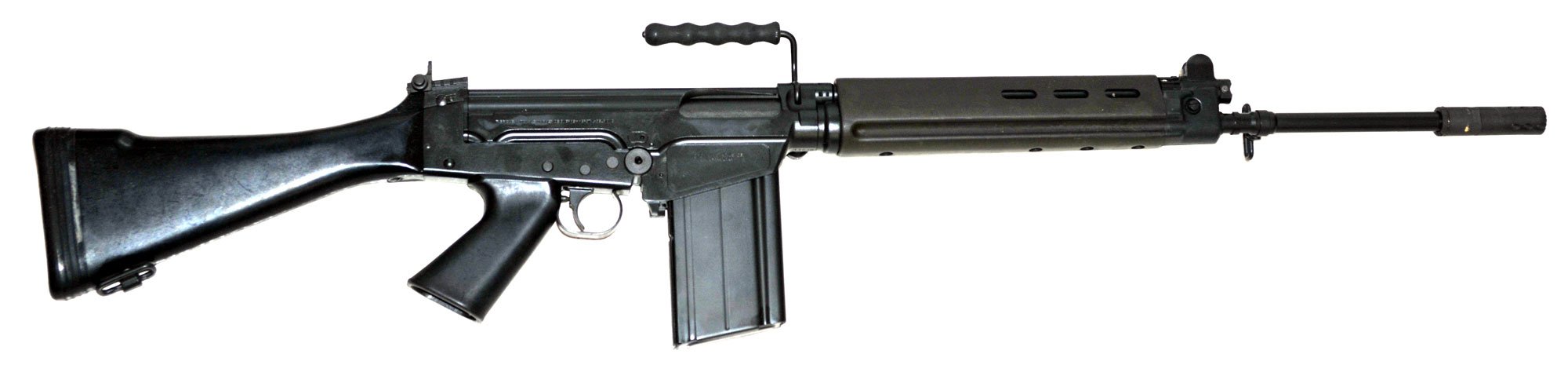
FN FAL battle rifle

In a gas-operated mechanism, a portion of the gases propelling the bullet from the barrel are extracted and used to operate a piston. The motion of this piston in turn unlocks and operates the bolt, which performs extraction of the spent cartridge and via spring action readies the next round. Almost all modern military rifles use mechanisms of this type.

=== Rotary-barrel ===
Rotary-barrel firearms (or rotary guns for short) uses multiple paraxial barrels in a rotating assembly, with each barrel firing automatically when rotated to a designated position, to achieve a rate of fire proportional to the speed of the barrel rotation. Rotary guns are typically belt-fed, though the earlier versions used top-mounted box magazines. Each barrel is paired with a cam-driven reciprocating action, so every barrel-action group is technically an independent repeater unit whose operating status corresponds to its rotational position within the assembly, and at any moment all the groups are at different stages of operating cycle to each other. Due to their capability to tolerate extremely rapid-firing (much higher than single-barreled automatic weapons of the same caliber), rotary guns are frequently used to deliver direct saturation fire for suppression and area denial. Early rotary guns are manually powered, and though quite successful at the time, was largely replaced from the battlefield before the turn of the 20th century by newer and more reliable machine guns such as the Maxim gun, but made a comeback during the Cold War in the form of automatic rotary cannons.

One of the main reasons for the resurgence of these electrically/hydraulically powered multiple-barrel guns is the system's inherent tolerance for continuous high rates of fire. For example, 1000 rounds per minute of continuous fire from a conventional single-barrel weapon ordinarily results in rapid barrel overheating followed by action stoppages caused also by overheating; in contrast, a five-barreled rotary gun firing 1000 rounds per minute endures only 200 rounds per minute for each barrel. The other factor is that while single-barrel designs can achieve high cycling rates, each loading-extraction cycle can only commence after the previous cycle is physically complete, or else the system will jam mechanically, and the risk of such malfunction increases exponentially with increasingly higher cycling rates; a multiple-barrel design however allows multiple barrel-action groups to work simultaneously in overlapped, differentially timed cycles, thus diffusing the operational stress of each action into the duration of an entire barrel rotation (which is multitudes more than the cycle time of a single-barrel automatic firearm with the same firing rate). The design also solves the problem of defective ammunition, which can cause a typical single-barrel machine gun to cease operation when a cartridge fails to load, fire or eject; as a rotary gun is normally powered by an external power source, the barrel rotation will continue independently, ejecting any defective rounds indifferently as part of the operational cycle, and the firing will merely experience a brief pause for that non-firing barrel before resuming to usual firing with other barrels.

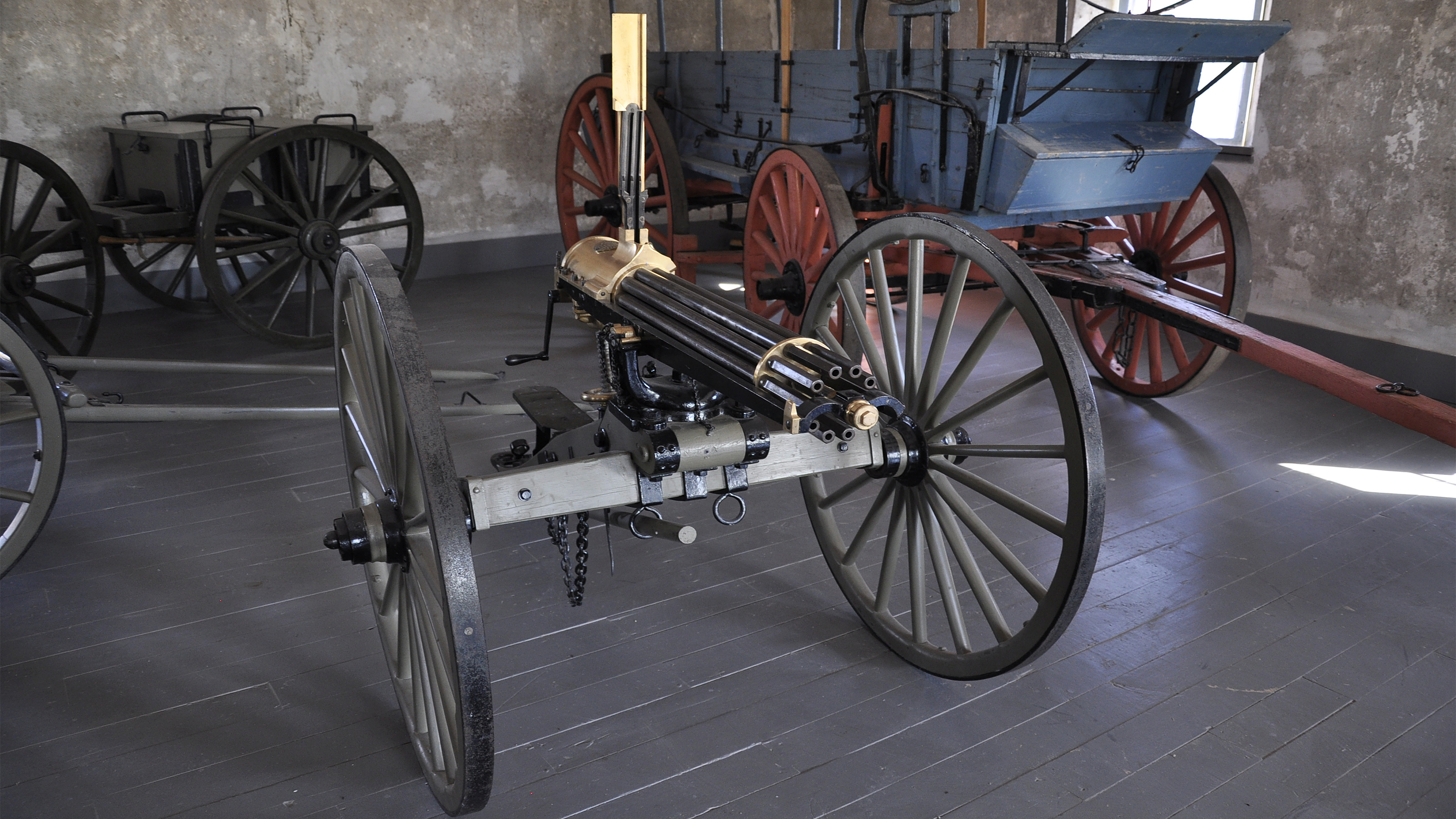
An 1876 Gatling gun kept at Fort Laramie National Historic Site

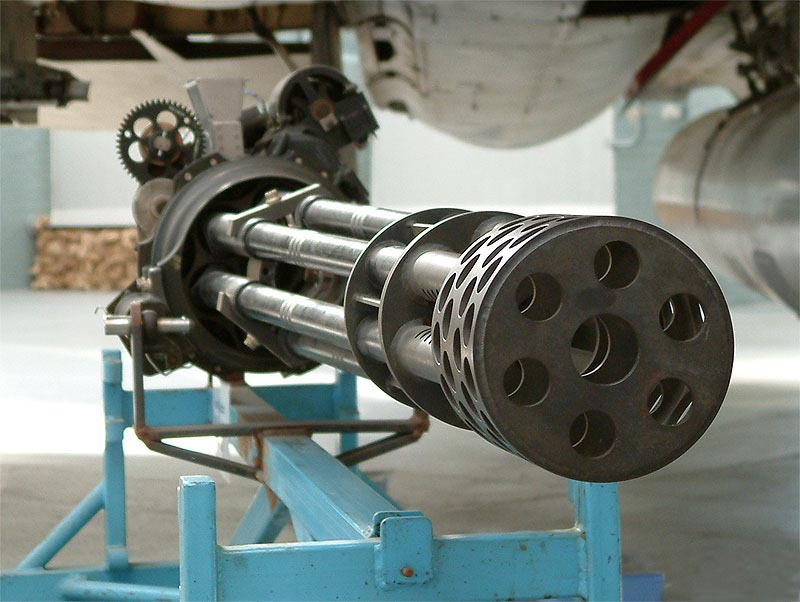
An unmounted M61A1 Vulcan with flash suppressor used in the SUU-16/A gun pod

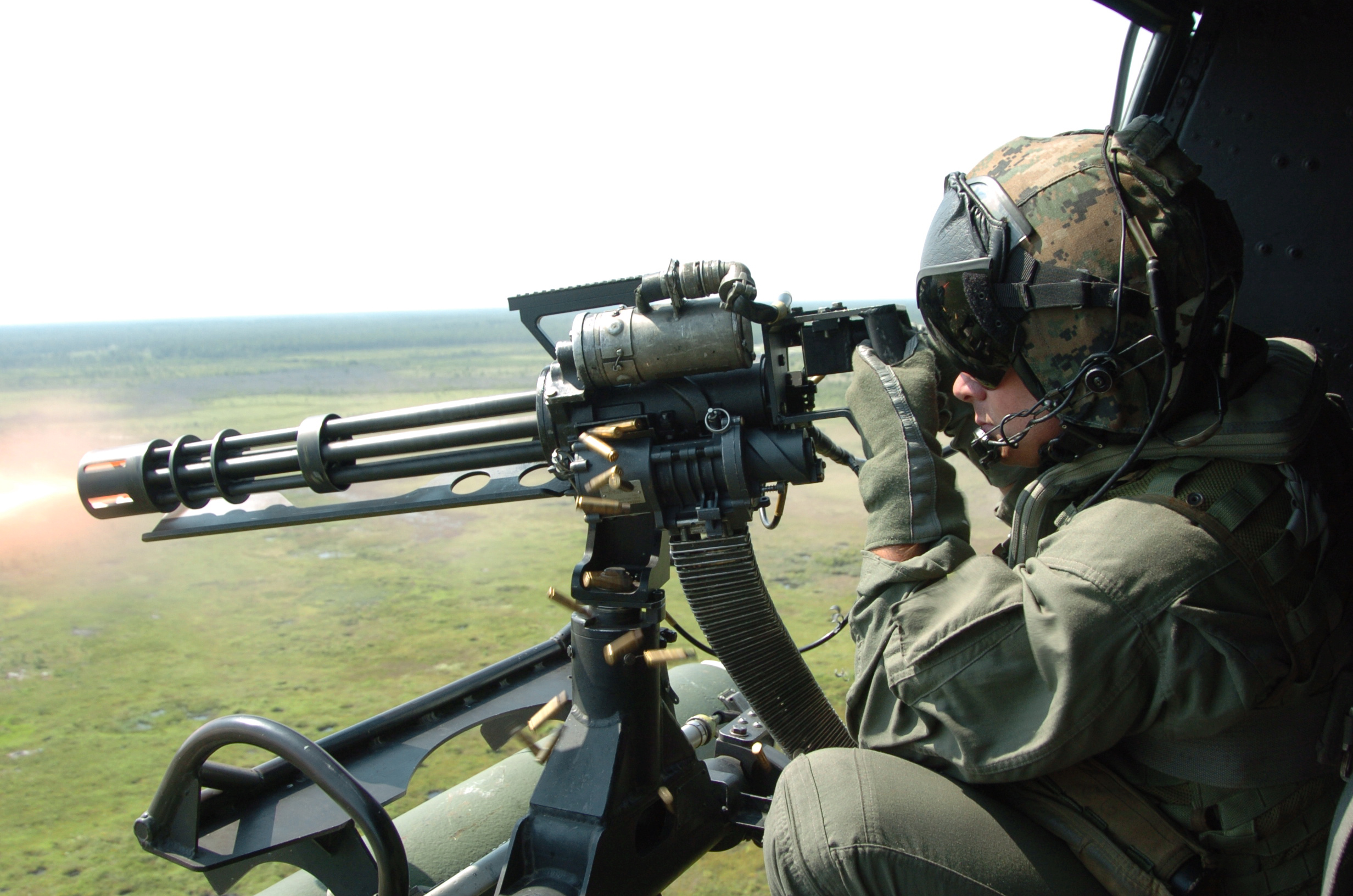
GAU-17/A fired from a UH-1N

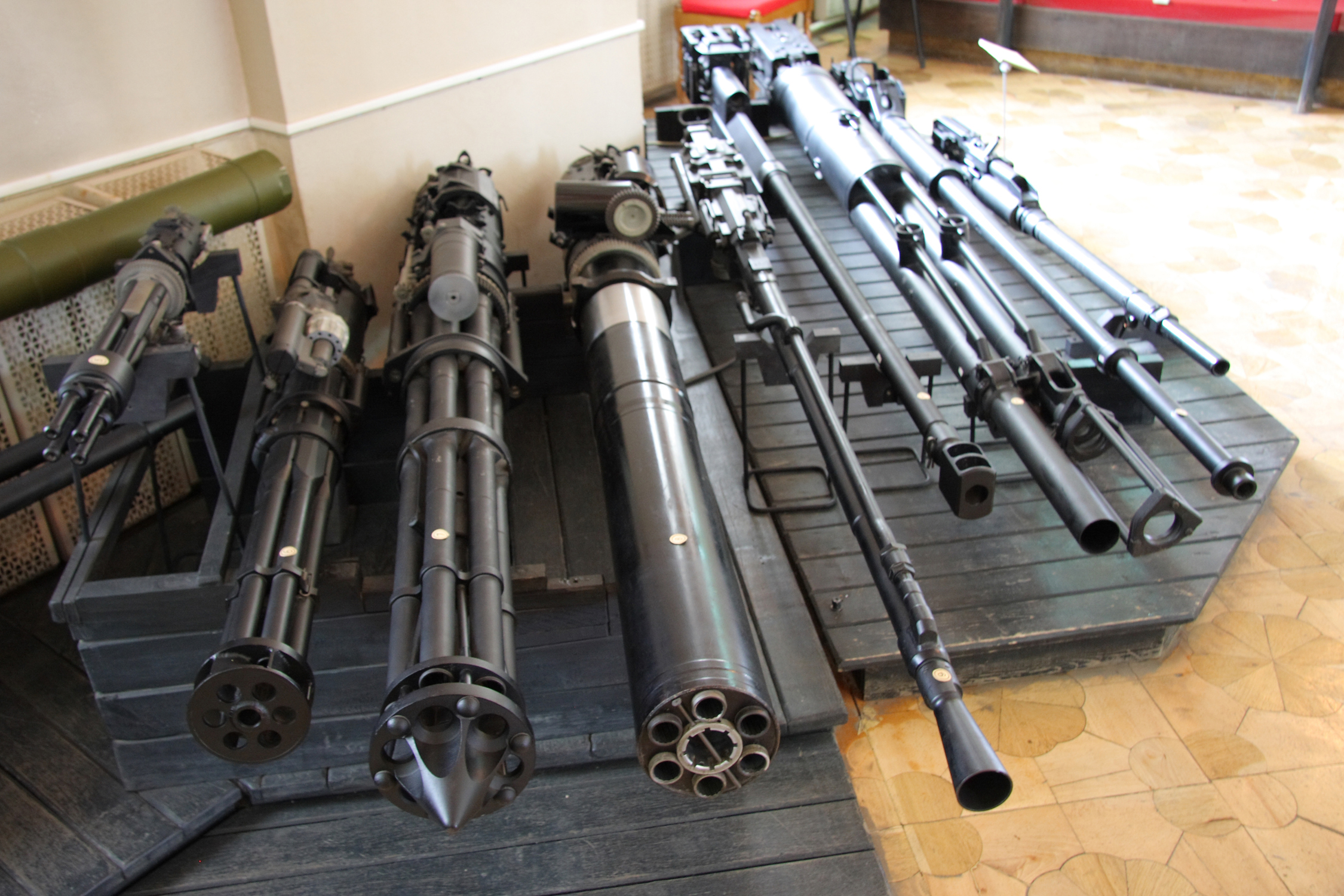
Four Soviet/Russian rotary cannons arranged in ascending caliber, from the left: GShG-7.62, GSh-6-23, GSh-6-30, AK-630

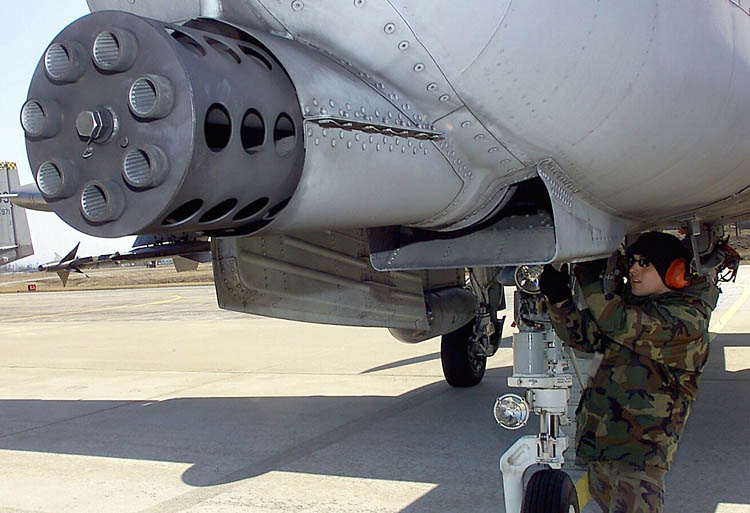
The seven-barrelled 30 mm GAU-8 Avenger rotary cannon of an A-10 Thunderbolt II

==== Manual ====
The earliest rotary-barrel firearm is the Gatling gun, invented by Richard Jordan Gatling in 1861, and patented on 4 November 1862. The Gatling gun operated by a hand-crank mechanism, with six barrels revolving around a central shaft (although some models had as many as ten). Each barrel fires once per revolution at about the same 4 o'clock position. The barrels, a carrier and a lock cylinder were separate and all mounted on a solid plate, mounted on an oblong fixed frame. Manually turning the crank rotated the shaft. The carrier was grooved and the lock cylinder was drilled with holes corresponding to the barrels. Cartridges, held in a hopper-like magazine on top, dropped individually into the grooves of the carrier. The lock was simultaneously forced by the cam to move forward and load the cartridge, and when the cam was at its highest point, the cocking ring freed the lock and fired the cartridge. After the cartridge was fired the continuing action of the cam drew back the lock bringing with it the spent casing which then dropped to the ground.

The Gatling gun was first used in combat during the American Civil War. Twelve of the guns were purchased personally by Union Army commanders and used in the trenches during the Siege of Petersburg (June 1864 – April 1865). Eight other Gatling guns were fitted on gunboats. The gun was not accepted by the Army until 1866, when a sales representative of the manufacturing company demonstrated it in combat. On 17 July 1863, Gatling guns were purportedly used to overawe New York anti-draft rioters. Post-Civil War, two Gatling guns were brought by a Pennsylvania National Guard unit from Philadelphia to use against strikers in the Pittsburgh Railway riots. During the American Indian Wars, Gatling guns saw frequent service, though famously not used at the Battle of the Little Bighorn when Gen. George Armstrong Custer chose not to bring any with his main force. In 1885, Lieutenant Arthur L. Howard of the Connecticut National Guard took a personally owned Gatling gun to Saskatchewan, Canada for use with the Canadian military against Métis rebels during Louis Riel's North-West Rebellion.

Gatling guns were used by the U.S. Army during both the Spanish–American War and the Philippine–American War. A four-gun battery of Colt-made Model 1895 ten-barrel Gatling guns in .30 Army was formed into a separate detachment led by Lt. John "Gatling Gun" Parker. The detachment proved very effective, supporting the advance of American forces at the Battle of San Juan Hill. Three of the Gatlings with swivel mountings were used with great success against the Spanish defenders. Despite this, the Gatling's weight and cumbersome artillery carriage hindered its ability to keep up with infantry forces over difficult ground, particularly in Cuba and the Philippines, where outside the major cities there were heavily foliaged forests and steep mountain paths, and the roads were often little more than jungle footpaths.

Elsewhere, a Gatling gun was purchased in April 1867 for the Argentine Army by minister Domingo F. Sarmiento under instructions from president Bartolomé Mitre. Captain Luis Germán Astete of the Peruvian Navy took dozens of Gatling guns with him in December 1879 from the United States for use during the Peru-Chile War of the Pacific, especially in the Battle of Tacna (May 1880) and the Battle of San Juan (January 1881). The Gatling gun was used most successfully to expand European colonial empires in Africa to defeat mounting massed attacks by indigenous warriors (e.g. the Zulu, Bedouin, and Mahdists). Imperial Russia purchased 400 Gatling guns against Turkmen cavalry and other nomads of Central Asia. The British Army first deployed the Gatling gun in 1873–74 during the Anglo-Ashanti wars, and extensively during the latter actions of the 1879 Anglo-Zulu war. The Royal Navy used Gatling guns during the 1882 Anglo-Egyptian War.

==== Automatic ====
After the original Gatling gun was replaced in service by newer recoil-/gas-operated machine guns, the approach of using multiple rotating barrels fell into disuse for many decades. However, some prototypes were developed during the interwar years, but rarely used. During World War I, Imperial Germany worked on the Fokker-Leimberger, an externally powered 12-barrel Gatling gun nicknamed "nutcracker", that could fire more than 7,200 rounds per minute, though many accused it of exaggeration. Failures during the war were attributed to the poor quality of German wartime ammunition, although the type of breech employed had ruptured-case problems in a British 1950s experimental weapon. Fokker continued to experiment with this type of breech after his post-war move to the United States. A different Fokker prototype in a US museum attests to the failure of this line of development.

After World War II, the U.S. Army Air Force determined that an improved automatic cannon with an extremely high rate of fire was required against fast-moving enemy jet aircraft. Using experience gained from the Luftwaffe MG 151 and MK 108 cannons, a larger-caliber cannon shell for the new gun was deemed desirable. In June 1946, the General Electric Company was awarded a U.S. military defense contract to develop a high-ROF aircraft gun, which GE termed "Project Vulcan". While researching prior work, ordnance engineers recalled the experimental electrically-driven Gatling weapons from the turn of the 20th century. In 1946, a Model 1903 Gatling gun borrowed from a museum was set up with an electric motor and test-fired, briefly managing a rate of 5,000 rounds per minute. In 1949, GE began testing the first model of its modified Gatling design, now called the Vulcan Gun. The first prototype was designated the T45 (Model A), firing .60 in (15 mm) ammunition at about 2,500 rounds per minute from six barrels, and in 1950 GE delivered ten initial Model A .60 cal. T45 guns for evaluation. Thirty-three model C T45 guns in three calibers (.60 cal., 20 mm and 27 mm) were delivered in 1952 for additional testing. After extensive testing, the T171 20mm gun was selected for further development, and was standardized by the U.S. Army and U.S. Air Force in 1956 as the M61 Vulcan gun.

== See also ==
- Repeating rifle
- Semi-automatic
