= Lewis Jennings =

Louis Jennings was an American gunsmith of 19th century who expanded upon the repeating rifle mechanism system of Walter Hunt, but did not get any prominence among the armed forces.
