= Half-cock =

Hammer position of a firearm

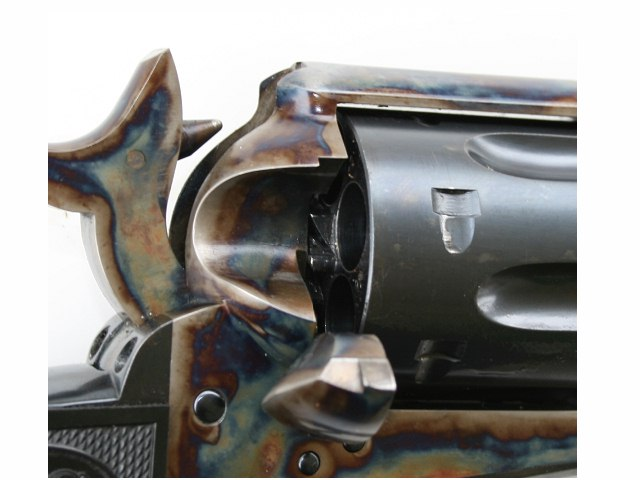
Colt Single Action Army hammer at half cock

Half-cock is when the position of the hammer of a firearm is partially—but not completely—cocked. Many firearms, particularly older firearms, had a notch cut into the hammer allowing half-cock, as this position would neither allow the gun to fire nor permit the hammer-mounted firing pin to rest on a live percussion cap or cartridge. The purpose of the half-cock position has variously been used either for loading a firearm, as a quasi-safety mechanism, or for both reasons. The still commonly used English expression of "going off half-cocked" derives from failing to complete the cocking action, leading to the weapon being unable to fire. This is often used to describe someone acting prematurely, as in the case of one preparing to shoot their weapon without having set the firearm into "full-cock" position.

== Early examples ==
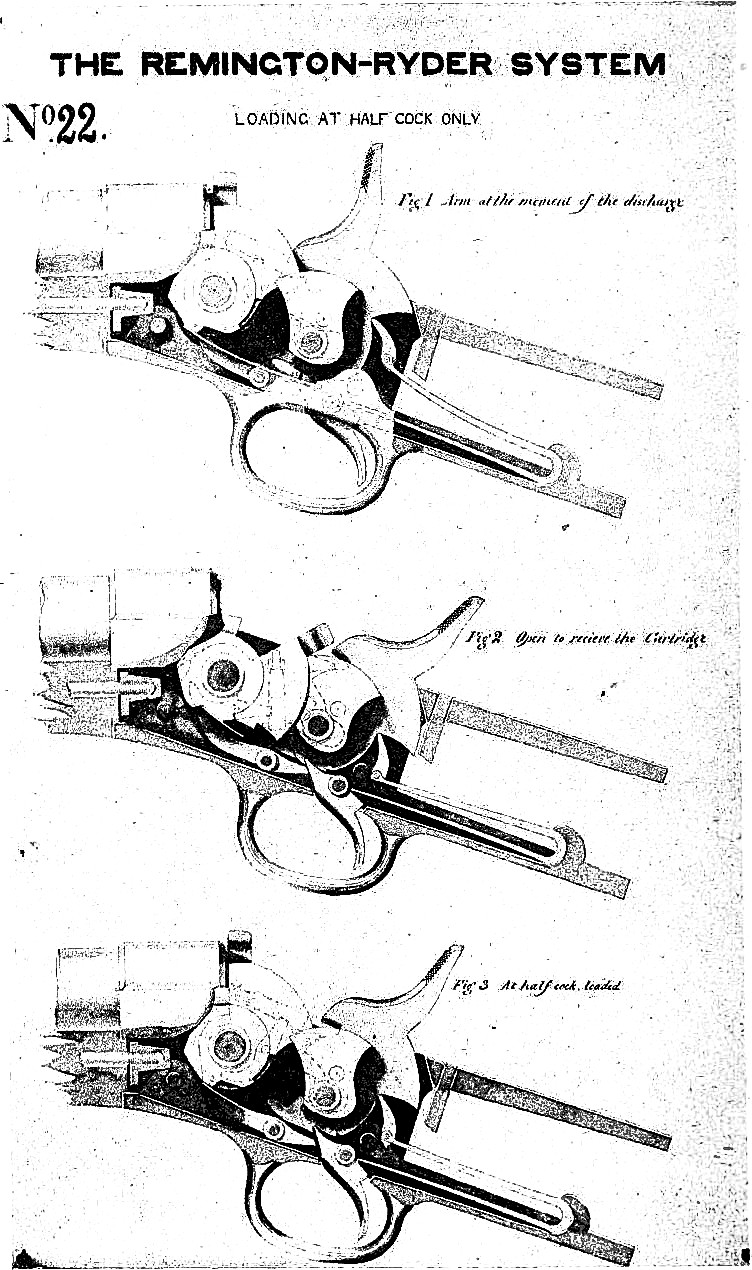
Cutaway view of the action of the Remington-Ryder No. 22 breech-loading rifle, which loads only with the hammer at half cock. Figure 1: Arm at the moment of discharge. Figure 2: Open to receive the cartridge. Figure 3: At half cock, loaded.

Early flintlocks had required a half-cock position to prime the pan, in preparation for firing the firearm, after loading the main chamber. Some other early types of revolvers, such as the Colt 1851 Navy Revolver, required the user to place the hammer at half-cock to permit rotation of the cylinder to load the firearm. On such firearms, the standard practice was not to load all 6 chambers and leave the hammer at half-cock, but, rather, to load only 5 of 6 chambers by standard safety practice, and stow the dropped hammer on an unloaded chamber. Nonetheless, some users did use the half-cock notch as a very early safety on such revolvers when all 6 chambers were loaded, often to a dangerous and unintended consequence.

Likewise, some early types of repeating lever action cartridge rifles—such as the Winchester Model 94 rifle—had a half-cock position that was intended to serve as a safety mechanism, to keep the hammer away from the firing pin while holding the rifle when a round was chambered, such as when in a blind awaiting game to appear. Although the practice is less common today, the half-cock notch position on such rifles was formerly used by many hunters as a safety when carrying the loaded rifle with a round chambered while hunting. The half-cock position of the hammer did not serve a purpose while loading such firearms.

== Common examples and breakage ==
The half-cock notch most commonly worked through insertion of a spring-loaded thin metal plate into a slot cut into the tumbler, the tumbler being variously either part of the hammer or mechanically attached to the pivot-point of the hammer, depending on the particular firearm under discussion. When the tumbler/hammer rotated quickly from full-cock, the spring-loaded metal plate could not engage into the slot cut into the tumbler, and the firearm could fire since the hammer would fully rotate. When the tumbler/hammer rotated slowly from full-cock, such as when engaging the half-cock notch, the metal plate would slide into the slot cut in the tumbler, thereby preventing the hammer/tumbler from rotating fully, hence preventing the hammer from falling and the gun from firing.

In practice, the half-cock notch was often prone to breakage when used as an early safety mechanism, whereby the tumbler would have part of the metal around the slot shear away, thereby removing the fragile safety mechanism, and permitting the hammer to fall and the firearm to fire. This could occur from accidentally dropping the loaded firearm onto its half-cocked hammer even once.

== See also ==
- Glossary of firearms terms
- Slide stop
