= Bolt (firearms) =

Mechanical part of a firearm

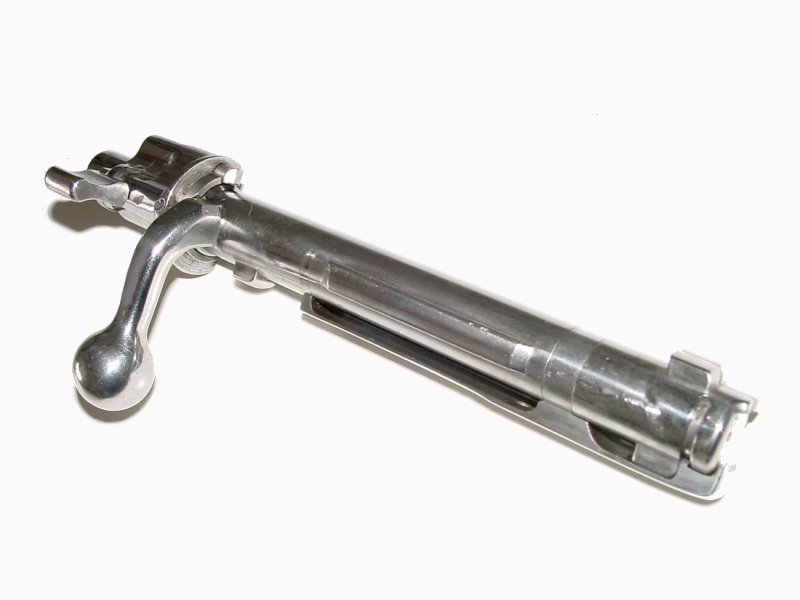
Bolt from a Karabiner 98k bolt-action rifle. Note the curved handle on the side for manual operation

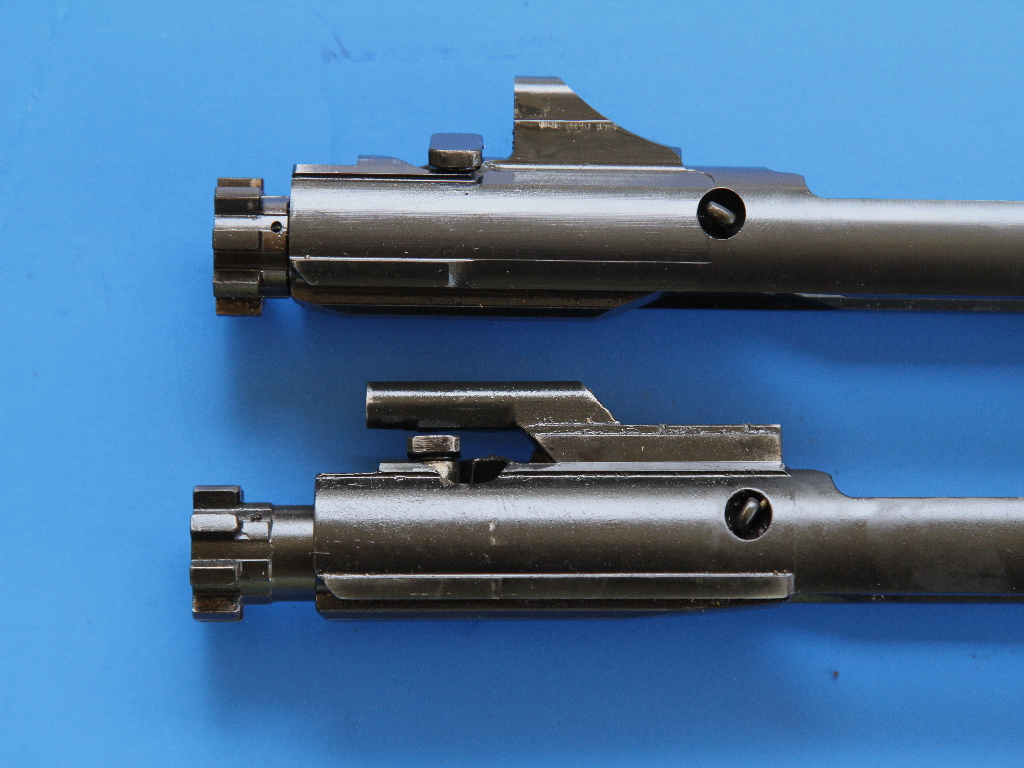
AR-15 bolt carriers: Upper example is for use with short-stroke gas piston, the lower example is for use with direct impingement

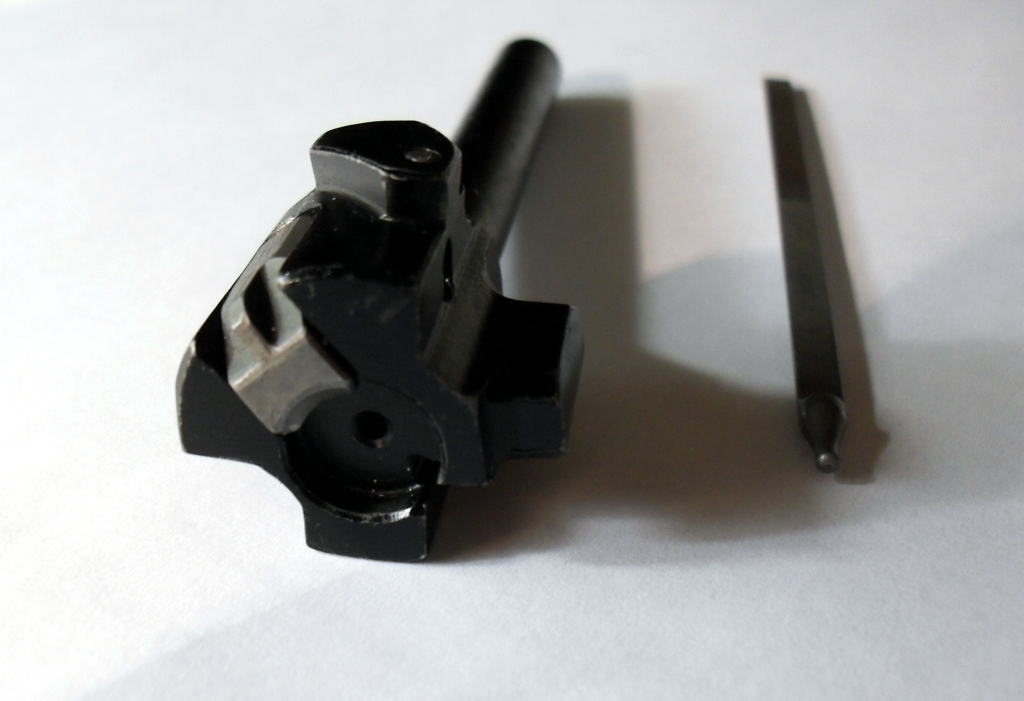
AK-74 bolt and firing pin

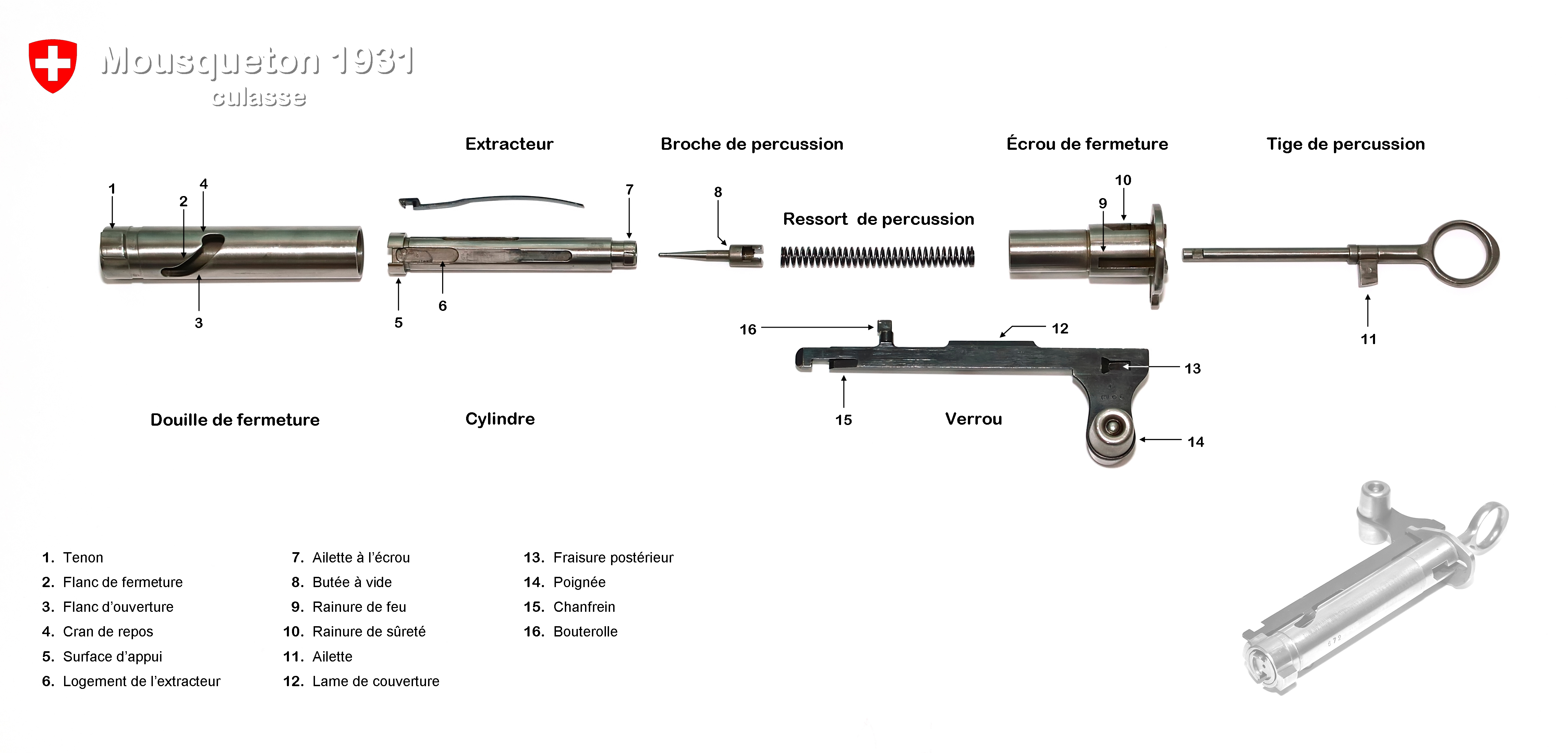
K31 bolt disassembled

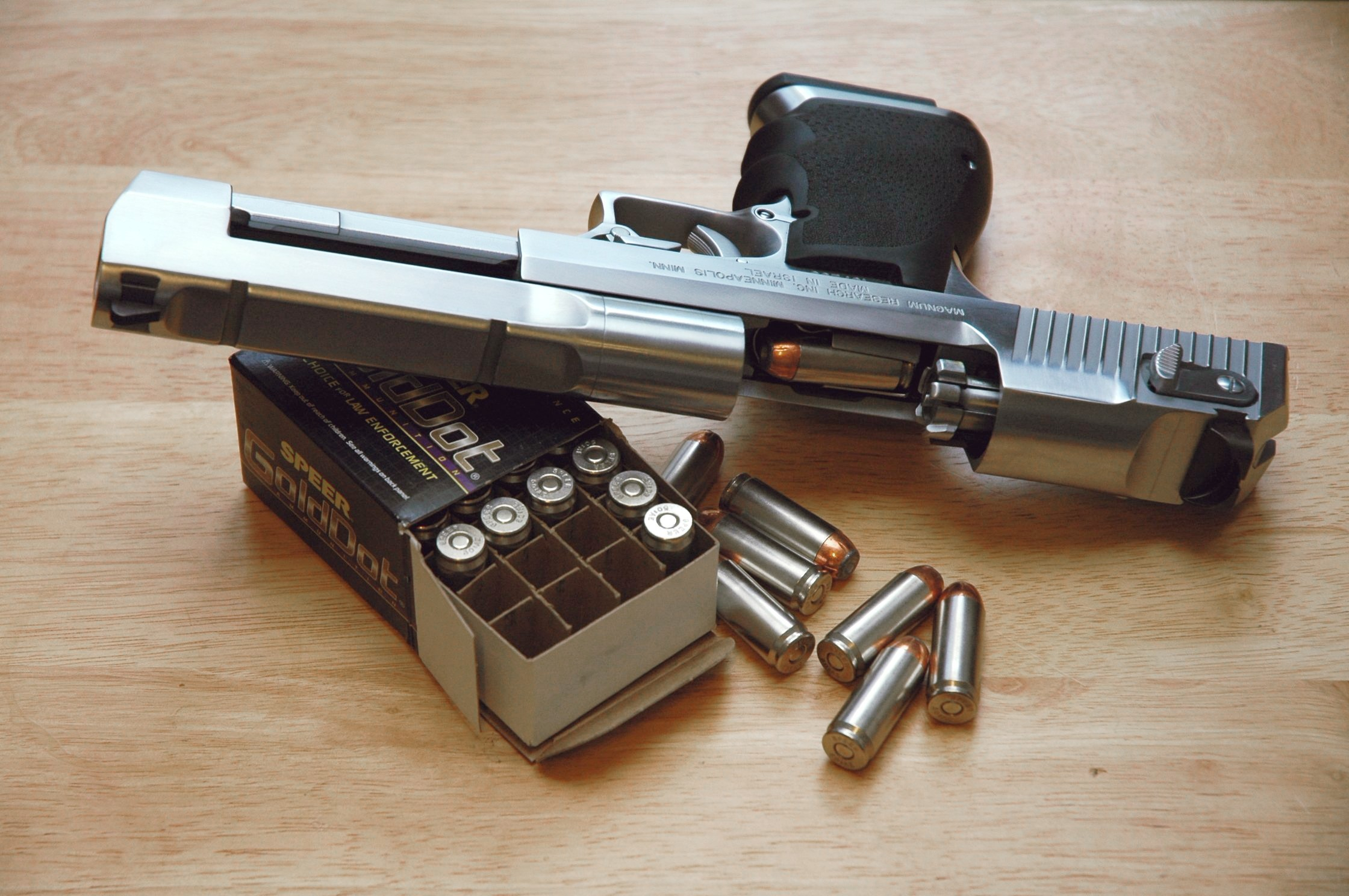
Slide locked back on a Desert Eagle pistol, showing the gas-operated rotating bolt mechanism

A bolt is the part of a repeating, breechloading firearm that blocks the rear opening (breech) of the barrel chamber while the propellant burns, and moves back and forward to facilitate loading/unloading of cartridges from the magazine. The firing pin and extractor are often integral parts of the bolt. The terms "breechblock" and "bolt" are often used interchangeably or without a clear distinction, though usually, a bolt is a type of breechblock that has a nominally circular cross-section.

In most automatic firearms that use delayed blowback, recoil, or gas operation, the bolt itself is housed within the larger bolt carrier group (BCG), which contains additional parts that receives rearward push from a gas tube (direct impingement) or a gas piston (short-stroke or long-stroke piston) system. The slide of a self-loading pistol contains the same components and serves similar functions.

== Operation ==
In manually operated firearms, such as bolt-action, lever-action, and pump-action rifles or shotguns, the bolt is held fixed by its locking lugs during firing, forcing all the expanding gas forward. It is manually unlocked and moved to extract the spent casing and chamber another round.

In a self-loading firearm (semi-automatic, burst fire, or fully automatic), the bolt cycles back and forward between each shot, propelled back by recoil (recoil operation) or the expanding gas (blowback and gas operation) and forward by a spring. When it moves back, the extractor pulls the spent casing of the previous shot from the chamber, and once the case is clear out of the chamber, the ejector kicks the case out of the firearm. When the bolt moves forward, it picks up a new cartridge from the magazine and pushes it into the chamber.

A telescoping bolt is a bolt that wraps around the breech end of the barrel. This bolt design is often used to reduce overall weapon length without sacrificing barrel length or bolt weight.

A turn bolt refers to a firearm component where the whole bolt without using a bolt carrier turns to lock and unlock. This is most commonly found in bolt-action firearms but is also found in some automatic firearms.

The most common locking mechanism on rifles is a rotating bolt, which can be classified as a rigid type of bolt lock. Semi-rigid bolt locks have their locking elements movably mounted on either the bolt, barrel or breech housing and using a bolt carrier. Examples of semi-rigid bolt locks are roller-locked bolts, or ball bearings as on Heym SR 30 or Anschütz 1827 Fortner (both straight-pull rifles).

== Closed bolt vs. open bolt ==
In a closed bolt firearm, the bolt is in its foremost position upon firing. This is opposed to an open bolt firearm where the bolt is held rearward, and pulling the trigger releases it to slam forward and fire the cartridge.

== Bolt hold-open ==
A device/method of holding the bolt open, usually for inspection/reloading/barrel cooling/safety purposes.

== See also ==
- Action (firearms)
- Locked breech
- Tilting bolt
