= Hammer (firearms) =

Part of a firearm

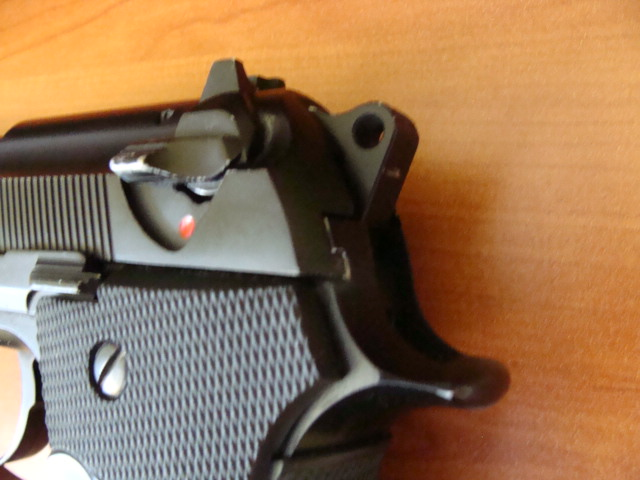
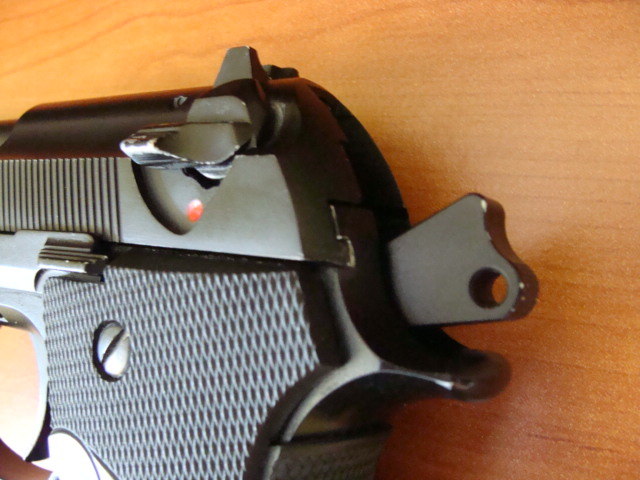
Hammer uncocked (top). Hammer cocked (bottom).

From the top: striker-fired, linear hammer with free-floating firing pin, hammer-fired with free-floating firing pin, and hammer-fired with integral firing pin

The hammer is a part of a firearm that is used to strike the percussion cap/primer, or a separate firing pin, to ignite the propellant and fire the projectile. It is so called because it resembles a hammer in both form and function. The hammer itself is a metal piece that forcefully rotates about a pivot point.

The term tumbler can refer to a part of the hammer or a part mechanically attached to the pivot-point of the hammer, depending on the particular firearm under discussion (see half-cock). According to one source the term tumbler is synonymous with hammer.

== Evolution ==
Flintlock firing

In the development of firearms, the flintlock used flint striking steel to produce sparks and initiate firing by igniting the gunpowder used as a propellant. The flint was fixed to a swinging arm called the cock. Prior to firing, the cock was held rearward under spring tension. Pulling the trigger allowed the cock to rotate forward at a speed sufficient to produce sparks when it struck the steel frizzen. This ignited a small priming charge in the external flash pan, which in turn ignited the propellent charge in the breech through a connecting vent hole. The identification of percussion sensitive fulminates provided an alternative to spark ignition of the propellant. The percussion lock (also caplock) was adapted from the flintlock firing mechanism, with the cock being modified to strike a small cup-like cap containing percussive material. The cap was placed over an external nipple, which acts as an anvil and conduit to ignite the main propellant charge within the breech. In this use, the cock has come to be termed a hammer.

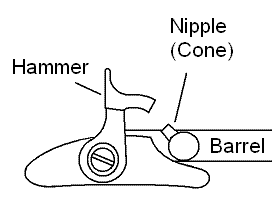
All caplock mechanisms rely upon a hammer impact.

Samuel Colt's Colt Paterson revolver of 1836 used percussion caps. The hammer and other components of the firing mechanism are mounted between the sides that form the frame. While not unique, percussion and flint-locks more typically use a side-lock firing mechanism, with the components mounted either side of the mounting plate.

The caplock was in wide use for almost five decades until the widespread introduction of the self-contained cartridge which contained the projectile, gunpowder, and percussion cap all in a single shell that could be easily loaded from the breech of a firearm. The introduction of such a technology led to the implementation of the firing pin and hammer system that is even now still used in certain designs. Whereas the percussion cap in the caplock mechanism was external, the percussion cap in a self-contained cartridge is inside the breech. It is therefore necessary to use a firing pin (a thin rod) to strike the primer through a small penetration in the breech and cause firing.

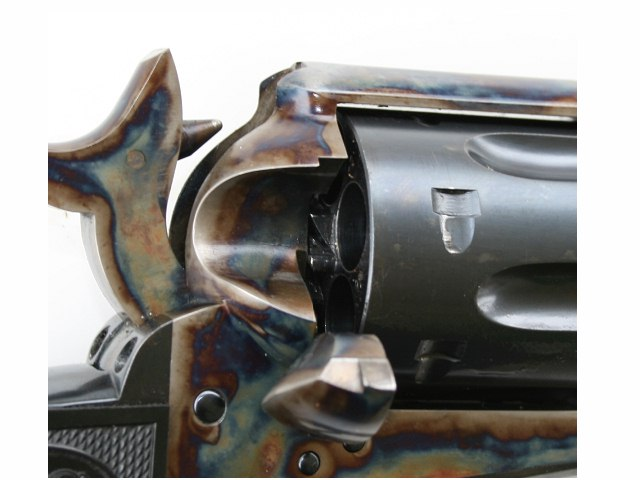
A Colt Single Action Army at half-cock, showing the external hammer and integral firing pin typical of many revolvers.

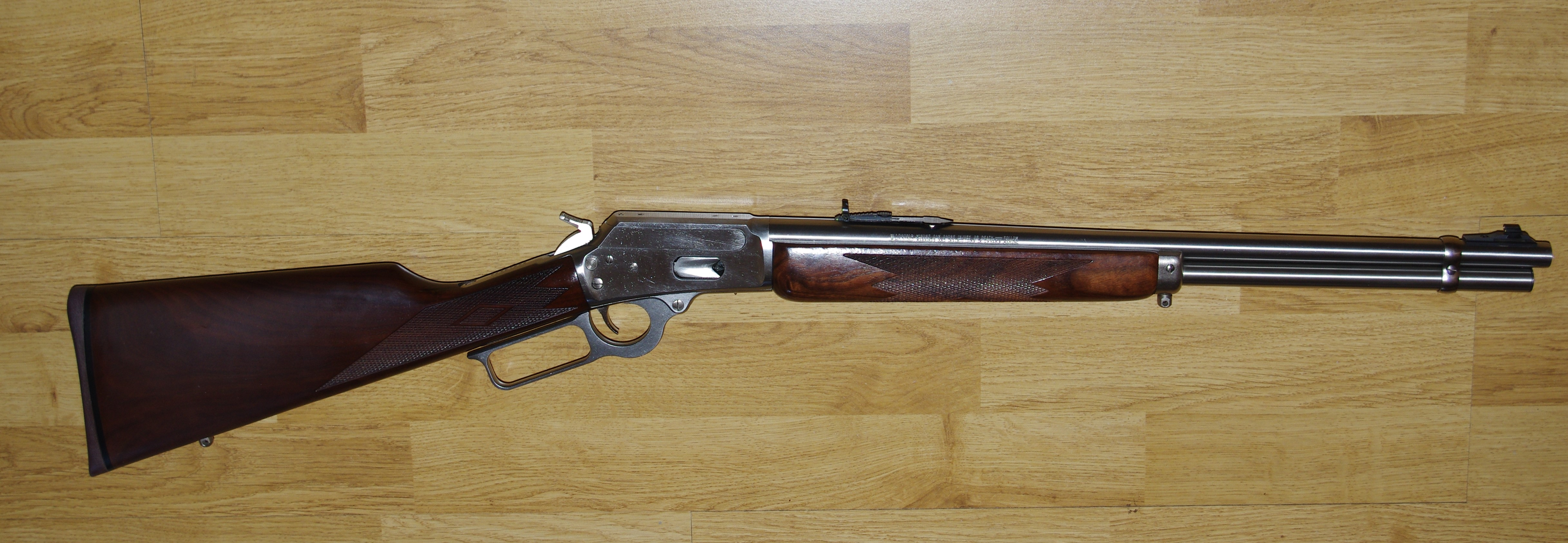
A Marlin Model 1894 rifle. The hammer and firing pin are separate components.

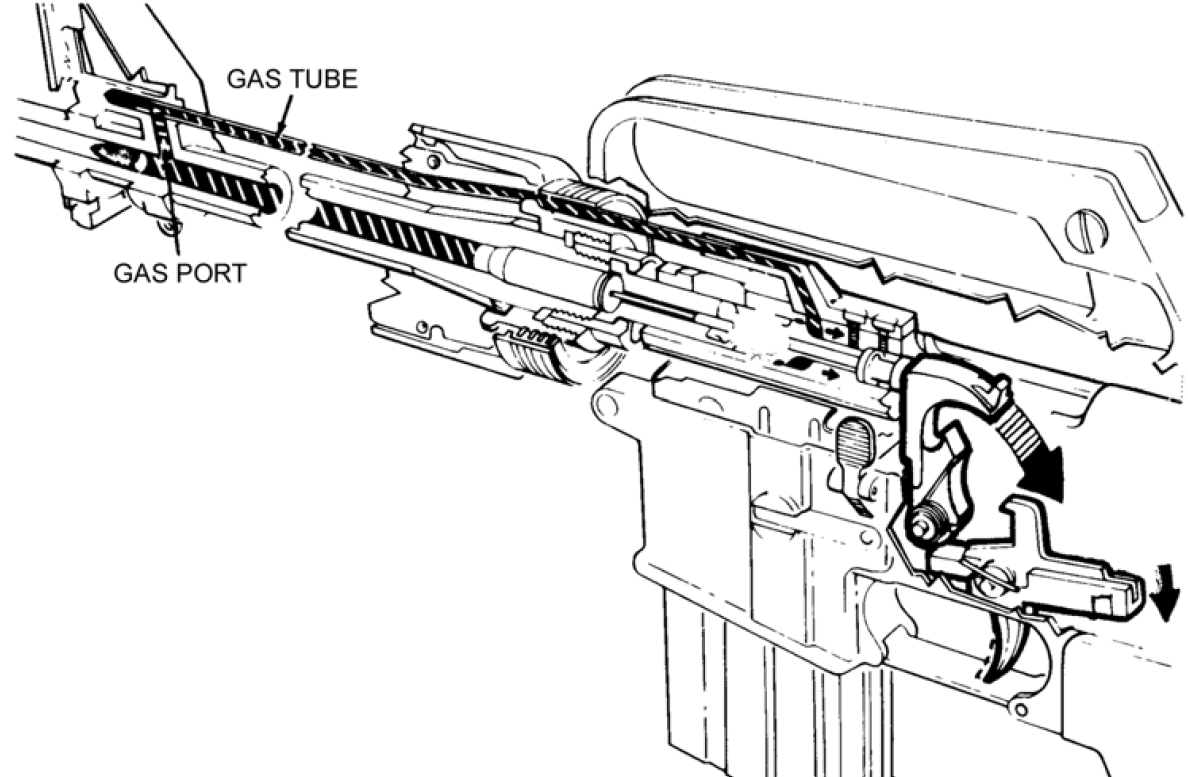
The M16 rifle uses an internal hammer.

An external hammer is one that can be accessed by the operator during use. This allows the hammer to be manually cocked or eased (uncocked) without firing. The hammer is designed with a spur (extension) to facilitate manual operation. An internal hammer cannot be accessed manually during operation. Pistols and shotguns in particular, which have an internal hammer may be referred to as being hammerless.

A striker is a type of firing pin operated by the direct action of a spring rather than by a hammer striking the firing pin. Striker-operated firearms lack a hammer.

== Drawbacks ==
There are some notable drawbacks to the external hammer system compared to other modern, internal designs. In single-action revolvers, specifically, there is an ever-present danger of accidentally discharging the weapon if the hammer is struck with a cartridge loaded in the chamber. There is nothing to prevent the hammer from contacting the firing pin and by default the cartridge, in some models, and so the gun will be discharged unintentionally.

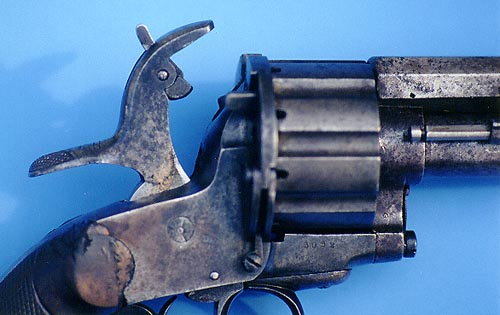
An external hammer that could easily catch on clothing

Other models do have an internal safety mechanism that prevents contact between the hammer and the firing pin unless the trigger is actually pulled. Even so, many single-action revolver owners choose to carry their revolver with the hammer resting on an empty chamber to minimize the risk of accidental discharge. Additionally, for those who carry their firearm as a personal defense weapon, there is the ever-present worry that an external hammer may catch on a loose article of clothing in an emergency situation, because the hammer protrudes at an angle from the rear of the weapon, and as the owner moves to quickly draw their weapon, the hammer may snag on clothing and cause the loss of seconds in a dangerous situation. Paul B. Weston, an authority on police weapons, called the external a "fish hook" that tended to snag clothing during a fast draw.

== Linear hammer ==
A linear hammer is similar to but differs from a striker in that the hammer is a separate component from the firing pin. When released, a linear hammer, under spring pressure, slides along the bore axis rather than pivoting around a pin placed perpendicular to the bore, as with the more common rotating hammer. The hammer then impacts the rear of the firing pin. Designs such as the Czech vz. 58 and the Chinese QBZ-95 utilize a linear hammer.

== See also ==
- Hammerless
