= 2015 Umpqua Community College shooting =

Mass shooting in Oregon, U.S.

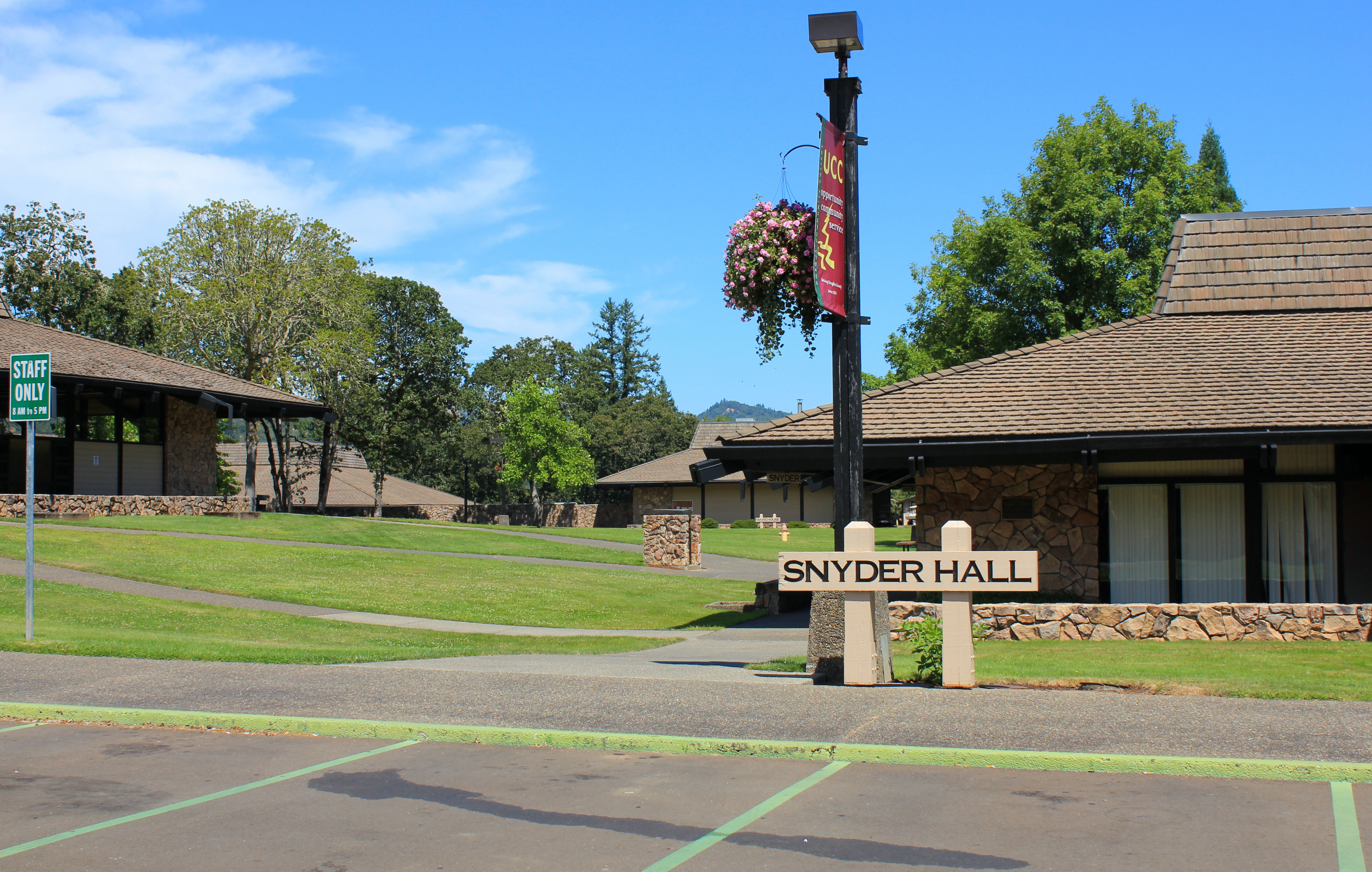
- Snyder Hall, the scene of the shooting
- Location: 43.2888°N 123.3320°W (Snyder Hall); Roseburg, Oregon, U.S.
- Date: October 1, 2015; 11 years ago 10:38 – 10:48 a.m. (PDT; UTC−07:00)
- Attack type: School shooting; mass shooting; mass murder; shootout; murder–suicide
- Weapons: 4 semi-automatic pistols: .40 S&W Smith & Wesson SW99; .40 S&W Taurus PT24/7; .380 ACP Hi-Point CF-380; 9mm Glock 19; .38 caliber S&W M642-2 revolver; 5.56 NATO Del-Ton DTI-15 semi-automatic rifle (unused)
- Deaths: 10 (including the perpetrator)
- Injuries: 8
- Perpetrator: Christopher Sean "Chris" Harper-Mercer
- Motive: Revenge for perceived sexual and social rejection; Notoriety

On October 1, 2015, a school shooting occurred at the Umpqua Community College campus near Roseburg, Oregon, United States. Christopher Sean Harper-Mercer, a 26-year-old who was enrolled at the school, fatally shot an assistant professor and eight students in a classroom and injured eight others. Roseburg police detectives responded to the incident and engaged Harper-Mercer in a brief shootout. After being wounded, he shot himself in the head. The school shooting is the deadliest in Oregon's history, surpassing the 1998 Thurston High School shooting.

== Shooting ==
At 10:38 a.m. PDT, the first 9-1-1 call was made from Snyder Hall on the school campus reporting gunfire. Students reported that the shooting began in Classroom 15, where English and writing classes are conducted.

Harper-Mercer, who was a student in the writing class, entered the hallway and fired a warning shot. Some witnesses said he then forced fellow students to the center of the classroom. Before he opened fire on the other students, he deliberately spared one student's life so that the student could deliver a package from him to the police. He forced this student to sit at the back of the classroom and watch as he continued shooting with two handguns (a 9mm Glock 19 and a .40 caliber Taurus PT24/7).

Harper-Mercer first shot the English professor at point-blank range. One student said that he asked two victims for their Christian belief, although their responses did not appear to determine who he shot. One victim was agnostic and another was pagan. Some students were shot multiple times; one woman was struck several times in the stomach while trying to close a classroom door. One witness said he made a woman beg for her life before shooting her, shot another woman when she tried to reason with him, and shot a third woman in the leg after she tried to defend herself with a desk. One victim, Sarena Dawn Moore, was killed while trying to climb back into a wheelchair on his orders. Harper Mercer told one victim, "I’m going to send you to God. You’re going to see God." before shooting them.

Roseburg Police Sergeant Joe Kaney and Detective Todd Spingath (who were in plainclothes at the time of the shooting) were the first to respond to the scene. They arrived at the hallway of Snyder Hall at 10:44, six minutes after the first 9-1-1 call was received. Two minutes later, Harper-Mercer reloaded his handguns and leaned out of the classroom, firing several shots at the officers. They fired three shots in return, hitting him once in the right side. After two more minutes of shooting at the officers, the wounded Harper-Mercer retreated into the classroom and killed himself with a single shot to his head. None of the officers were injured. Kaney is a U.S. Marine Corps veteran who had 23 years of experience on the Roseburg Police Department while Spingath is a U.S. Air Force veteran who had 16 years of experience on the Roseburg Police Department.

The package that Harper-Mercer had given to a student during the attack contained writing in which the shooter stated his motivations. Harper-Mercer complained that he had "no friends, no job, no girlfriend" and was a virgin. He critiqued other mass killers. Harper-Mercer used language associated with the incel subculture. He expressed admiration for Elliot Rodger, the misogynist mass killer responsible for the 2014 Isla Vista attacks.

According to the Anti-Defamation League, "The issue most often raised about the shootings is whether they constitute an anti-Christian or anti-religious hate crime." By some accounts, the shooter asked his victims about their religion before killing them, but others point out that his rage was not limited to religious matters and stressed his mental health history. The report that the shooter asked victims about their religion before killing them comes from a survivor, as well as family members of the victims.

== Aftermath ==
Following the shooting, Bureau of Alcohol, Tobacco, Firearms and Explosives (ATF) agents launched a campus-wide search for explosives. Six firearms were recovered from the crime scene: five handguns and one long gun. None were owned by his mother. The long gun, a 5.56 x45 mm Del-Ton DTI-15 semi-automatic rifle, was not used during the incident. Harper-Mercer also had a flak jacket and "enough ammunition for a prolonged gunfight". Police said they found eight other firearms at his apartment, and that all of the weapons were purchased legally by him or members of his family. Almost four hours after the shooting, Laurel Harper was interviewed by Oregon State Police detectives, but the content was not released until September 13, 2017. She said her son had been prescribed medication, but it did not seem to help, and that he had been "born angry." She told police that he enjoyed watching videos of killings on the Internet. Their home was so disordered that, after the murders, she could not tell what guns were missing.

== Victims ==
=== Fatalities ===
The attacker killed a total of nine people: eight died at the scene while the ninth died at Mercy Medical Center. The deceased were:

- Lucero Alcaraz, age 19
- Treven Taylor Anspach, 20
- Rebecka Ann Carnes, 18
- Quinn Glen Cooper, 18
- Kim Saltmarsh Dietz, 59
- Lucas Eibel, 18
- Jason Dale Johnson, 33
- Lawrence Levine, 67
- Sarena Dawn Moore, 43

=== Injured ===
Eight other students were injured, some with multiple gunshot wounds.

Among the wounded was Chris Mintz, a U.S. Army veteran who was studying fitness training at the college, who responded when he heard screams coming from an adjacent classroom. He blocked the connected door with his body to allow his class to escape. He next left the building to alert students in the library to evacuate. Returning to the shooting scene, he advised a wounded student to stay down and be quiet. At that point, Harper-Mercer leaned out from the classroom into the hallway and shot Mintz five or seven times as he was first standing, then falling to the floor, because he said Mintz had called police. Mintz pleaded that he not be killed on his son's birthday and said an apparently emotionless Harper-Mercer withdrew back into the classroom.

At a press conference held on October 3, Douglas County Sheriff John Hanlin thanked Mintz for his actions. To help pay for his medical bills, Mintz's family set up a GoFundMe account. By the end of that day, it had already received more than US$650,000 in donations. Mintz was released from a hospital on October 7. On October 13, a 16-year-old girl who was critically wounded in the shooting was released from a hospital.

== Perpetrator ==
Christopher Sean "Chris" Harper-Mercer (July 26, 1989 – October 1, 2015) was enrolled in the introductory composition class where he shot his victims. He was born in Torrance, California to Ian Mercer, an Englishman, and Laurel Harper, a Black American woman. His parents separated before he was born, and agreed to share legal custody in their divorce. This never went through however, as Harper-Mercer spent his entire life living with his mother, and hadn't seen his father since they had moved to Oregon two years before the shooting.

Harper-Mercer joined the U.S. Army in 2008, but was discharged after five weeks for his failure to meet the "minimum administrative standards" of basic training at Fort Jackson, South Carolina. Officials linked to the investigation said that he was discharged as the result of a suicide attempt, but Army officials did not comment on this. In 2009, he graduated from Switzer Learning Center, a school for teenagers with learning disabilities or emotional issues. Laurel Harper was reportedly protective of him and tried to shield him from various perceived annoyances, some of them minor, in their neighborhood in Torrance. From early 2010 to early 2012, Harper-Mercer attended El Camino College in Torrance.

Harper-Mercer maintained several Internet accounts, including one in which he described himself as mixed race. Media reports said he had an e-mail address linked to an account on a BitTorrent website. The last upload on the account, three days before the Umpqua shooting, was a documentary on the Sandy Hook Elementary School shooting. According to the Los Angeles Times, unnamed law enforcement sources described him as a "hate-filled" man with antireligious and white supremacist leanings, and with long-term mental-health issues. His mother, Laurel Harper, had previously written anonymously in an online forum that both she and her son had Asperger syndrome.

He and his mother moved to Winchester, Oregon in 2013 after she got a job there. His mother said he was initially excited to be able, unlike in California, to open carry. There were 14 legally purchased weapons kept in the apartment, and Harper-Mercer's mother wrote online that she always kept full magazines in Glock pistols and an AR-15 rifle inside. The two often spent time together at shooting ranges, but Harper-Mercer was otherwise extremely isolated.

Harper-Mercer had been placed on scholastic probation at Umpqua Community College for falling below a C average. According to his community college transcript, Harper-Mercer earned a 1.75 GPA during his time at UCC, and a letter dated September 1 warned him that he could be suspended if he did not raise his grades. A UCC tuition bill due on October 6 noted that Harper-Mercer owed $2,021.

On the day of the shooting, Harper-Mercer gave a survivor numerous writings showing he had studied mass killings, including the 2014 killing spree at Isla Vista, California. These expressed his sexual frustration as a virgin, animosity toward Black men, and a lack of fulfillment in his isolated life. In them, he said "Other people think I'm crazy, but I'm not. I'm the sane one," and that he would be "welcomed in Hell and embraced by the devil." He also reportedly admired the perpetrator of the WDBJ shooting for the fame received, and wrote that: "A man who was known by no one, is now known by everyone. His face splashed across every screen, his name across the lips of every person on the planet, all in the course of one day."

== Reactions ==
Video of President Obama delivering a statement on the shooting (12:44) (Note: See: "Statement by the President on the Shootings at Umpqua Community College, Roseburg, Oregon". White House Office of the Press Secretary. October 1, 2015.)

Oregon Governor Kate Brown said she was heartbroken by the events and that she would immediately travel to Roseburg. The American Association of Community Colleges and the Association of Community College Trustees issued a joint statement, calling the shooting a tragedy and expressing their commitment to on-campus safety.

Sheriff John Hanlin of Douglas County said he would not "name the shooter ... I will not give him credit for this horrific act of cowardice. Media will get the name confirmed in time ... but you will never hear us use it." (Note: The practice of withholding a perpetrator's name is controversial. The Associated Press cited a recent study suggesting that copycat crimes were more likely to happen within an average of 13 days following significant press coverage of a mass shooting, while noting that criminologists and ethicists say withholding names could make it more difficult to track patterns of behavior and prevent future acts of violence.)

U.S. President Barack Obama said that "thoughts and prayers [do] not capture the heartache and grief and anger that we should feel, and it does nothing to prevent this carnage from being inflicted some place else in America next week or a couple months from now." He ordered the U.S. flag to be flown at half staff in memory of the victims the day after the shootings. On October 5, the White House announced that Obama would continue to take more executive action on the subject of gun control. Obama was met at Roseburg Regional Airport by around 200 protesters rallying behind a security fence, some with holstered weapons, who also showed support for Sheriff Hanlin, who had been highly visible during press conferences about the shooting. After the Sandy Hook Elementary School shooting, Hanlin had sent a letter to Vice President Joe Biden saying he would not enforce any new gun legislation he deemed to be unconstitutional.

Although Harper-Mercer had substantial mental illness, he had never been involuntarily committed (which under federal and state law prohibits a person from purchasing a gun). Harper-Mercer was therefore able to pass a background check and bought a .380 semi-automatic handgun. An Oregon law passed in 2017, which went into effect in 2018, allows law enforcement or family members to file a petition in state court for an "extreme risk protection order"; such an order, if granted, temporarily blocks an individual from purchasing or possessing deadly weapons if the individual is determined to present an "imminent threat to themselves or others." Had the law been in effect earlier, it is possible that Harper-Mercer could have been prevented from purchasing his weapon.

A memorial for the victims of the shooting was unveiled in December 2016.

== See also ==
- 2014 Isla Vista killings
- Murders of Alison Parker and Adam Ward
- Anti-Christian sentiment
- List of homicides in Oregon
- Gun violence in the United States
- Gun law in the United States
- Gun politics in the United States
- Incel-related violence
- List of school shootings in the United States by death toll
- List of school shootings in the United States (2000–present)
- List of rampage killers (school massacres)
- Mass shootings in the United States
