= Firearm maintenance =

Routine procedures for ensuring the proper functioning of a firearm

2026}}

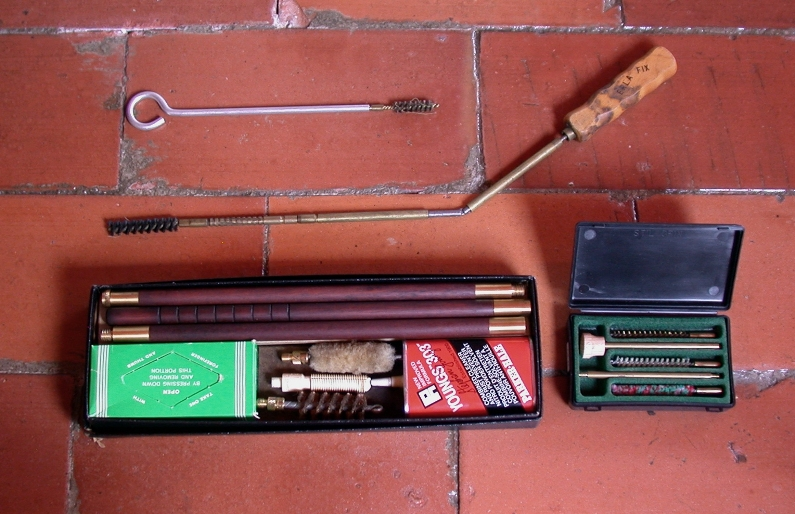
An assortment of cleaning rods used for firearm maintenance: A short cleaning rod with a brass brush attached, a foldable cleaning rod with a nylon brush attached, a cleaning kit for a shotgun (note the thicker rod), and some different brushes.

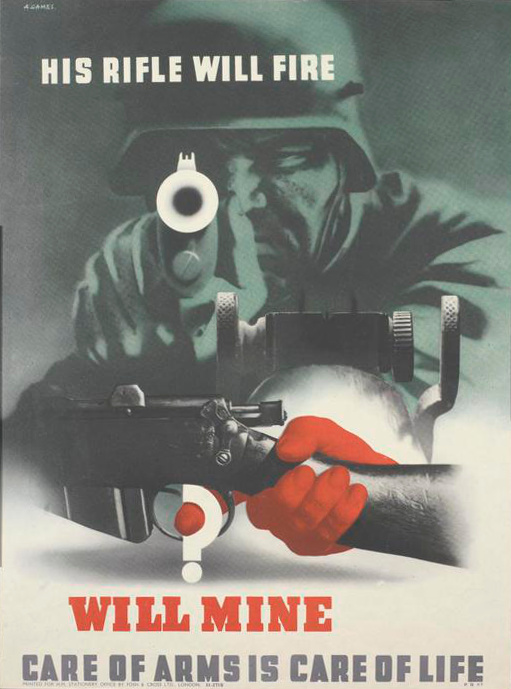
WWII-era British propaganda poster, encouraging soldiers to properly maintain their firearms

Firearm maintenance (or gun care for short) is a series of routine preventive maintenance procedures aiming to ensure the proper function of a firearm, often with the use of a variety of specialized tools and chemical solutions. Typically such maintenance is performed by the firearm owner using either simple methods such as cleaning the firearm with oil or other cleaning solutions or more sophisticated practices such as lubricating moving parts with oil/grease and recoating exposed surfaces with protective finishes such as varnishing or bluing.

When a firearm is presented with physical damage related to the ordinary use of the firearm, or when a firearm malfunctions in a life-threatening manner, a professional gunsmith should perform advanced maintenance to determine if the firearm is repairable and or safe to shoot anymore.

== Necessity ==
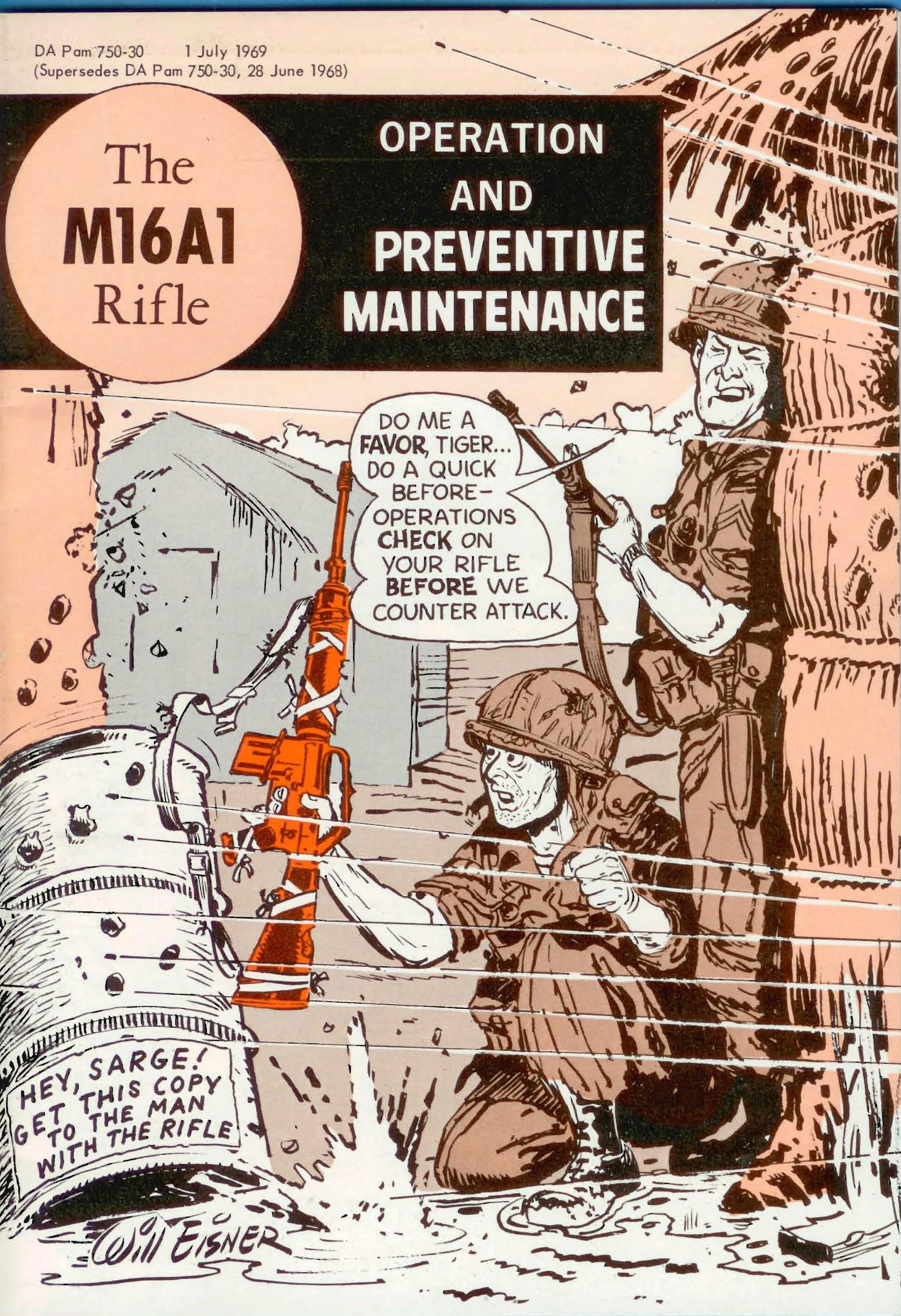
Front cover – The M16A1 Rifle – Operation and Preventive Maintenance by Will Eisner, issued to American soldiers in the Vietnam War.

An inadequately maintained firearm will often accumulate excessive fouling and dirt within the barrel and receiver, which not only can clog up the rifling and decrease the firearm's accuracy and precision, but can also interfere with the proper operation of the action and lead to potentially dangerous malfunctions. Furthermore, some of the fouling and dirts are either corrosive themselves, or capable of making the firearm vulnerable to rusting and wear, and thus can lead to irreversible damages to the firearm over time.

The consequences of neglecting proper maintenance can be serious. For instance, during the Vietnam War, the newly issued M16A1 assault rifle was distributed to US troops with marketing literature from Colt Firearms claiming that the weapon was self-cleaning, which implied to many to mean that it did not have to be routinely maintained. However, this misapprehension compounded the rifle's design flaws and made the weapon notorious for repeated failures in combat, which led to needless casualties among US forces. Once the problem was acknowledged by the US military, the weapon was not only subject to upgrades, but US troops were also trained in proper maintenance of the weapon and supplied with cleaning kits and an illustrated booklet on the subject by Will Eisner. With these measures, the reliability of the M-16 improved considerably.

== Cleaning ==
During routine firing, fine particles of propellant residue, metallic fragments—predominantly lead and copper abraded from the projectile as it traverses the rifling—and other contaminants are deposited on the internal surfaces of a firearm. Accumulation of this fouling can provoke malfunctions and, in rare cases of extreme buildup, elevate barrel pressure beyond safe limits, potentially causing the weapon to rupture in a catastrophic failure upon discharge.

Firearms that lack a spring-buffered firing-pin system have frequently been documented as requiring particularly diligent maintenance of the bolt assembly, because hazardous malfunctions such as slamfire may otherwise occur. Slamfire is a malfunction in which a weapon that is normally a semi-automatic may temporarily and involuntarily behave as a fully automatic firearm, firing successive rounds without further trigger engagement until the magazine is empty or a jam interrupts the cycle.

Every major firearms manufacturer supplies detailed instructions for the correct disassembly, cleaning, and reassembly of its products. These instructions are ordinarily packaged with the firearm at the time of sale and may be obtained directly from the manufacturer if they are missing.

A wide variety of commercial weapon- and firearm-cleaning kits is available, furnishing the tools and materials necessary to clean a firearm safely and effectively. Consistent use of such kits helps ensure proper lubrication and prolongs the service life of the firearm by reducing the likelihood of mechanical failure.

However, pre-made cleaning kits often do not contain everything a specialty gun owner may want or need. This is why many gun owners build their own custom cleaning kits which include extra materials or specialized parts to best keep their weapon in proper order.

== Lubrication ==
Firearms produce massive momentary forces upon firing a bullet. A typical 9mm projectile produces a maximum of 34,084 psi (2,350.0 bar) of pressure in the instant of firing. The amount of pressure a firearm may endure for the first few milliseconds after the cartridge fires can be over 2,300 times more than the normal atmospheric pressure. Therefore, it is important for the safety of the shooter, and the longevity of a firearm that it is properly lubricated as per the manufacturer's specifications.

When in an extreme and life-threatening situation such as preparing for combat, the manufacturer's recommended lubricants may not be available to soldiers, or others who may enter these scenarios. If there is time to perform firearm maintenance before a life-threatening emergency (such as daily cleaning of a rifle in a combat zone) it may become necessary to use other sources of lubrication, as a firearm will function better with some lubricant than it will with none. One United States Marine Corps sergeant recounts that synthetic motor oil performed better than standard military issued lubricant in extreme conditions. However it is advisable to immediately return to the standard recommendation of the firearm manufacturer when conditions allow.

Not all firearm maintenance products serve the same purpose. Some oils are formulated specifically for lubrication, whereas others are designed for cleaning. In high-load applications, grease may be employed when conventional oils are insufficient.

== Safety ==
It is critically important that a firearm is free of ammunition before beginning maintenance. The National Rifle Association of America teaches gun owners that "before cleaning your gun, make absolutely sure that it is unloaded. The gun's action should be open during the cleaning process. Also, be sure that no ammunition is present in the cleaning area". When reassembling a firearm after it has been cleaned, it is very important to know how to put the weapon back together properly. Failure to reassemble your firearm properly could lead to malfunction when firing and could lead to injury.

== See also ==
- Gunsmith
- Cleaning rod
- Handloading
