= Smith & Wesson Model 640 =

Revolver

S&W 640
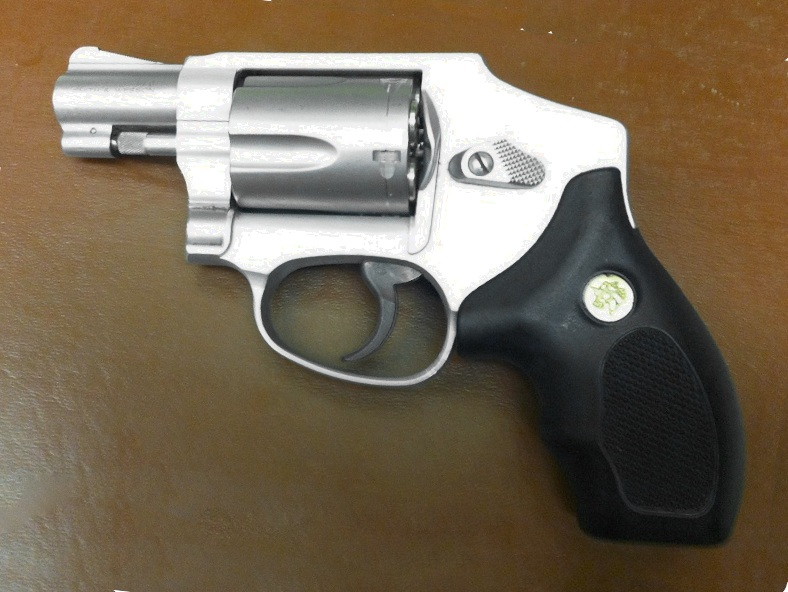
- Type: Service Revolver
- Place of origin: United States

Service history
- In service: 1989–present

Production history
- Manufacturer: Smith & Wesson
- Unit cost: $729.00

Specifications
- Mass: 22.58 oz.; 15.8 oz for alloy version
- Length: 6.56"
- Barrel length: 2.125"
- Caliber: .357 Magnum.38 Special.38 Special +P
- Action: DAO
- Effective firing range: 22.86 meters
- Maximum firing range: 45.72 meters
- Feed system: 5-round cylinder
- Sights: Fixed

The Smith & Wesson Model 640 revolver is a 5-shot snubnosed revolver that is chambered in either .38 Special or .357 Magnum caliber introduced in 1989.

== History ==
The first model was chambered in .38 Special and fitted with a standard barrel of 1-7/8 inch length.

The second model had a slightly heavier and longer barrel of 2-1/8 inch length.

A 3" barreled version was offered until 1993, when it was dropped from production.

In 1995 the model 642 was introduced which was made in aluminium and designated "airweight".

In 1996, S&W began chambering the 640 in .357 Magnum.

Because of the power of the .357 magnum cartridge, the frame is strengthened just in front of the cylinder release on those models.

== Design ==
The gun was constructed entirely of stainless steel.

Like other "J-frame" Smith & Wesson revolvers, it has a swing-out cylinder, but this model features a concealed hammer, and is part of the Centennial line.

== Variants ==
=== Model 940 ===
- Produced from 1993 to 1996
- Similar in appearance to 640, but chambered in 9mm Luger

=== Model 340 ===
- Scandium framed
- Introduced in 2001
- Weighed 10.9 ounces
- Chambered in 357 Magnum

== Users ==
- United States
  - New York City Police Department
    - Carried by officer Walter Weaver during the September 11, 2001 attacks
      - Currently displayed in the NRA National Firearms Museum in Fairfax, Virginia
