= Smith & Wesson Model 340PD =

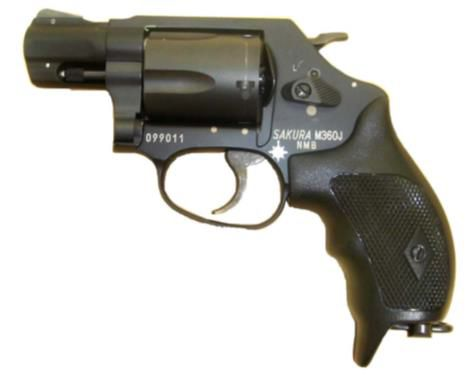
- Japanese SAKURA model with a hammer
- Type: Personal protection Revolver
- Place of origin: United States

Service history
- In service: 2000s–present

Production history
- Designer: Smith & Wesson
- Manufacturer: Smith & Wesson
- Unit cost: $1,149.00

Specifications
- Mass: 11.4 oz (323.2 g) (340PD); 13.3 oz (377 g) (M&P340)
- Length: 6.31" (16.0 cm)
- Barrel length: 1.875" (4.7 cm)
- Caliber: .357 Magnum.38 Special
- Action: DAO
- Feed system: 5-round cylinder
- Sights: Low-profile channel and fixed front blade

The Smith & Wesson 340PD is an ultra-light J-frame five shot snubnosed revolver chambered for .357 Magnum.

== Design ==
It has a frame constructed of scandium enhanced aluminum alloy, a titanium alloy cylinder, and a corrosion resistant steel barrel liner. Unloaded it weighs only 12 ounces (340 g) and when loaded remains under 1 pound (0.45 kg).

With no external hammer it operates double action only.

=== Limitations ===
There is a prohibition against using ammunition with bullet weight less than 120 grains (7.8 g) due to the risk of frame erosion from powder that is still burning after too rapid exit of the light projectile.

Another warning in the owners manual is recoil may pull the cases of unfired rounds in the cylinder rearward with enough force to unseat the bullets, causing the cylinder to jam.

It has also been said that accuracy is compromised in these types of ultra-light revolvers since the barrel is a steel sleeve liner rather than a single solid piece of steel.

== Variants ==
=== M&P340 ===
A variant of the Model 340 is the M&P340, part of Smith & Wesson's M&P line of handguns.

It features a PVD coating and stainless steel cylinder. It has XS Sights® 24/7 Tritium Night sights and weighs 13.3 ounces (377.8 g). It is available with or without an internal lock.
