= Smith & Wesson Centennial =

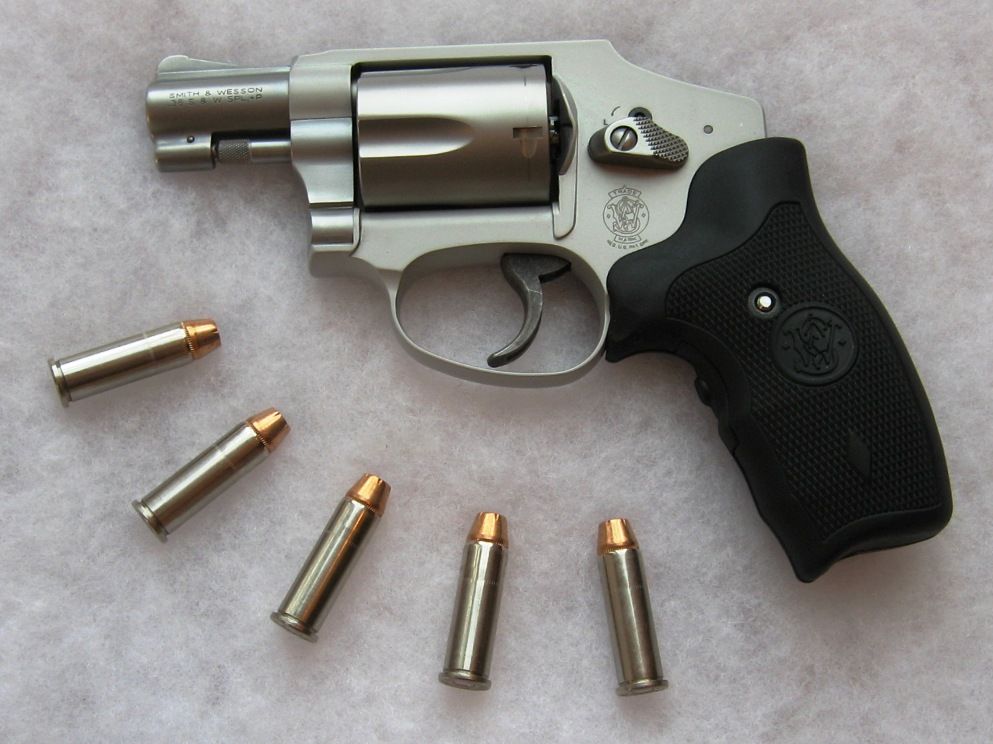
- Concealment Smith & Wesson 642 with Crimson Trace grips
- Type: Revolver
- Place of origin: United States

Production history
- Manufacturer: Smith & Wesson
- Produced: 1952
- Variants: Models 40, 442 and 642

Specifications
- Barrel length: 2 in (51 mm), 3 in (76 mm)
- Cartridge: .22 LR.22 Magnum.32 H&R Magnum.38 Special +P.357 Magnum.356 TSW; 9×19mm
- Action: Double Action Only (DAO) revolver, fully enclosed hammer
- Feed system: Cylinder
- Sights: Fixed sights, front and rear

S&W Centennial is a family of revolvers made by Smith & Wesson on the "J-Frame".

== History ==
The original Centennial Model 40 was introduced in 1952, and was named for the company's 100th anniversary.

== Design ==
Depending upon caliber, the cylinder holds either five (9×19mm Parabellum, .38 Special +P, and .357 Magnum), six (.32 H&R Magnum), seven (.22 Magnum), or eight (.22 LR) cartridges.

Centennials feature a fully enclosed (internal) hammer, which makes them Double Action Only (DAO) firearms. Like all other "J-frame" Smith & Wesson revolvers, they have a swing-out cylinder.

Centennial models have been made in different versions like PD "Personal Defense" and LS "Lady Smith".

=== Limitations (Scandium Versions) ===
Ammunition with bullet weight less than 120 grains (7.8 g) should not be used due to the risk of frame erosion from powder that is still burning after expulsion of the light projectile. Further, recoil may propel the cases of unfired rounds in the cylinder rearward, with enough force to unseat the bullets, causing the cylinder to jam. Accuracy is compromised in these ultra-light revolvers since the barrel is a steel sleeve liner rather than a single solid piece of steel.

== Models ==
=== Model 40 ===
The Smith & Wesson Model 40 originally debuted as the Centennial in 1952 and was renamed the Model 40 in 1957.

The Model 40 is chambered in .38 special and has a five-round capacity. It is a snub-nose revolver with a 1 7/8-inch barrel. It is built on Smith & Wesson's J-frame and weighs 21 oz. empty.

The revolver was made with a grip safety as some shooters could not get used to the idea of firing a revolver without cocking the hammer.

Smith & Wesson reintroduced this model in 2007 as a collector's piece with some models featuring a case hardened finish by Doug Turnbull.

=== Model 42 ===
The Model 42 came out in 1952 as the Airweight Centennial but was changed in 1957 to the Model 42.

The gun was the same design as the Model 40 except the frame was made of an aluminum alloy, resulting in a lower weight than the Model 40. The Model 42 was discontinued in 1974.

=== Model 640 ===
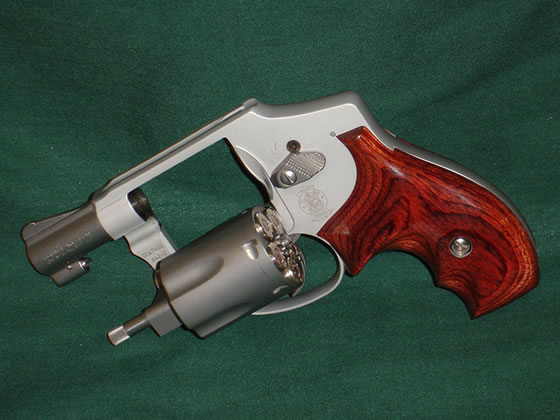
A Smith & Wesson Model 642 revolver with an open cylinder and ergonomic rosewood grips

The Model 640 has been in production since 1990 and was chambered for .38 Special.

It was fitted with a standard barrel of 1-7/8 inch length. The second model had a slightly heavier and longer barrel of 2-1/8 inch length. A 3" barreled version was offered until 1993, when it was dropped from production.

In 1996 S&W began chambering the 640 in .357 Magnum. Because of the power of the .357 magnum cartridge, the frame is strengthened just in front of the cylinder release on those models.

=== Model 442 ===
From 1993 through 1996, the 442 was made with a satin nickel finish.

The 442 has an aluminum frame and blued carbon steel cylinder.

=== Model 642 ===
The 642 has an aluminum frame and stainless steel barrel and cylinder.

==== Model 042 subvariant ====
Smith & Wesson experienced problems matching the color of the clear anodized finish on the alloy frame to the stainless steel barrel and cylinder during the early production of Model 642 revolvers. Those frames were set aside and later black anodized (both matte and polished finishes), with blued steel cylinders and barrels fitted to them. Such frames that had already been model marked with "642" had the "6" over-stamped with a "0." Frames that had not yet been model marked were stamped "042." The resulting Model 042 was produced in 1992 and sold commercially in 1993, but never cataloged by Smith & Wesson. It is considered a transition model to the Model 442, which began production in 1993.

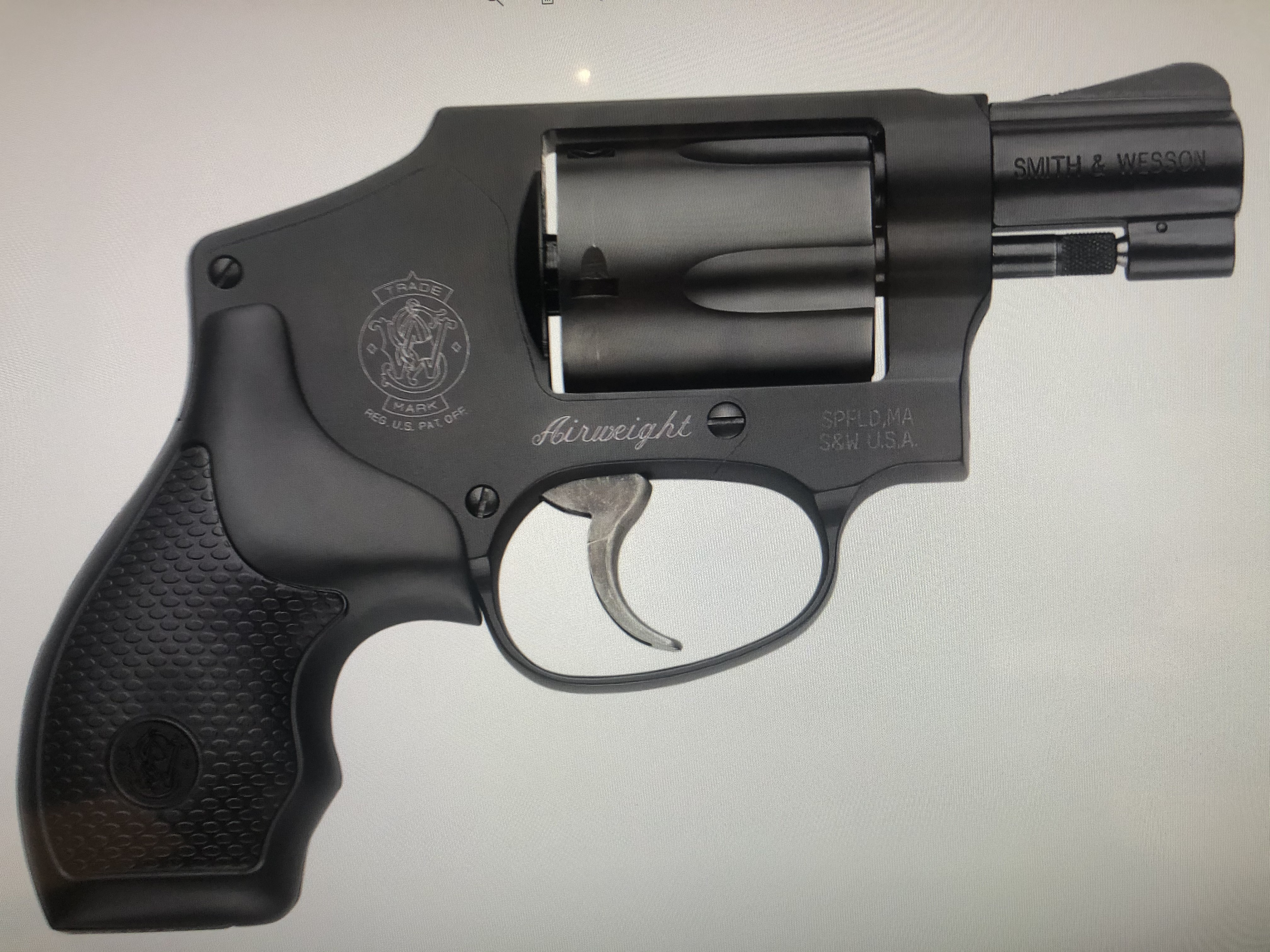

=== Model 940 ===
In 1991 S&W introduced the Model 940, similar in appearance to the 640, but chambered in 9mm Luger.

Use of a moon clip is required to headspace and extract the rimless 9mm cartridges. The 940 could also chamber and extract the short-lived 9mm Federal (9×19mmR) rimmed cartridge.

From 1991 to 1992, a 3-inch barreled version was available. In 1998, the 940 was dropped from production.

In August 2025, Smith & Wesson reintroduced the 940 after a 27-year hiatus.

=== Model 340 ===
In 2001 an aluminium-scandium alloy framed version was introduced in .357 Magnum designated as the Model 340. This revolver weighs 10.9 ounces.

=== Model M&P 342 ===
The model M&P 342 was introduced in 2001 as a special run of revolvers that are identical to a Model 340 but chambered only for .38 Special +P due to some police department ammunition restrictions.
