= Mainspring (firearms) =

Spring which stores the energy required to ignite the primer

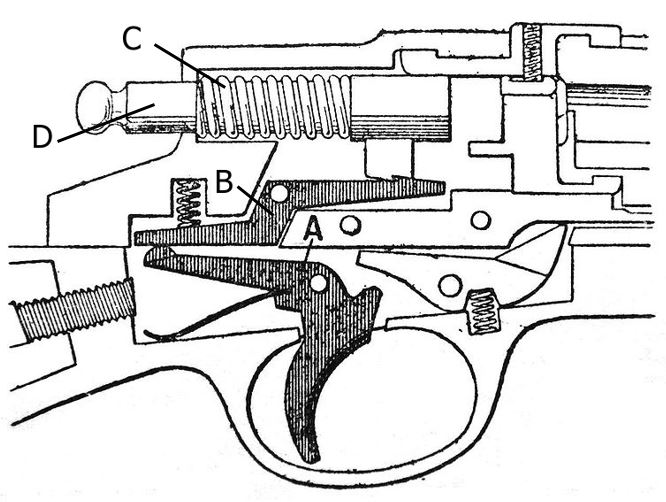
Mainspring on a bolt-action rifle (marked with C)

In firearms, the mainspring is a spring in the firing mechanism which stores the energy required to ignite the primer of the cartridge. The mainspring may be called a striker spring on striker-fired firearms, or hammer spring on hammer-fired firearms. After the trigger mechanism has been released, the tensioned mainspring will drive the firing pin or hit the firing pin so that it is driven.

Mainsprings can come in many shapes, such as a cylindrical spring (Mosin-Nagant, TT-33, Colt M1911), plate spring (Nagant revolver model 1895, Makarov pistol) or spiral spring (Kalashnikov). On a number of automatic firearms, the recoil spring may also function as a mainspring (FN Browning M1900, Degtyaryov machine gun, and some submachine guns).

Mainsprings should not be confused with the type of firing pin spring which is utilised in some designs instead of free-floating firing pins to prevent slamfire.

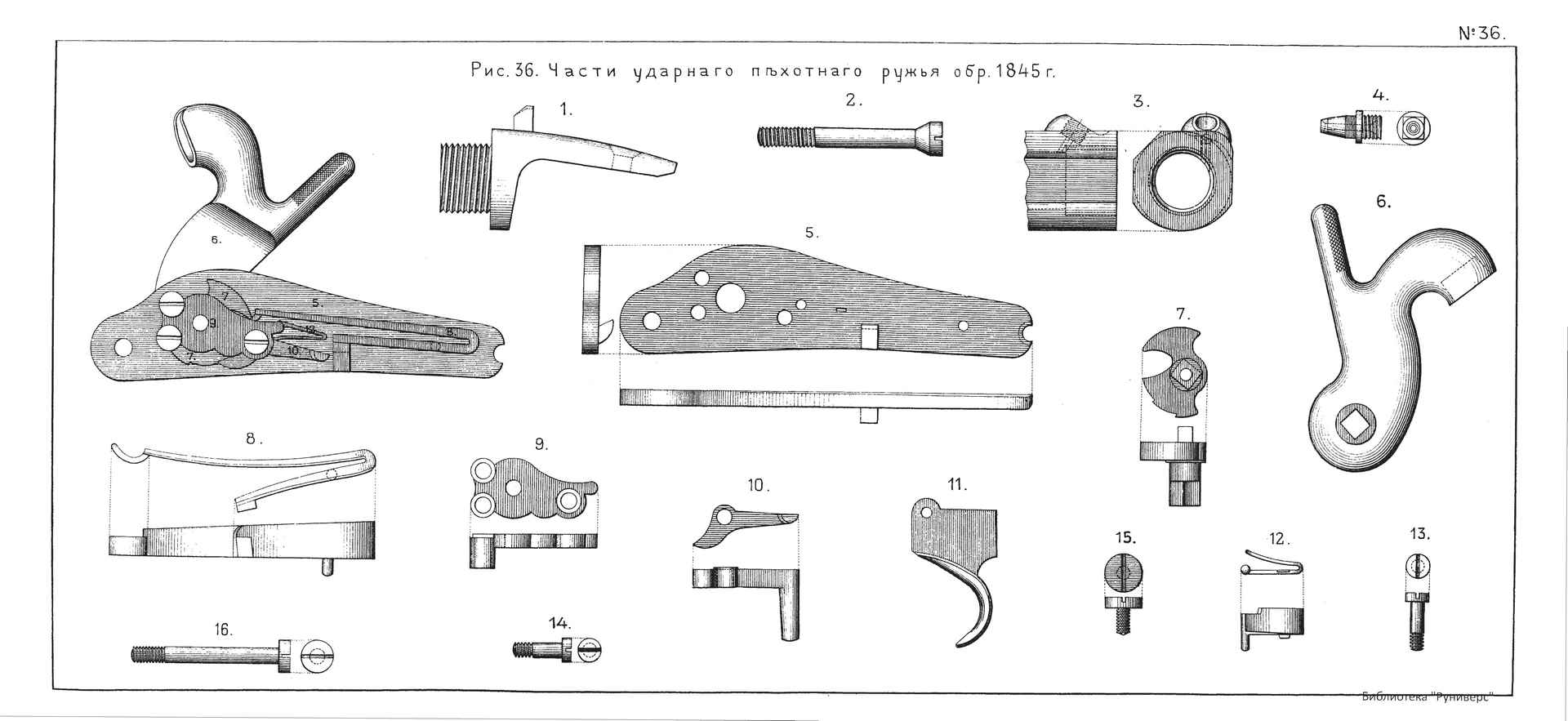
Parts sketch of the firing mechanism on Russian infantry rifle model 1845. Number 8 shows the main spring.

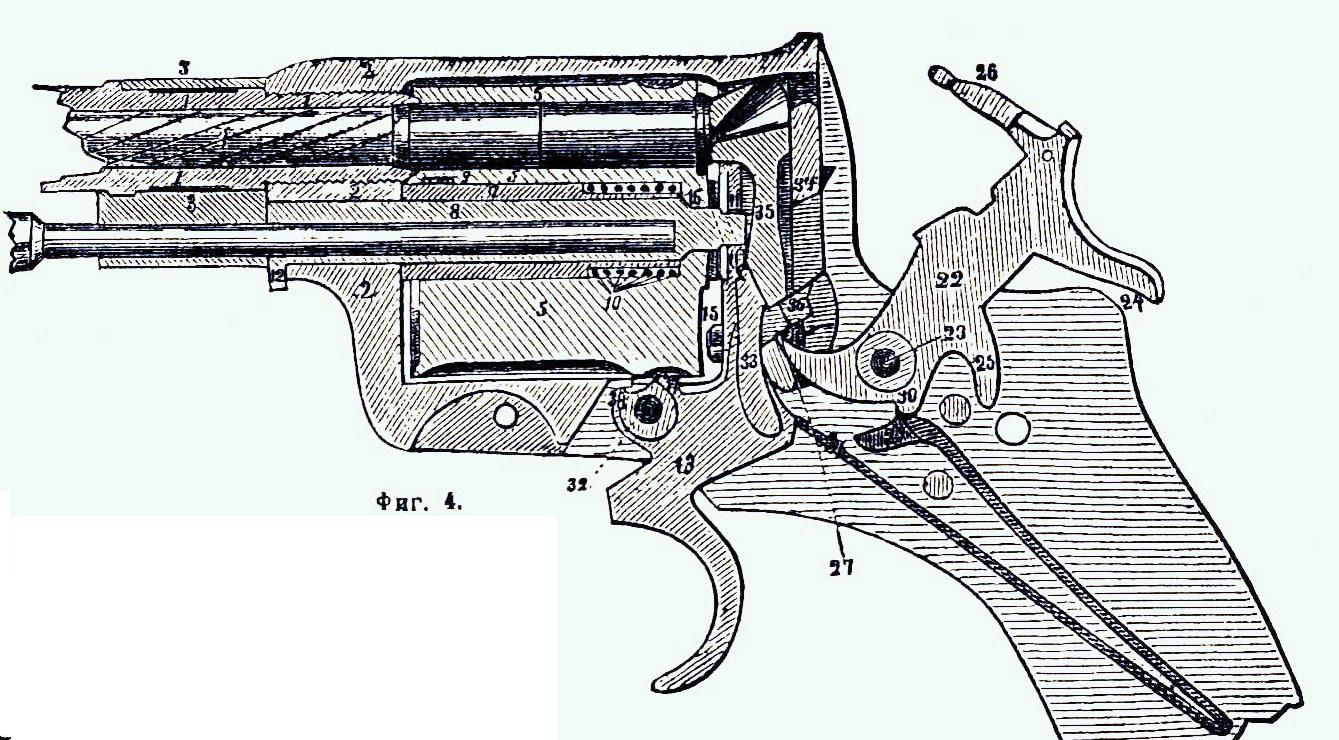
Nagant revolver with tensioned trigger. The mainspring (bottom right) consists of two leaf arms, and also acts as a trigger spring.

== See also ==
- Lock time
