= Cleaning rod =

Tool used for clean firearm bores

A cleaning rod is a firearm maintenance tool that can be used to clean the inside (bore) of a gun's barrel, and is made in different sizes for use on different barrel lengths, calibers and gauges. It is a sturdy, long, thin, straight rod typically made of metal, rigid plastic or carbon fiber, and usually has a handle at one end for gripping and threadings at the other end for attaching cleaning accessories. It is used to push brushes, mops and cotton patches through the bore to deliver solvents and scrub away foulings, or to physically remove any obstructing objects such as a squib load.

Commonly, a breech-end extension tube, known as a bore guide or rod guide, is also used in conjunction with the cleaning rod to prevent cleaning solvent from spilling out into the receiver, and to keep the rod supported and centered inside the bore in order to minimize potential damage to riflings. Similarly, a muzzle guide or muzzle guard might be used if the cleaning rod is to be inserted from the muzzle end of the firearm in order to protect the crown of the muzzle from mechanical damage.

A cleaning cord is an alternative gun care tool to a cleaning rod. A cleaning cord is a flexible fabric cord with a tapered thin end that has a weight attached to it, in order to help the initial feeding of the cord through the breech end of the barrel. When the thin end has been fed throughout the other end, the rest of the cord is then dragged towards the muzzle, scrubbing the bore along the way. A cleaning cord often has one or more integrated brushes to help clear away more stubborn contaminants, and may also be used to apply lubricants.

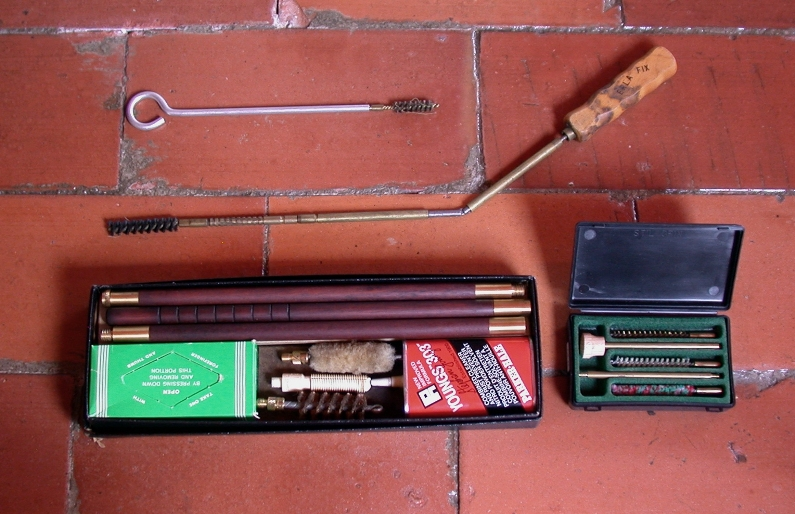
An assortment of cleaning rods: A short cleaning rod with a brass brush attached, a foldable cleaning rod with a nylon brush attached, a cleaning kit for a shotgun (note the thicker rod), and some different brushes.

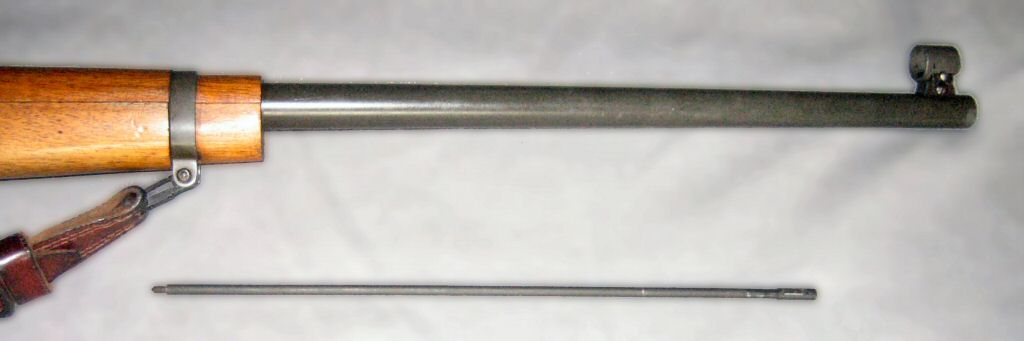
Integrated cleaning rod on a Mauser M59.

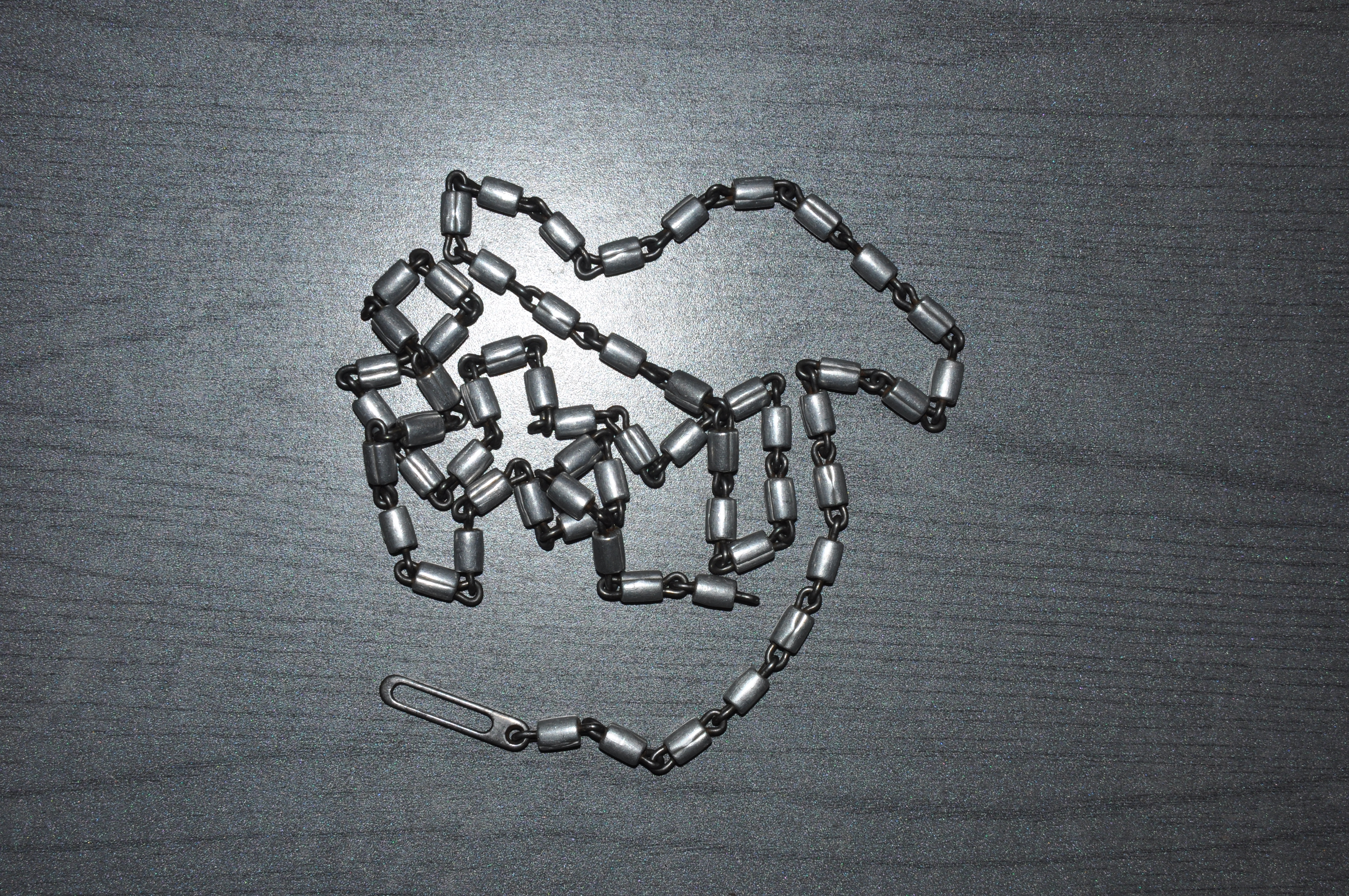
A cleaning cord with a clip at the end for attaching a patch.

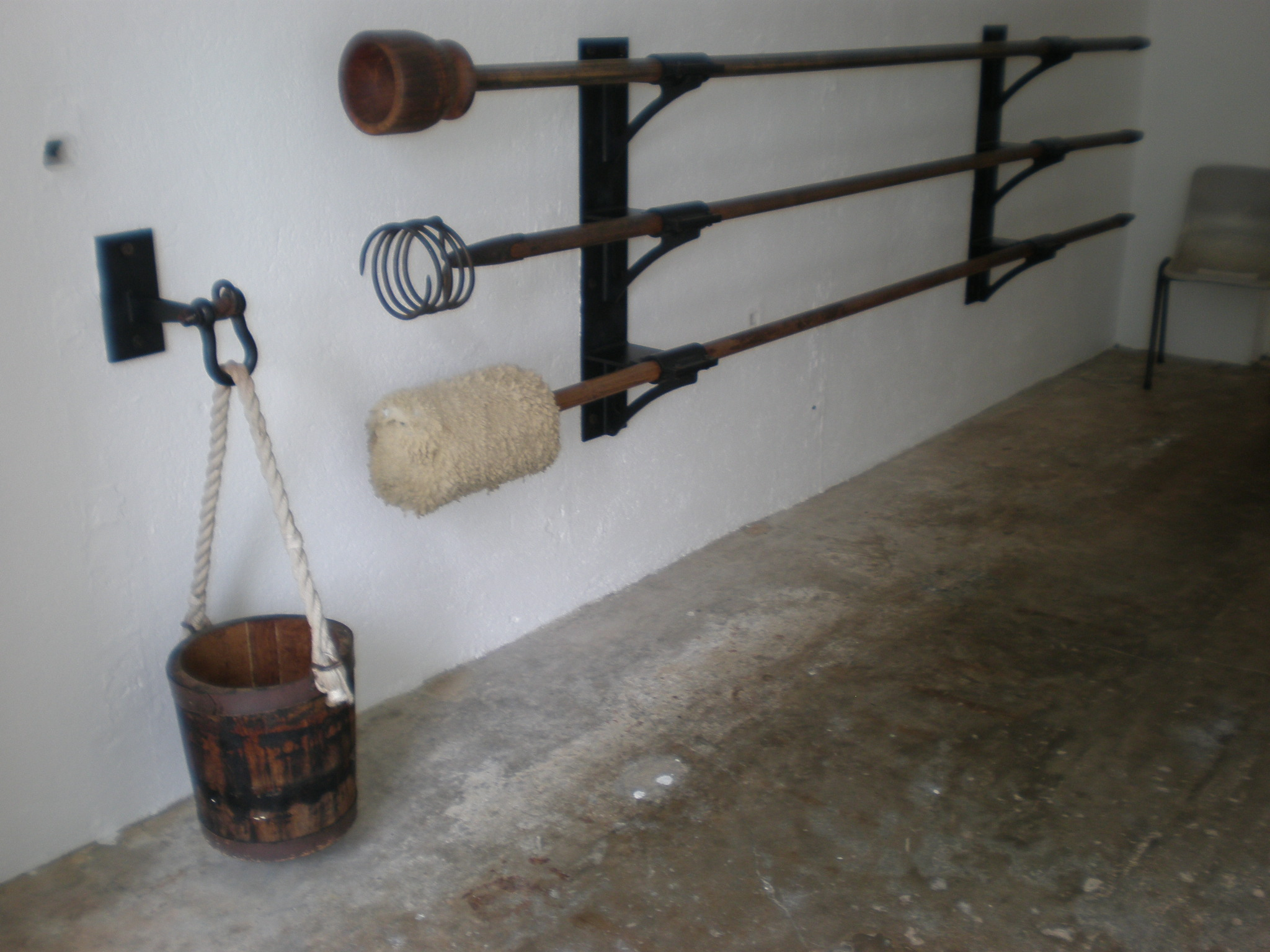
Historical bore cleaning equipment for a cannon.

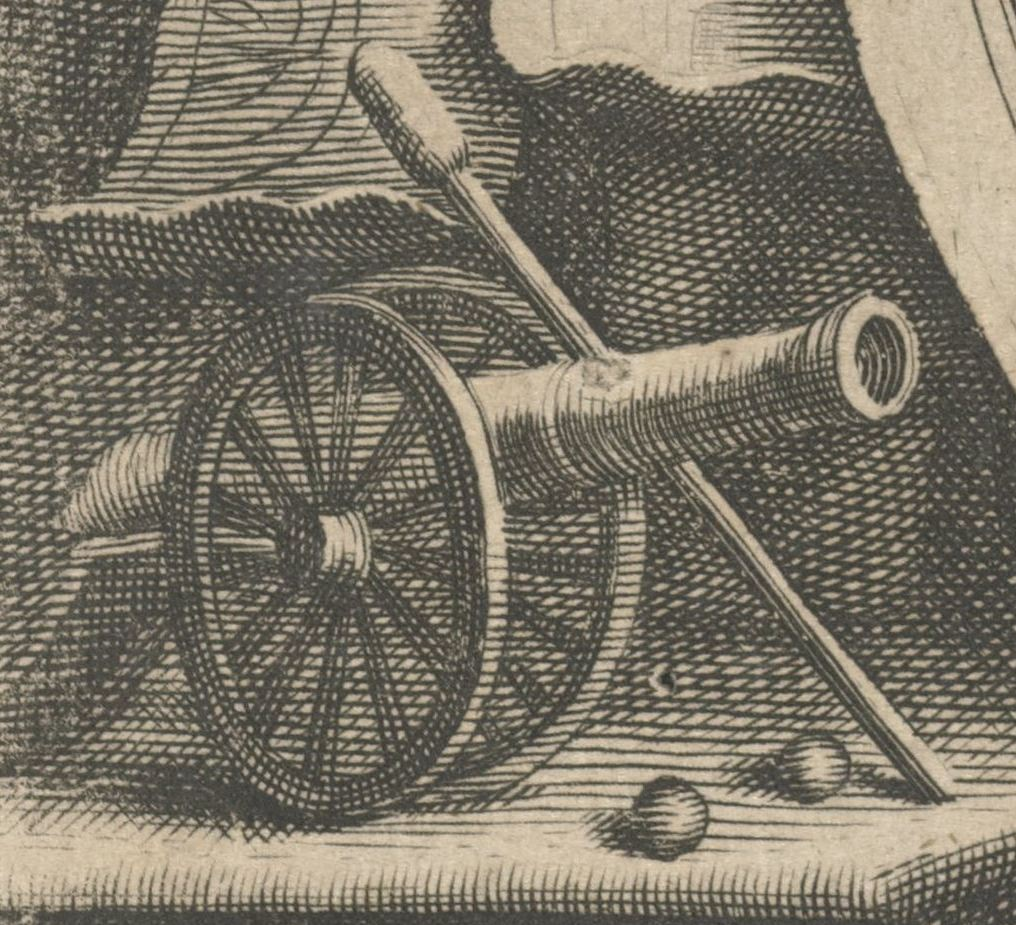
Cannon with cannonballs and cleaning rod, detail from a title page by Reinier van Persijn of the book by C. M. Anhaltin, Slot en sleutel van de groote zee-vaert met een uytschrijvinge van Oost en West, Amsterdam, 1659.

== Thread sizes ==
The screw thread sizes and "genders" used for attaching brushes to the rods vary between different calibers and manufacturers. Some of the most common threads and genders for rods/cords are listed below. Corresponding brushes and other accessories will have the opposite gender.

Rods for .17 to .204 caliber (4.4 to 5.2 mm)

- #5-40 UNC female

Rods for .22 to .50 caliber (5.56 to 12.7 mm)

- #8-32 UNC female (more common)
- #8-36 UNF male (less common)

Rods for shotguns (including 12, 20, 28 and .410 gauge)

- #12-28 UNF male
- 5/16-27 UNC female

== See also ==
- Firearm maintenance
