= Limp wristing =

Malfunction of a semiautomatic firearm due to improper grip

Limp wristing is a phenomenon encountered by semi-automatic pistol shooters, where the shooter's grip is not firm enough and the wrist is not held firm/straight enough to keep the frame of the firearm from traveling rearward while the bolt or slide of the firearm cycles. This condition often results in stovepiping, a type of firearm malfunction.

The functional cause of limp wristing is reduced slide momentum during cycling.

== See also ==
Operation of autoloading firearms
