= Slamfire =

Discharge of a firearm as a cartridge is being loaded into the chamber

Slamfire occurs when the cartridge discharges as soon as it reaches the chamber, rather than waiting in the chamber to receive a firing pin impact when the trigger is pulled.

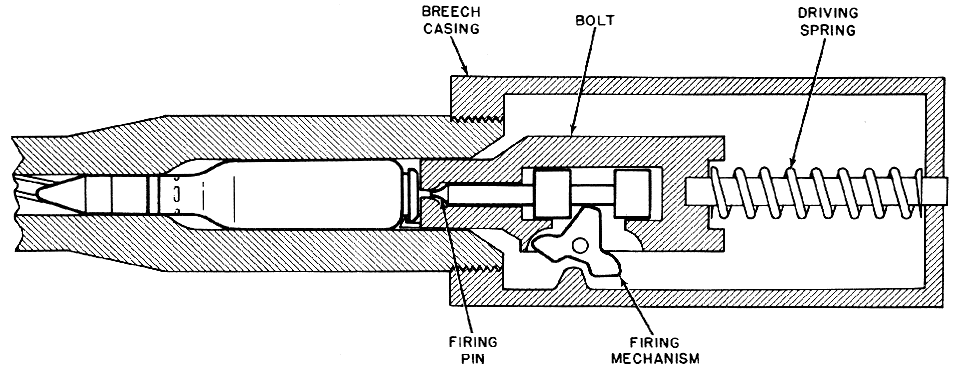
Schematic of an Advanced Primer Ignition blowback operation that works in a similar way to slamfire by striking the cartridge as it is moving forward before it is fully chambered.

A slamfire is a discharge of a firearm occurring as soon as a cartridge is being loaded into the chamber. Some firearms are designed to slamfire, but the term also describes a malfunction of self-loading firearms. Shooters accustomed to firearms requiring trigger activation for discharge may be unprepared for a slamfire discharge.

Some military firearms are designed to fire from an open bolt condition to avoid the unintended discharge of a chambered cartridge cooking off in a gun barrel heated by firing previous cartridges. Activating the trigger of such firearms releases the spring-loaded bolt to move forward stripping a cartridge from the magazine into the chamber. The firing pin impacts the primer as the cartridge is chambered, and the energy released by the discharging cartridge returns the bolt into an open position while ejecting the empty case.

== Unintentional slamfire ==
More conventional self-loading firearms begin this cycle with a cartridge already in the chamber and await activation of the trigger to allow the firing pin to impact the primer, causing discharge and loading another cartridge into the chamber. The first cartridge must be loaded from the magazine by manually pulling back and then releasing the spring-loaded bolt to chamber the cartridge; and unintentional slamfires may occur if the firing pin activates the primer as the first cartridge is being chambered. Unintentional slamfires may also occur during the normal self-loading process following an intended discharge.

Control of firing pin movement is the essential difference between cartridge discharge as the bolt closes, or discharge when the trigger is pulled. Firearms designed to discharge as the bolt closes may have a fixed firing pin or a firing pin which moves forward by inertia as forward motion of the bolt ceases when the cartridge is fully chambered, while more conventional firearms are designed to prevent the firing pin from impacting the primer until the trigger is pulled. Some unintentional slamfires are caused by firing pin malfunction, while others may be attributed to defective cartridges with improperly positioned or unexpectedly sensitive primers.

=== Possible causes ===
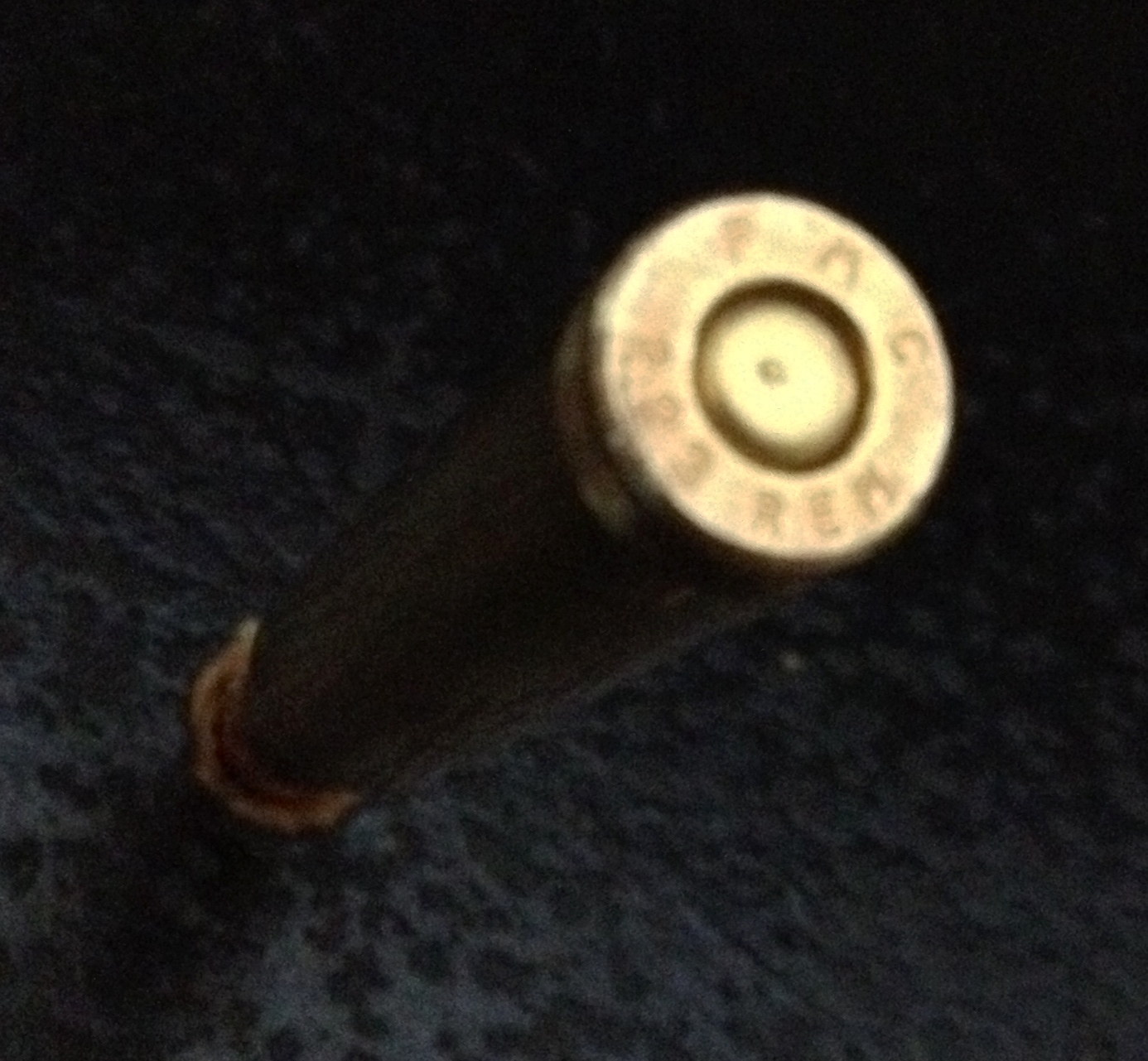
The free-floating firing pin of AR-15 style rifles typically causes an indentation as the firing pin lightly strikes the primer when the bolt closes as it chambers a loaded cartridge. Although a single light indentation may not detonate the primer, the indentation may make the primer more sensitive to subsequent impact. Some shooters avoid using cartridges with primer indentations from being previously loaded but not fired.

Firing pins intended to be activated by a trigger are either spring-loaded or free-floating. Both may move forward during the loading process when the face of the bolt hits the head of the chamber. Although the amount of forward movement is not intended to detonate the primer, slamfires occur when conditions do not match design assumptions.

Cartridges which may be entirely satisfactory in manually loaded firearms may be considered defective if they do not meet the design specifications of self-loading firearms. Primer depth is very important in centerfire ammunition. Most cartridges are assembled with the exposed surface of the primer a specified distance deeper than the base of the cartridge in contact with the bolt face. Primers with insufficient depth may be detonated by the normal amount of firing pin movement as the cartridge is chambered by forward bolt movement. Primer response to impact is a function of the thickness and hardness of the metal cup containing the detonating explosive. Primers intended to respond to the comparatively light firing pin impact of older or smaller manually-loaded firearms may be initiated by the relatively energetic self-loading process necessary to reliably chamber cartridges. Most military ammunition makes use of hard primers unlikely to be detonated by a comparatively light inertial strike. The NATO military alliance uses NATO specific standardization agreements (STANAGs) that define the minimal and maximal allowed primer sensitivity for small arms ammunition. For 5.56×45mm NATO ammunition STANAG 4172, among a considerable number of technical requirements, specifies the permissible primer sensitivity range for 5.56×45mm NATO ammunition.

Spring-loaded firing pins may move further forward than expected during the loading process if the restraining spring is broken or weakened by age. As rust, dirt, fouling, or inappropriately viscous lubricants accumulate in the firing pin channel, both free-floating and spring-loaded firing pins may be held in a forward position protruding from the bolt face. While rust prevention is important, wet lubricants can trap carbon and other pollutants from burning propellant, so avoidance of excess lubrication reduces the risk of slam fires from firing pins becoming stuck forward.

Anything adhering to the tip of a firing pin or the portion of the bolt face behind the primer may cause unexpectedly heavy primer contact during the self-loading process. The larger priming compound distribution area of rimfire ammunition increases the number of locations where dirt or fouling on the bolt face or in the rim portion of the firearm chamber may deform the cartridge rim enough to function as a firing pin during the self-loading process.

=== Risks ===
Unintended slamfires are dangerous, and recoil may cause shooters to lose control of light firearms with conditions causing sequential slamfires if a normally semi-automatic firearm "goes full-auto" unexpectedly. A single defective cartridge may cause a single slamfire, but a firing pin stuck in a forward position or a magazine loaded with defective ammunition may cause a round to fire every time the bolt closes until the magazine is empty.

Shooters must keep the firearm pointed in a safe direction ("downrange") while closing the bolt and chambering a cartridge. If a slamfire does occur, the shooter must do his or her best to hold the firearm securely pointed in a safe direction until it ceases firing. This requires discipline, because untrained shooters may become surprised and instinctively drop the firearm as soon as it begins firing.

Aside from the dangers of any accidental discharge, an out-of-battery ignition may occur if a round slamfires before it is completely secured in the chamber. The firearm may be damaged or destroyed by a breech explosion potentially injuring the shooter and bystanders.

== Intentional slamfire designs ==
Pipe guns use a free floating gun barrel with a rimmed cartridge (usually a shotgun shell) inserted in the breech, sliding within a pipe functioning as a tubular receiver with a fixed firing pin in the back. No trigger or lockwork is required, because the loaded barrel is simply inserted into the pipe and slammed backward to fire. Some use improvised detachable magazines.

== See also ==
- Advanced primer ignition
- Bump stock
- Firearm malfunction
- Glossary of firearms terms
- Glossary of military abbreviations
- List of established military terms
- Recoil operation
