= Taurus PT24/7 =

Taurus PT 24/7
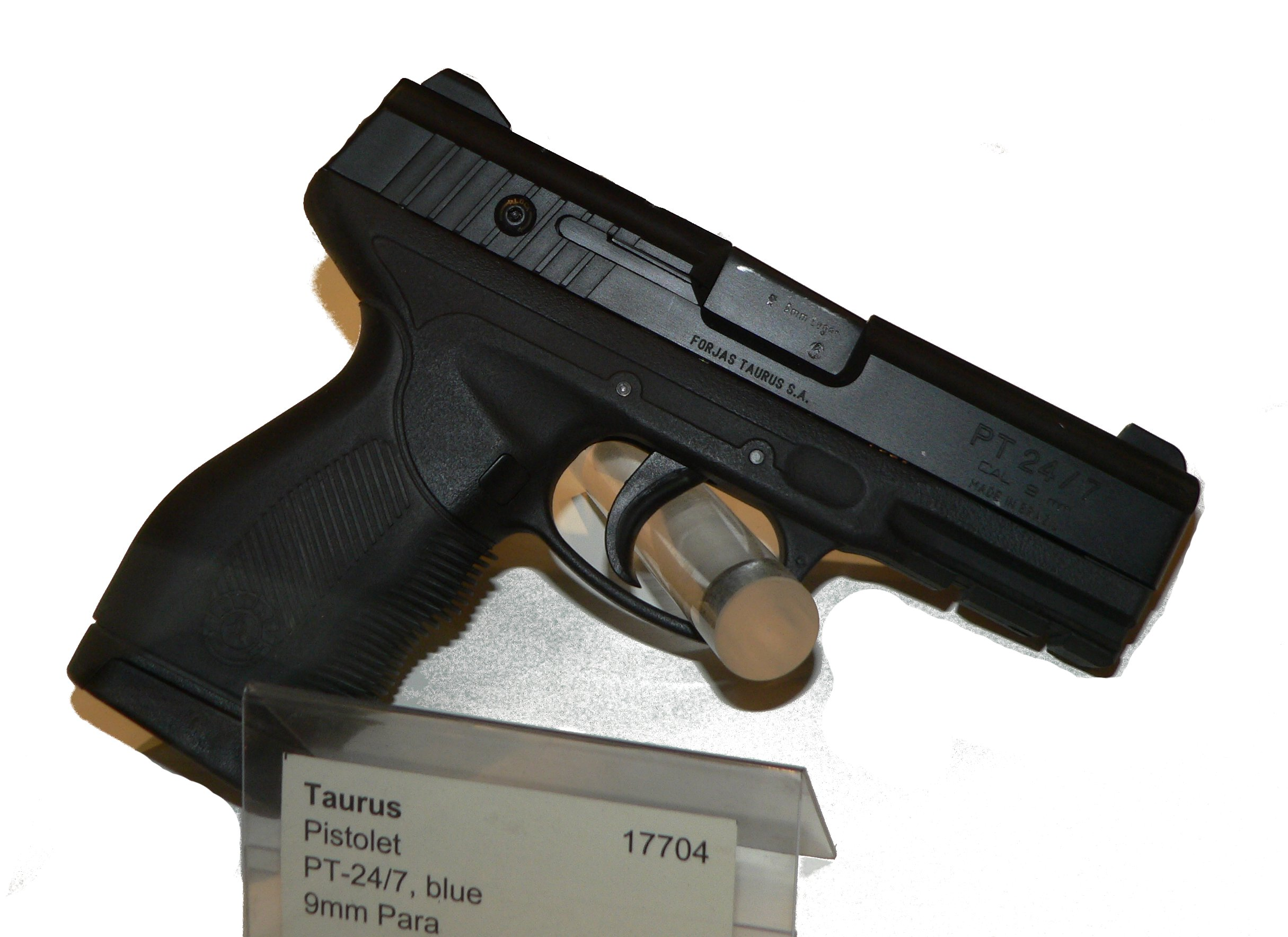
- 9×19 Parabellum Taurus PT 24/7 with blued steel slide
- Type: Semi-automatic pistol
- Place of origin: Brazil

Service history
- Used by: See Users

Production history
- Manufacturer: Forjas Taurus S/A
- Produced: 2004 – c. 2016–2017
- Variants: See Models

Specifications
- Barrel length: 3.25 inch (Compact); 4.20 inch (Standard); 5.25 inch (OSS)
- Cartridge: 9×19mm Parabellum; .40 S&W; .45 ACP
- Action: short recoil
- Feed system: detachable magazine
- Sights: Iron open fixed 1 and 3 dot; Optional night sights; Heine 'Straight-8' (Pro series)

The Taurus PT 24/7 is a semi-automatic pistol using the short type of recoil operation, and available in various models with double-action-only (DAO) and double action/single-action-type trigger actions.

== History ==
PT 24/7 pistols are manufactured by Forjas Taurus S/A (Taurus Forge) in Porto Alegre Brazil and distributed in the United States by their subsidiary Taurus USA.

The 24/7 product line was designed for the civilian concealed carry firearms market, and as backup weapons for law enforcement officers.

As of April 2017, the manufacturer's website says that it is no longer being made. It has been superseded by the 24/7/G2.

== Design ==
The 24/7 pistol features a hammerless, striker-fired design and an injection molded polymer frame with blued carbon steel, stainless steel, or titanium slides.

Available cartridge chamberings include 9×19mm Parabellum, .40 Smith & Wesson, and .45 ACP. Magazine capacities vary between 6, 10, 12, 14, 15 and 17 rounds depending on model and caliber.

24/7 pistols are also equipped with a visible/tactile loaded chamber indicator and a dust cover Picatinny accessory rail integration system, allowing for the attachment of accessories such as laser sights or tactical lights.

Sights on 24/7 pistols vary by model, basic models are equipped with fixed open iron sights with a single high contrast/visibility dot on the front sight. Three-dot sights and Heinie ‘Straight Eight’ combat sights are available for the Pro and OSS models, as well as Tritium night sights.

Handling characteristics of 24/7 pistols are enhanced by features such as an ambidextrous decocking lever and ergonometric design which Taurus calls 'Memory pads', consisting of various grooves which promote proper consistent hand placement for superior handling control.

In addition, a secure grasp of the pistol grip is afforded by a high adhesion gripping surface. An option on selected basic 24/7 pistols and standard on Pro models is a soft, ribbed, non-slip, hand-conforming grip which Taurus dubbed the ‘Ribber’.

=== Safety ===
The PT 24/7 pistols share several safety innovations with other Taurus product lines, including a positive firing pin block as well as the 'Taurus Safety Latch', a transfer bar safety which prevents firing of the pistol unless the trigger is pulled.

Together these safeties assure that the pistol will not fire if it is accidentally dropped; selected models have been certified as satisfying the California drop safety requirement.

All 24/7 models also include a frame-mounted manual safety lever, and are equipped with an integrated firearm locking safety system, which Taurus calls the ‘Taurus Security System' (TSS).

=== Trigger actions ===
The earlier standard versions of the 24/7 pistol came equipped with single-action-only triggers (after a long "take-up"), as once the slide is "racked," the firing pin/striker is made ready for firing and there is no mechanism to release it aside from pulling the trigger.

This system differs from most dual-action triggers in that the initial pull is single-action with the double-action coming into play only on a misfire.

Most dual-action triggers are double-action on the initial shot, with subsequent shots being single-action. This system allows for two major advantages; one being that the initial trigger pull is light and crisp, therefore more controllable, and the second being that if a round misfires, the trigger can be quickly pulled again in double-action mode, repeating the attempt to fire the recalcitrant round.

This type of SA/DA system, pioneered on Taurus pistols, is much faster and simpler than the standard tap, rack, bang method of clearing a dud cartridge.

The later Pro "DS" models and some of the "OSS" pistols sport a de-cocking lever to safely release the striker, even on a live round, thus requiring a double-action pull for the first shot.

This feature gives the shooter the option of utilizing the pistol in a more traditional DA/SA manner, which will, of course, still default to double-action should a cartridge fail to fire.

== OSS series ==
=== History ===
The United States Special Operations Command (USSOCOM) issued requirements in 2005 for a new .45 ACP service pistol and requested interested firearms manufacturers to submit models for field trial testing.

With a large U.S. government defense contract for as many as 650,000 pistols and related accessories in the balance, Taurus was one of many companies to respond, submitting an upgraded 24/7 design they dubbed the ‘OSS’ model.

When the USSOCOM request was at first delayed, and eventually indefinitely shelved, Taurus decided to offer its submission to the civilian marketplace where it garnered much attention and popularity, eventually winning the National Rifle Association of America (NRA) Handgun of the Year award in 2005.

=== Design ===
The OSS models feature a 5.25 inch match grade forged barrel and a 3 position safety system - the bottom position enables the pistol to fire, the middle setting puts it in 'safe' condition, and the upper decocks the striker.

This arrangement results in several carry options for the user as the gun can be carried with a round in the chamber ‘cocked and locked’ in ‘Condition one’ (striker cocked with safety on), or the arguably safer ‘Condition Two’ (striker decocked and safety off, requiring a revolver-like DA pull to both cock and fire the pistol), or even with the striker decocked and the safety on.

The OSS retains the loaded chamber indicator of the other 24/7 models, and additionally allows visual verification that the pistol is ready to fire as the striker can be seen when the pistol is cocked.

== Recall ==
In 2016, the PT24/7 was included in the settlement of a lawsuit which alleged that it, and certain other Taurus handguns, could fire accidentally if dropped and that Taurus covered up the safety defects.

Without admitting guilt, the company paid $39 million, extended the warranties, and recalled the pistols for repair.

== Operators ==
- Brazil
  - Law enforcement in Brazil
- Philippines
  - Bureau of Jail Management and Penology
    - 70 units of .40 caliber
- Sri Lanka
  - Sri Lanka Army Commando Regiment

== See also ==
- List of firearms
