= Academic probation =

Probationary period for new academic staff

The academic standing of both staff and students can influence their progression through the university. For staff, academic probation is an opportunity to demonstrate that their performance meets certain standards that a university might set, while for students a slip in performance might cause them to enter a period of scholastic probation.

== Academic probation ==
Academic probation in the United Kingdom is a period served by a new academic staff member at a university or college when they are first given their job. It is specified in the conditions of employment of the staff member, and may vary from person to person and from institution to institution. In universities founded prior to the Further and Higher Education Act 1992, it is usually three years for academic staff and six months to a year for other staff. In the universities created by that Act, and in colleges of higher education, the period is generally just a year across the board, for both academic and other staff.

Probation is generally monitored by a probationary supervisor, who meets with the probationer both formally, for formal reviews, and informally over the probation period. This is not the same role as a mentor, whose task is to provide consultation and advice during the first few months of a staff member's employment. Typical tasks performed by a mentor, when not performed by people such as a departmental officer nominated for the purpose, are things such as pointing out departmental health and safety information (such as fire drills, for example). The probationary supervisor, in contrast, follows the organization's formal probation scheme, monitoring the probationer's work; setting out work goals, standards of work, and training needs; and organizing reviews to ensure that standards are met and goals are achieved.

Lecturers
Probationary period to be three years with possible extension to four years in doubtful cases. Training procedures to be improved with thorough review prior to confirmation on the basis of revised and improved procedures and criteria.

— Academic and Related Salaries settlement 1971, Circular to Deans of School, University of Dundee

The extended length of the probationary period in universities prior to the FHE Act 1992 is the result of an agreement made in 1974 between the University Authorities Panel and the Association of University Teachers, the Academic and Related Salaries Settlement. The working party that formed the agreement stated that the purpose of academic probation was to decide, at the end of the probationary period whether a member of staff should be retained, and that this decision is based upon "the long-term interests of the university itself, of the other members of its staff, and of its students". The working group set out several criteria that a probationer was expected to satisfy:

- The probationer must have satisfactorily performed all teaching, tutorial, and supervisory work assigned to him/her.
- The probationer must have satisfactorily engaged in the research work in his/her subject.
- The probationer must have properly carried out all examination and administrative duties assigned to him/her.
- The probationer must have shown promise, through his/her work, of continuing development as teacher and scholar.

It was decided that in practice, evaluating whether a probationer satisfied such criteria would take at least three years, although it was possible for it to take just one or two in rare, exceptional, cases. Also, stipulated by the agreement was that completion of academic probation at one university should count towards probation at other institutions, and that it was unreasonable to impose second or third probationary periods.

However, this stipulation does not cover the shorter, one year, probationary period used by universities that came after the FHA Act 1992. That shorter period resulted from a 1990/1991 agreement between teaching unions and the then polytechnics and colleges that were later to become universities under the Act. It was modified by various local agreements with individual institutions. (Middlesex University, for example, has an eight-month academic probation period as a result of a local agreement.) In such universities, the focus of academic probation is less upon the performance research and other scholarly work, and more upon the performance of teaching work. The universities can, for example, require several formal observations of a probationer's teaching practices, for assessment and review. (Middlesex University requires two, for example.)

== Scholastic probation ==
Scholastic probation, sometimes known as flunking out, is the formal warning that is given to students at a higher educational institution as the result of poor academic achievement. Normally, if students that are on academic probation do not quickly address their grades and improve their GPA to at least a 2.0, more serious consequences may occur, which are not limited to academic suspension.
