= Out-of-battery =

Firearm state

Out-of-battery refers to the status of a firearm before the action has returned to the normal firing position.

== Description ==
The term originates from artillery, referring to a gun that fires before it has been pulled back.

In artillery guns, "out of battery" usually refers to a situation where the recoiling mass (breech and barrel) has not returned to its proper position after firing because of a failure in the recoil mechanism. Most gun carriage designs should prevent this; however, if a gun is fired out of battery, then damage to the carriage can occur, as the effectiveness of the recoil mechanism will have been compromised.

In firearms and artillery where there is an automatic loading mechanism, a condition can occur in which a live round is at least partially in the firing chamber and capable of being fired, but is not properly secured by the operating mechanism, known as the bolt in handheld firearms, of that particular weapon. The gas pressure produced at the moment of firing can rupture the not fully supported cartridge case and can result in flame and high-pressure gas being vented at the breech of the weapon, potentially creating flying fragments and possibly injuring the operator. Out-of-battery firings can be initiated by a deliberate action by the operator (i.e. pulling the trigger) or initiated involuntarily as part of a slamfire.

In handheld firearms, damage from out-of-battery discharges often destroy the firearm's magazine and destroy or severely damage the receiver, bolt, firing pin, operating springs, and stock. Extreme damage to cartridge casings, such as blown case heads, are indicative of out of battery firings in addition to damages sustained by the firearm itself. Operator injuries from out-of-battery discharges often include cuts and velocity wounds to the hands, arms, and face. Shooters without eye protection have a high risk of sustaining critical and permanent eye damage from out-of-battery discharges. In some cases, more serious injuries and even death have been caused by out-of-battery discharges. However, in most firearms designs, most of the blast from the cartridge is contained by the receiver and will not seriously injure a shooter with sufficient eye protection, but can be of greater danger to nearby observers especially ones without eye protection.

Depending on the design, it is also possible for a semi-automatic handgun to simply not fire upon pulling the trigger when in an out-of-battery state. Some firearms incorporate deliberate design elements to avoid out-of-battery discharges. Out-of-battery discharges almost always involve semi-automatic or fully-automatic firearms, but they are possible with manually operated firearms such as lever-actions and bolt-actions, yet extremely rare. Understanding and identifying out-of-battery conditions before they can result in an out-of-battery discharge is an important safety skill for both shooters and observers.

== See also ==
- Glossary of firearms terms
- Glossary of military abbreviations
- List of established military terms
