= Firearm malfunction =

Failure of a firearm to operate as intended

A firearm malfunction is the failure of a firearm to operate as intended for causes other than user error. Malfunctions range from temporary and relatively safe situations, such as a casing that did not eject, to potentially dangerous occurrences that may permanently damage the gun and cause injury or death. Improper handling of certain types of malfunctions can be very dangerous. Following gun safety rules can prevent firearm malfunctions, and limit the damage inflicted by them if they do occur. Proper cleaning and maintenance of a firearm play a big role in preventing malfunctions.

== Cartridge malfunctions ==
=== Case head separation ===
Case head separation occurs when the walls of the casing become thin or fatigued. Upon firing the round, the case separates into two pieces near the head. It is not uncommon with brass that has been reloaded several times.

=== Dud ===
A dud (also a misfire or failure to fire) occurs when the trigger is pulled but the primer or powder in the cartridge malfunctions, causing the firearm not to discharge. Dud rounds can still be dangerous and should be deactivated and disposed of properly.

=== Hang fire ===
A hang fire (also delayed discharge) is an unexpected delay between the triggering of a firearm and the ignition of the propellant. Whenever a firearm fails to fire, but has not clearly malfunctioned, a hang fire should be suspected. When this occurs, the correct procedure is to keep the firearm pointed downrange or in a safe direction for thirty to sixty seconds, then remove and safely discard the round (which is now a dud as explained above if the primer was struck, otherwise the gun itself may have malfunctioned). The reason for this is that a round functioning outside of the firearm, or in the firearm with the action open (out-of-battery discharge), could cause a serious fragmentation hazard.

=== Squib load ===
A squib load (also squib round, squib, squib fire, insufficient discharge, incomplete discharge) is an extremely dangerous malfunction that happens when a fired projectile does not carry enough force and becomes stuck in the gun barrel instead of exiting it. In the case of semi-automatic or automatic weapons, this can cause subsequent rounds to impact the projectile obstructing the barrel, which may cause a catastrophic failure of the structural integrity of the firearm, posing a threat to the operator or bystanders. The bullet from a squib stuck in the barrel must never be cleared by subsequently attempting to fire a live or blank round in the weapon. Blank rounds use a type of powder different from that of other rounds, and generate much more pressure, which, combined with the presence of the projectile obstructing the barrel, may cause the firearm to catastrophically fail.

=== Light primer strike ===
A light primer strike is a failure to fire as a result of the firing pin not striking the primer of a cartridge hard enough. A possible reason could be because of the firing pin spring of a gun being too stiff to not release the sufficient power to strike the primer and ignite the gunpowder. A light primer strike will result in a dead trigger and the gun will not cycle. This malfunction is not to be mistaken with a squib load which the gunpowder is ignited and the bullet fires, but is trapped in the barrel of a gun. A light primer strike will not have expanding gases as a squib load would produce as sign that there is one. A cartridge with a light primer strike will still have an indent on the primer as a result from the firing pin striking on the casing.

=== Cook-off ===
A cook-off or thermally-induced firing, when taking place within a firearm, is the unintended discharge of a round due to heat; in this sense, this almost always is due to an overheated chamber, so much so that whatever casing the rounds may have proves insufficient to prevent the primer or powder immediately igniting due to said heat. Certain varieties of early caseless ammunition were known to be extremely vulnerable to this phenomenon, due to the lack of a casing's simultaneous heat-shielding and heat-sinking properties. In an automatic weapon, a cook-off may trigger a dangerous condition known as runaway fire, detailed below; cook-offs may also trigger out-of-battery ignition.

Cook-offs may also happen outside of a firearm due to external heating; external cook-offs are not considered a firearm malfunction but are no less dangerous, for obvious reasons.

== Mechanical malfunctions ==
Mechanical malfunctions of a firearm (commonly called jams) include failures to feed, extract, or eject a cartridge; failure to fully cycle after firing; and failure of a recoil- or gas-operated firearm to lock back when empty (largely a procedural hazard, as "slide lock" is a visual cue that the firearm is empty). In extreme cases, an overloaded round, blocked barrel, poor design, or severely weakened breech can result in an explosive failure of the receiver, barrel, or other parts of the firearm.

=== Failure to feed ===
Failure to feed (FTF) is when a firearm fails to feed the next round into the firing chamber. Failure to feed is common when a shooter using a semi-automatic firearm does not hold the firearm correctly (for example, by limp wristing a pistol), when the slide is not fully cycled by the preceding round, or due to problems with the magazine. It can also be caused by worn recoil springs, buffer springs, or simply a dirty feed ramp or a magazine that isn't fully seated.

=== Rim lock ===
Rim lock is where the rim of the shell casing gets caught on the extractor groove of the casing underneath it. It is a common issue for calibers with large rims, such as 7.62×54mmR, or guns that have been rechambered for cartridges shorter than intended without replacing the original magazine with one that compensates for the shorter round.

=== Hammer follow ===
Hammer follow occurs when the disconnector allows the hammer to follow the bolt and firing pin into battery, sometimes causing the firing mechanism to function without pulling the trigger. This is usually a result of extreme wear or outright breakage of firing mechanism components and can result in uncontrollable "full-auto" operation, in which multiple rounds are discharged following a single pull of the trigger. It is a problem not limited to old guns and may occur in any rifle, even those in good condition. It is more common in newer guns when the firearm has not been shot. It is not a terribly rare occurrence, and the results can be deadly.

=== Slamfire ===
A slamfire is a premature, unintended discharge of a firearm that occurs as a round is being loaded into the chamber, when the bolt "slams" forward (hence the name), as a result of the firing pin having not been retracted into the bolt, or from the firing pin being carried forward by the momentum of returning to battery. Similar to a hammer follow malfunction, this can result in uncontrollable "full-auto" operation.

Conversely, however, the term can also refer to a deliberate operation of a manually-cycled firearm that lacks a trigger disconnector, cycling the action while holding the trigger to achieve a much higher rate-of-fire than the normal manual of arms would permit; a famous example being the Winchester Model 1897 pump-action shotgun. This is not considered a weapon malfunction.

=== Failure to extract ===
A failure to extract occurs when the casing of the just-fired round is not successfully extracted from the chamber. This can be caused by an overly-dirty chamber, broken extractor claw, case rim failures, or several other causes.

=== Failure to eject ===
A failure to eject (FTE) occurs when the casing of the just-fired round is extracted from the chamber, but is not ejected from the firearm, causing the next round to fail to feed, or the slide/bolt to fail to return to battery. A stovepipe is common type of FTE. Firearms without a dedicated extractor or ejector (like the USFA Zip .22) may eject erratically, resulting in spent casings not clearing the action during ejection. Such improper ejections are functionally identical to standard FTE scenarios.

=== Stovepipe ===
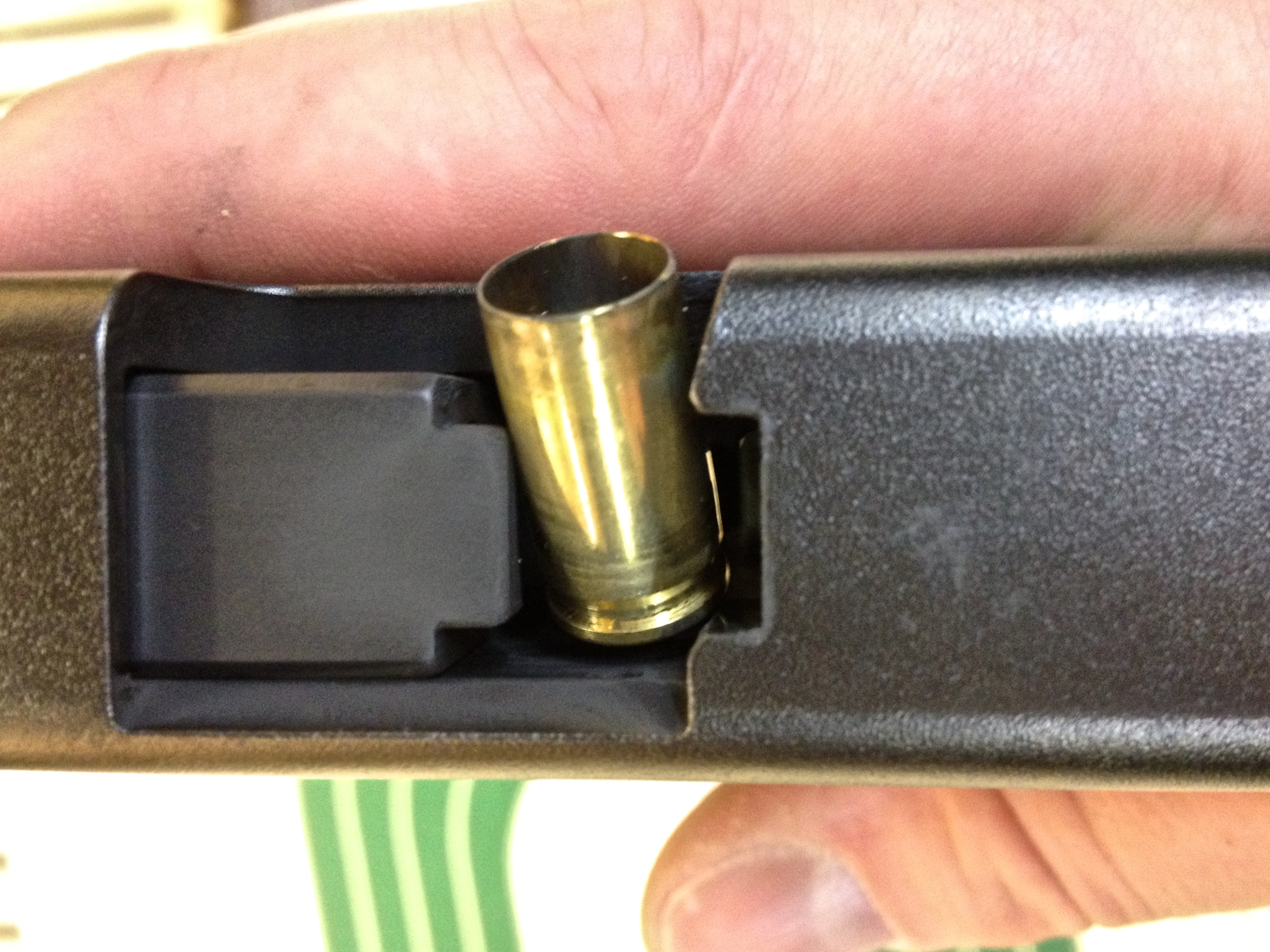
Failure to eject (FTE, "stovepipe") in a semi-automatic pistol.

A stovepipe or smokestack can occur in bolt-action, pump-action, lever-action, semi-automatic, and fully automatic firearms that fire from a closed bolt, when an empty cartridge case gets caught partway out of the ejection port instead of being thrown clear. Stovepipes can be caused by a malfunctioning or defective extractor or ejector, or when the shooter does not hold the firearm firmly enough for the action to function fully, known as limp wristing, or due to reloads that are not sufficiently powerful to fully cycle the action, etc.

=== Double feed ===
A double feed occurs when two rounds are picked up from the magazine and both are moved to be fed into the chamber at the same time. This is usually due to a bad magazine but can also be the result of a bad recoil spring. It can also occur as a consequence of incorrectly clearing a stovepipe jam.

=== Out-of-battery ignition ===
A firearm is "in-battery" when the slide/bolt is in the normal firing position. A firearm is "out-of-battery" when the slide/bolt/action is not fully seated in the normal firing position, typically because it did not cycle fully after firing (called "returning to battery"). Most modern firearms are designed to not be capable of firing when significantly out-of-battery. As such, a firearm that is out-of-battery typically cannot be fired, which is why this is a type of firearm malfunction.

A dangerous situation can occur when a chambered round fires when the firearm is out-of-battery (called an out-of-battery discharge). The cartridge casing is not sufficiently strong to contain the pressure of firing by itself; it relies on the walls of the chamber and the bolt face to help contain the pressure. When the firearm is out-of-battery, the round is not fully chambered, or the bolt face is not against the rear of the cartridge, and if the round is fired in this situation, the case will fail, causing high-pressure hot gases, bits of burning propellant, and fragments of the casing itself to be thrown at high speed from the firearm. This can be a serious hazard to the operator of the firearm and any bystanders.

=== Runaway fire ===
Runaway fire is a malfunction specific to firearms capable of automatic operation, referring to an automatic firearm failing to cease fire immediately upon release of the trigger. This can happen due to multiple different factors, such as poor firearm condition or design (for example, a worn fire-control group, detritus in the trigger, or a worn trigger sear), cook-offs, electronics failures, or other such mishaps.

Runaway fire can manifest as a momentary delay of the cessation of fire after trigger release (in a way that is counter to the firearm's normal operation), or in the worst possible cases, the weapon may continue to fire with no trigger input until its ammunition runs out.

An automatic firearm continuing to fire with unintended but continuous trigger input is not runaway fire; that is instead a negligent discharge, a user error, not a firearm malfunction.

== Prevention ==
Some mechanical malfunctions are caused by poor design and cannot easily be avoided. Some malfunctions with cartridges can be attributed to poor quality or damaged ammunition (often due to improper storage, handling or exposure to moisture). Many malfunctions, however, can be prevented by proper cleaning and maintenance of the firearm.

== See also ==
- Tap, rack, bang
