= Tap, rack, bang =

Jargon for quick response to firearm malfunction

Tap, rack, bang (TRB) or tap, rack, and go (TRG) is jargon for the response to a failure to fire in a firearm with a removable magazine. This is designated as an "Immediate Action" and involves no investigation of the cause (due to being under fire in a combat or defensive situation), but is effective for common failures, such as defective or improperly seated ammunition magazines.

1. Tap – tap the magazine. This is to ensure that the magazine is properly/completely inserted in the firearm so that it feeds properly. As typically taught in tactical firearms courses, the "tap" is applying pressure on the floor plate of the magazine to lock it into place. It does not constitute 'smacking' the magazine, as this can irreversibly damage the magazine's lip.
2. Rack – pull back sharply and then quickly release the cocking handle/slide of the firearm. This will eject a misfired round, which could be a possible cause of the stoppage, and chamber the next round.
3. Bang/Go – aim and fire the firearm again. If the firearm again does not fire or fails to extract the spent round, it may indicate a more serious problem with the firearm, requiring maintenance. For instance, if the firing pin is too lightly striking the primer on a cartridge, it may indicate a worn-out spring or firing pin.

Some failures, such as a "stovepipe", require more complicated maintenance that requires investigation of the underlying problem, or remedial action. With issues such as a squib load or hang fire, the "tap, rack, bang" procedure should not be used.

== See also ==
- Glossary of firearms terms
- Glossary of military abbreviations
- List of established military terms
