= Flame cutting (firearms) =

Destructive firearms phenomenon

Flame cutting is a destructive phenomenon that occurs in some firearms (usually revolvers) as a result of hot gases under high pressure.

The most common manifestation is on the underside of a revolver top strap, where the hot, high-velocity gases released when a round is fired begin to cut through just above and in front of the cylinder. In most cases, this is self-limiting; eventually, the depth of the cut will place the undamaged material far enough away that the heat and pressure of the gas will have dissipated to harmless levels. This limiting tends to occur before structural integrity is compromised.
