= Collier (surname) =

Collier is an English surname, derived from the word "coal".

== People with the surname include ==
- Ada Langworthy Collier (1843–1919), pen name, "Anna L. Cunningham", American writer
- Aliyah Collier (born 1997), American basketball player
- Anne Collier (born 1970), American visual artist
- Arthur Collier (1680–1732), English philosopher
- Austin Collier (1914–1991), English professional footballer
- Barron Collier (1873–1939), American advertising entrepreneur
- Barry Collier (basketball), athletic director, Butler University
- Barry Collier (politician), New South Wales politician
- Basil Collier, military historian
- Bernard Collier (1802–1890), English-born Mauritius Roman Catholic prelate
- Bill Collier (1921–2015), Australian rugby league footballer
- Bobby Collier (1929–2000), American football player
- Brandon Collier (born 1985), American football player
- Calvin J. Collier (1942–2020), FTC chair
- Celester Collier, American basketball coach
- Charles Collier (disambiguation), multiple people
- Chris Collier (born 2000), American football player
- Christopher Collier (cricketer) (1888–1916), English cricketer
- Christopher Collier (historian) (1930–2020), American historian and author
- Constance Collier (1878–1955), British-born American film actress
- David Collier (sports administrator) (1955–2026), CEO, England and Wales Cricket Board
- David Collier (cartoonist) (born 1963), Canadian alternative cartoonist
- David Collier (political scientist), qualitative methodology and Latin American politics
- David Charles Collier "D. C." Collier, San Diego real estate developer
- Don Collier (1928–2021), American actor
- Earl Collier, American politician
- Edward Collier (pirate), 17th century
- Edwin Collier (1827–1899), English accountant, deacon and activist
- Elisha Collier, inventor of the flintlock revolver
- Elliot Collier, (soccer) footballer for Chicago Fire and New Zealand
- Evert Collier (c. 1640–1708), Dutch painter
- Francis Augustus Collier (1783–1849), Royal Navy rear-admiral
- Frank Collier, former British rugby league footballer
- George Collier (1738–1795), Royal Navy vice-admiral
- Sir George Collier, 1st Baronet (1774–1824), Royal Navy officer
- Gerard Collier, 5th Baron Monkswell (1947–2020), British politician
- Giles Collier, (1622–1678), English divine
- Harry Collier (1907–1994), Australian rules footballer in the Victorian Football League
- Henry Herbert Collier (1859–1925), British motorcycle pioneer
- Henry W. Collier (1801–1855), Governor of Alabama (1849–1853)
- Ian Collier (d. 2008), British actor
- Isaiah Collier (born 2004), American basketball player
- Isaiah Collier (musician) (born 1998), American jazz musician
- Jacob Collier (born 1994), British arranger-musician-singer
- James Collier (politician) (1872–1933), American politician from Mississippi
- James Lincoln Collier (born 1928), journalist and writer
- James Stansfield Collier (1870–1935), English physician and neurologist
- Jan Petter Collier (born 1950), Norwegian stockbroker and investor
- Jason Collier (1977–2005), NBA basketball player
- Jenny Collier, British marine geophysicist
- Jeremy Collier (1650–1726), English theatre critic
- John Collier (Pre-Raphaelite painter) (1850–1934), artist
- John Collier (fiction writer) (1901–1980), British author and screenplay writer
- John Collier (sociologist) (1884–1968), American sociologist, head of the Bureau of Indian Affairs
- John Payne Collier (1789–1883), British Shakespearean critic and forger
- Jonathan Collier, American television writer
- Kenn Collier, American politician
- L. J. Collier (born 1995), American football player
- Laurence Collier (1890–1976), British ambassador to Norway (1939–1950)
- Lois Collier (1919–1999), American film actress
- Lou Collier (born 1970), American baseball player
- Margaret Isabella Collier later Countess Margaret Collier Galletti di Cadilhac (1846–1928), Anglo Italian writer
- Margaret Wootten Collier (1869–1947), American author
- Marie Collier (1927–1971), Australian operatic soprano
- Mark H. Collier, former president of Baldwin-Wallace College
- Marsha Collier, American author and radio personality
- Mary Collier (1688–1762), English poet
- Michael Collier (disambiguation), several people

- Michael Collier (photographer), American photographer
- Michael Collier (poet) (born 1953), American poet, teacher and editor
- Michael Collier (swimmer) (born 1971), Sierra Leonean swimmer
- Mike Collier (American football) (1953–2025), American football player

- Mitty Collier (born 1941), American gospel and R&B singer
- Napheesa Collier (born 1996), American basketball player
- Norman Collier (1925–2013), British comedian
- Patience Collier (1910–1987), British actress
- Paul Collier, British author and Professor of Economics at Oxford
- Paul Collier (activist) (1964–2010), Australian disability activist
- Paul Collier (snooker referee) (born 1970), from Wales
- Peter Collier (politician), Australian politician
- Peter Collier (political author) (1939–2019), American writer
- Peter Fenelon Collier (1849–1909), Irish publisher, father of Robert Joseph Collier
- Philip Collier (1873–1978), former Premier of Western Australia
- R. John Collier (born 1938), American microbiologist and biochemist
- Robert Collier (author) (1885–1950), American author of self-help, and New Thought metaphysical books
- Robert Joseph Collier (1876–1918), American publisher, son of Peter Fenelon Collier
- Robert Porrett Collier, 1st Baron Monkswell (1817–1886), English judge and politician
- Ron Collier (1930–2003), Canadian jazz trombonist
- Shaun Collier, Canadian politician
- Sophia Collier, founder of the American Natural Beverage Corp
- Tim Collier (born 1954), NFL footballer
- Thomas Collier (disambiguation), several people

- Thomas Collier (painter) (1840–1891), English landscape painter.
- Thomas Collier (Unitarian) (c. 1615–c. 1691), English preacher
- Tom Collier (musician), percussionist and vibraphonist
- Tom Collier (footballer) (born 1989), Australian rules football player

- Vanessa Collier, American saxophonist, singer and songwriter
- William Collier (disambiguation), various people, including

- William Collier Jr. (1902–1987), American actor
- William Collier Sr. (1864–1944), American writer, director and actor
- William Collier (colonist) (c. 1585–1671), English settler in Massachusetts
- William Collier (MP), MP for Truro, 1713–15, and manager of the Drury Lane Theatre
- William Collier (footballer) (1892–1954), Scottish footballer, played for Scotland in 1922
- William Miller Collier (1867–1956), American diplomat
