= Collier's Flintlock Revolver =

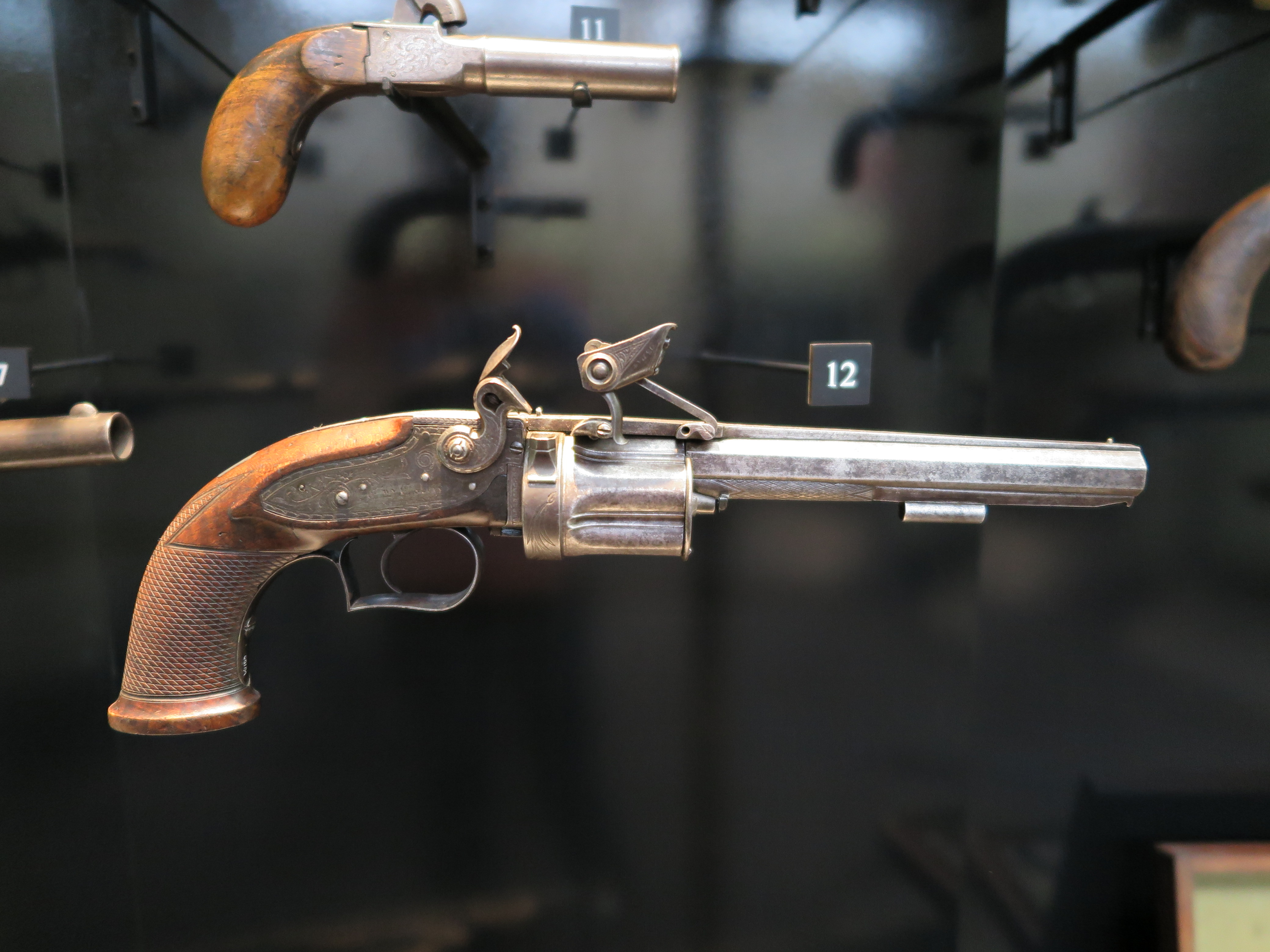
- Type: Revolver
- Place of origin: United States/United Kingdom

Service history
- Used by: Presidency armies

Production history
- Designer: Elisha Collier
- Designed: 1818
- Manufacturer: John Evans & Son of London
- Produced: 1819-1824
- No. built: 225

Specifications
- Caliber: .47 inch
- Action: Flintlock
- Feed system: 5 or 7-round cylinder

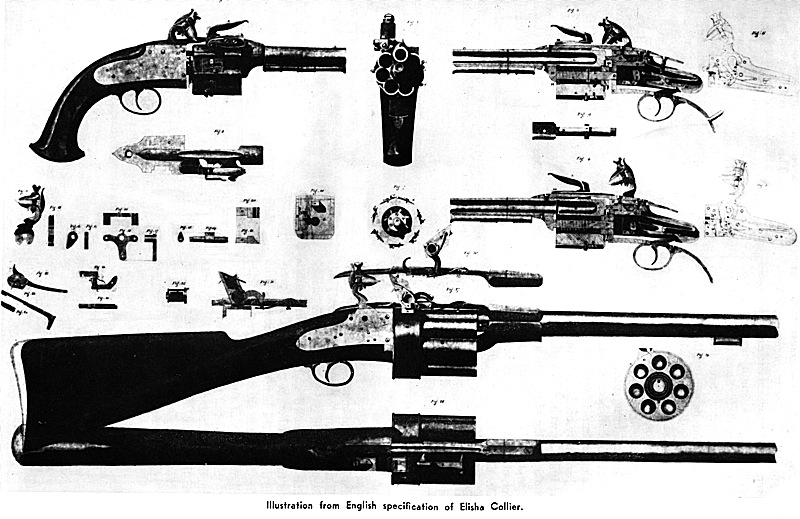
Collier's revolving flintlock pistols and carbines

Collier's Flintlock Revolver was a flintlock revolver that was invented by Boston-born gunsmith Elisha Haydon Collier and manufactured by John Evans & Son of London. Collier's Flintlock Revolver was not self rotating but it was self-priming: a compartment automatically released gunpowder into the pan when the hammer was cocked.

== History ==
Elisha Collier of Boston, Massachusetts, invented a flintlock revolver in 1818 in cooperation with his associates Cornelius Coolidge and Artemus Wheeler. His weapon was one of the earliest true revolvers, in contrast to the earlier pepperboxes which were multi-barreled guns. It was patented in 1818, produced from 1819 by John Evans & Son of London, and purchased by European officers in the presidency armies. Over 10,000 of value (approximately 160 long guns) in pound sterling was supposedly to be made and contracted for India according to Elisha H. Collier's testimony in the 1851 Colt vs. Massachusetts Arms Company patent infringement trial of 1851 (J. Harrison – The Gun Collector Number 35 Feb 1951, pp. 553–555.) but further on in testimony was diminished by Mr. Collier suggesting that this number was only anticipated. It is known that approximately 225 Collier pistols and long guns were made between 1819 and 1824, according to known serial numbers between the three types. A single barrel allowed greater accuracy and a faster reload time while reducing unnecessary weight. However, its flintlock action was a serious drawback: flints were unreliable and had to be changed frequently, while inferior quality powder risked a misfire.

Samuel Colt saw weapons of this type while serving as a cabin boy aboard the brig Corvo in 1832. Following his return from the Far East he was inspired to create his own caplock revolver: the Colt Paterson, which eventually supplanted the Collier Flintlock Revolver.
