= IEH =

IEH may refer to:

- Institute of Experimental History, a fictional organization in the Noon Universe fictional setting
- IEH, a signature used by Johan Engholm
- International Environment House, base of the Geneva Environment Network Secretariat
- International Extreme Ultraviolet Hitchhiker payloads carried in the payload bay of STS-69 and later space shuttle missions
- Common prefix for system utility programs in IEFBR14
- Institute of Electric Energy Systems and High-Voltage Technology at the Karlsruhe Institute of Technology
