= Michael Collier =

Michael Collier may refer to:

- Michael Collier (photographer), American photographer
- Michael Collier (poet) (born 1953), American poet, teacher and editor
- Michael Collier (swimmer) (born 1971), Sierra Leonean swimmer
- Mike Collier (American football) (1953–2025), American football player
- Mike Collier (producer), record producer
- Mike Collier, Democratic candidate for Texas Lieutenant Governor in 2018 and 2022
