= Marsha Collier =

American writer and radio personality

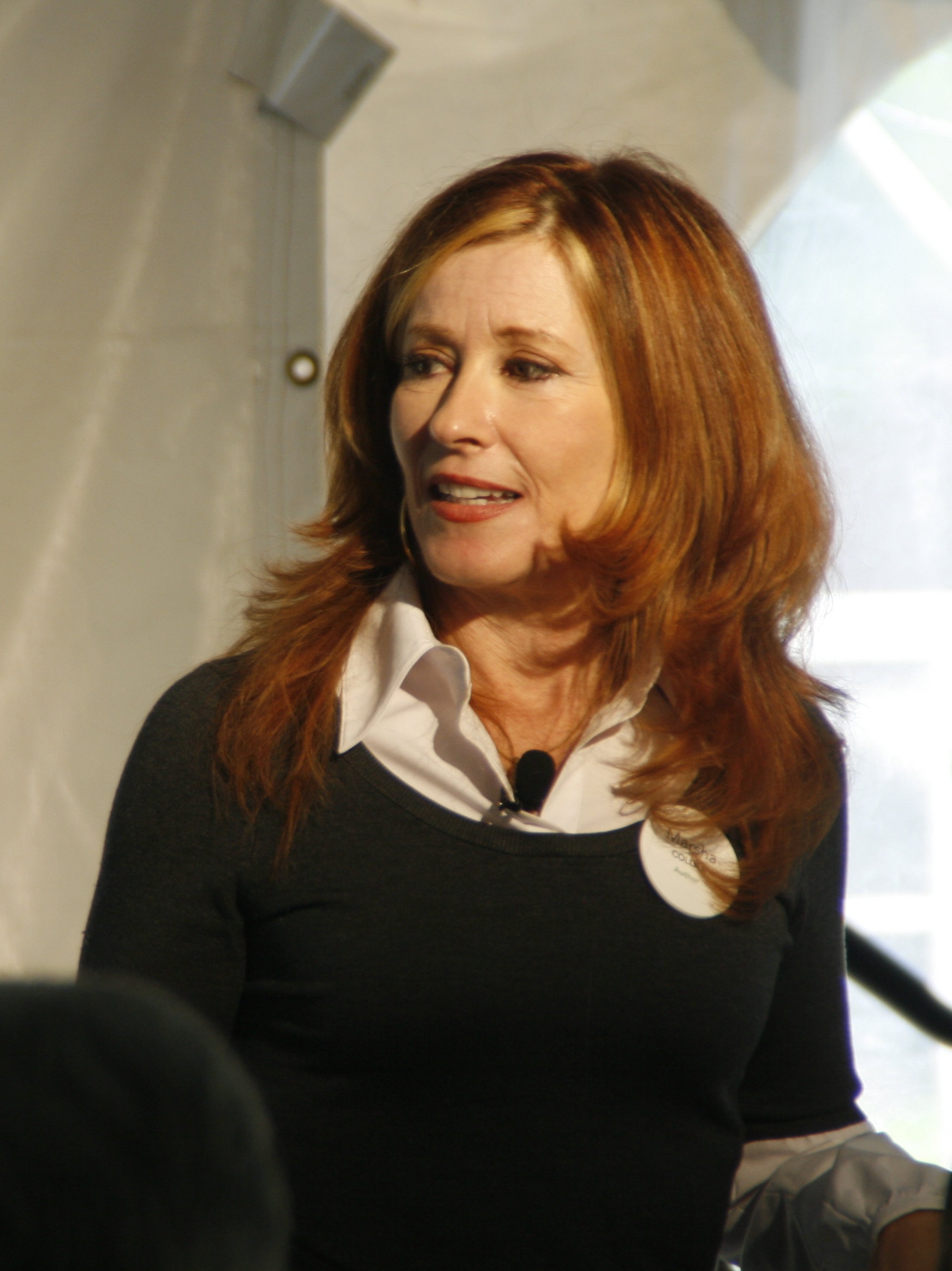
- Marsha Collier at iCitizen in March 2008
- Occupations: Author, columnist, radio host, podcaster
- Spouse: Curt Buthman
- Children: Susan Dickman

Marsha Collier (born in New York City) is a public relations and marketing expert working as a book author, columnist, radio personality, and podcaster specializing in technology, Internet marketing, Public relations, and E-commerce.

== Career ==
Before her online career began, Collier owned and operated her own marketing and advertising firm, The Collier Company, and won numerous awards, including “Small Businessperson of the Year” accolades from several organizations.

In 2003, her book Starting an eBay Business For Dummies appeared on the BusinessWeek list of best-selling paperback business books.

In December 2011, her book Ultimate Online Customer Service Guide: How to Connect with Your Customers to Sell More ranked #4 among "What Corporate America Is Reading." By 2013, her book eBay For Dummies was one of the best sellers on the topic.

As of 2016, with over 1 million copies of her books in print, she was the all-time best-selling eBay author.

As of April 2008, Marsha hosts the Computer and Technology Radio podcast with broadcaster Mark Cohen.

Adding to her experience as a podcaster, Marsha has joined Mo Kelly in May 2024 for Tech Thursday as a regular commentator on the Mo Kelly show at KFI AM 640, Los Angeles.

== eBay and eCommerce ==
Collier started her eBay career during the site's nascent years, becoming one of the site's first successful sellers. From there, Collier became an eBay Top Rated Seller., and later, decided to co-author the first edition of eBay For Dummies, which was published in 1999. Collier co-authored the first edition with Roland Woerner and Stephanie Becker, and became the sole author of the series, beginning with the second edition. The series is currently in its tenth edition.

In 2001, Collier expanded the eponymous series to reach individuals interested in making eBay their full-time profession, Starting an eBay Business For Dummies. The series is currently in its fourth edition. Soon after, Collier taught at eBay University as an instructor.

In 2003, her book Starting an eBay Business For Dummies appeared on the BusinessWeek list of best-selling paperback business books.

In December 2005, Collier hosted the Public Broadcasting Service (PBS) Public television program Making Your Fortune Online, a complete guide to starting and operating an online business. The two-hour program, shot in front of a live studio audience in San Francisco, was a full seminar on conceiving a business idea, finding products or services to sell, finding the best sites for your products, and understanding the legal, operational and tax issues related to having a successful online business.

In 2008, Collier was named one of 20 iCitizens in the book The Open Brand: When Push Comes to Pull in a Web-Made World by Kelly Mooney. That same year, she gave the luncheon keynote at the Online Market World conference in San Francisco.

In December 2011, her book Ultimate Online Customer Service Guide: How to Connect with Your Customers to Sell More ranked #4 among "What Corporate America Is Reading."

By 2013, her book eBay For Dummies was one of the best sellers on the topic. As of 2016, with over 1 million copies of her books in print, she was the all-time best-selling eBay author. She hosts the Computer and Technology Radio podcast with broadcaster Mark Cohen.

== Podcast ==
Collier co-hosts a podcast, Marsha Collier & Marc Cohen Techradio with former KABC journalist Marc Cohen, which they have run since 2008

== Accolades ==
She has also been named in online lists:

- ICMI's Top 50 Contact Center Thought Leaders on Twitter (2014, 2015, 2016, 2017, 2018)
- Brand Quarterly Magazine: 50 Marketing Leaders Over 50 2014, 2015
- Scott Goodson in Forbes: Must-Follow Marketing Minds On Twitter 2014
- Huffington Post: 100 Must Follow On Twitter 2014
- Social Marketing 2016: Top 100 Influencers and Brands
- Content Marketing 2017: Top 200 Global Influencers
- Top 100 Most Social Customer Services Pros on Twitter
- Thinkers 360 #1 Global Thought Leader and Influencer in Emerging Technology 2023

== Bibliography ==
=== Books ===
- eBay For Dummies 1999, 2000, 2002, 2004, 2006, 2009, 2012, 2014, 2016, 2020
- Twitter and Facebook For Seniors For Dummies 2010, 2014
- eBay Business All-in-One for Dummies 2006, 2007, 2009, 2013, 2018
- Facebook, Twitter & Instagram for Seniors (For Dummies) 2018
- Social Media Commerce For Dummies 2012
- Facebook fúr Senioren Fúr Dummies (Germany) 2012
- The Ultimate Online Customer Service Guide: How to Connect with your Customers to Sell More 2011 (Audible 2012)
- Facebook fúr Senioren Fúr Dummies (Germany) 2012
- AARP Facebook: Tech To Connect 2012
- eBay For Seniors For Dummies 2009
- Making Money on eBay For Dummies (Pocket Edition) 2009
- eBay PowerSeller Business Practices For Dummies 2008
- eBay Timesaving Techniques For Dummies 2004
- eBay Listings That Sell For Dummies 2006
- Starting an eBay Business For Dummies 2001, 2004, 2011
- Starting an E-Bay Business for Dummies (Playaway Audio) 2009
- PayPal For Dummies (forward) 2005
- eBay Bargain Shopping For Dummies 2003
- Santa Shops on eBay 2006
- eBay Para Dummies (Spanish) 2004
- eBay-Schnappchen Fur Dummies (German) 2004
- Mein eBay-Shop (German) 2005
- 开创你的eBay商务 玛莎•科莉尔，，，美国 (Chinese) 2007
- eBay Pour Les Nuls (French) 2006
- eBay Per Negati (Italian) 2008
- eBay For Dummies adapted for Australia 2006
- eBay For Canadians For Dummies 2006, 2008
- Starting an eBay Business For Canadians For Dummies 2006, 2008
- eBay.co.uk For Dummies 2006, 2008
- Starting a Business on eBay.co.uk for Dummies 2006, 2008
- eBay.co.uk Business All-in-One for Dummies 2009
- The Internet GigaBook For Dummies (Co-Author) 2004
- Android Smartphones for Seniors for Dummies 2021
