= Remington Zig-Zag Derringer =

Remington Model ZigZag Derringer
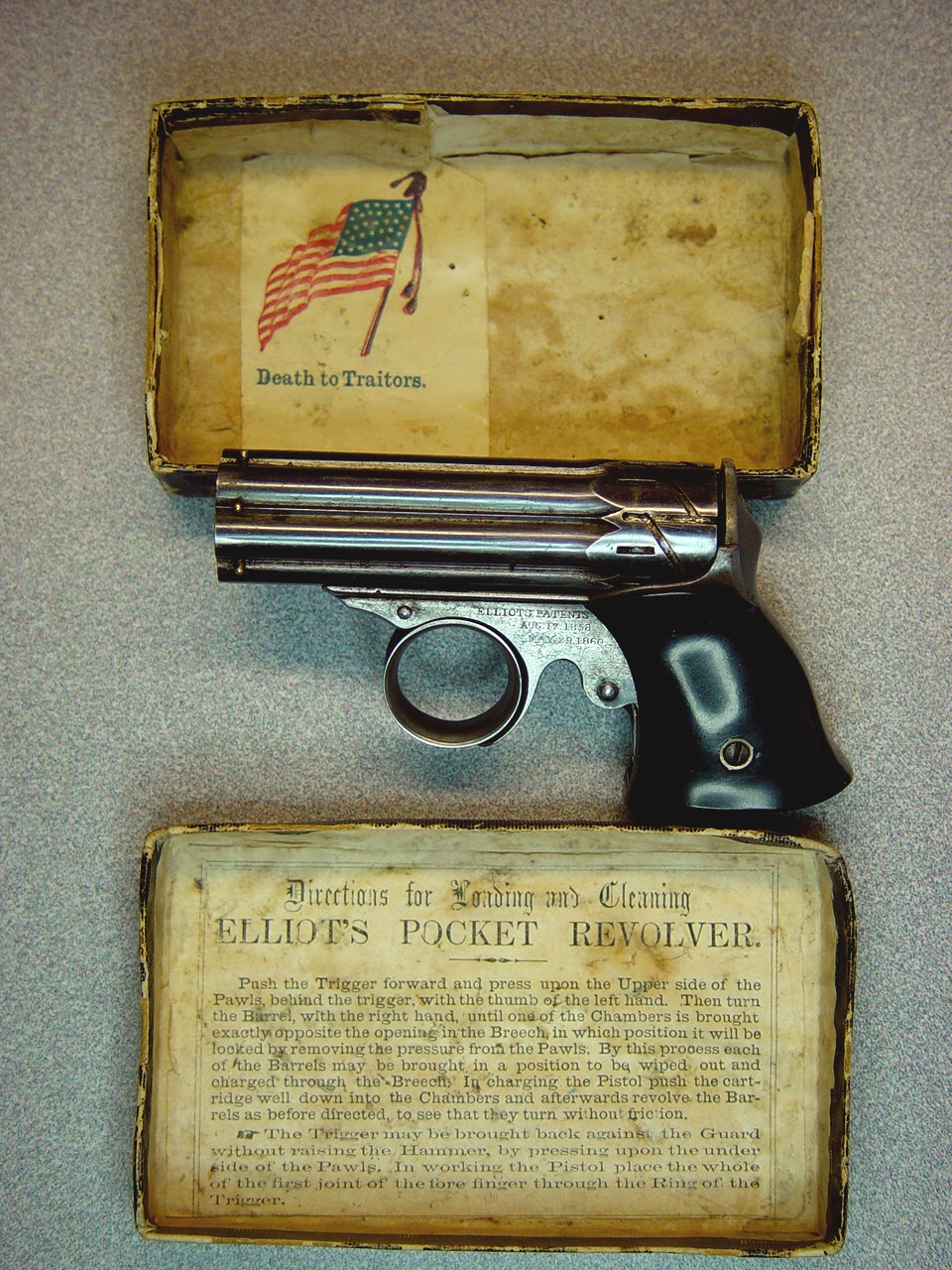
- Remington ZigZag in original box
- Type: Pistol
- Place of origin: United States

Production history
- Designer: Eliphalet Remington
- Designed: 1860
- Manufacturer: E. Remington and Sons
- Produced: 1861–1862, with evidence of long-lingering sales
- No. built: ~1,000
- Variants: Screws from left or right, rear spring adjustment screw

Specifications
- Cartridge: .22 Short
- Action: Double-action
- Feed system: Manual feed and ejection
- Sights: Open

The Remington Zig-Zag Derringer, or "Pepper Box", originally termed "Elliot's Pocket Revolver", was made 1861–1862 with fewer than 1,000 manufactured.

== Design ==
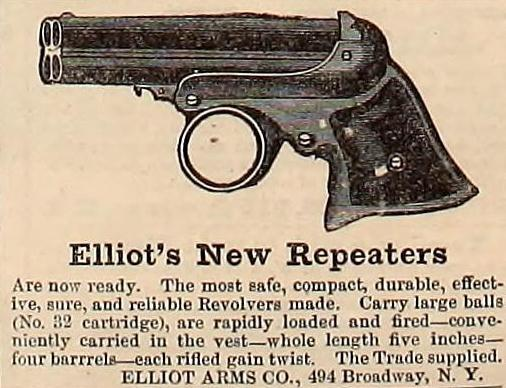
Elliot's new repeater, Harper's Weekly, (1864

A 6 shot 22 rimfire short, Remington's first firearm designed for metallic cartridge. Smith & Wesson patented the rim fire cartridge on August 8, 1854 patent number 11496. The patent was reissued in 1860. Six-Shot 3-3/16 barrel cluster with ZigZag grooves at the breech end working with diamond-shaped key extending in the interior from the ring trigger to provide the revolving mechanism of the barrels.

The Remington Zig-Zag Derringer is a double action derringer with a concealed hammer which is contained within the grip frame. The lever behind the ring is lifted to return the ring without firing and pushed down to release the barrel group to allow loading through a port in the breech of the frame. The grips are made of hard rubber (Gutta percha) and ivory being the only known other original. Blue or Silver finish (not nickel) or combination of both. Blue with silver frame or blue being most common and silver barrels more scarce. Screws can enter from either the left or right, mainspring set screw, none, or hole without threads present, throughout the serial number distribution with no apparent continuity. Serial number is on the frame under left grip.

Extensive study has identified approximately 140 known examples, being that this model has quite a delicate mechanism and was replaced by the Remington-Elliot Derringer "New Repeating Pistol" even before all were assembled, the survival rate of this model is expected to be quite low.

== Markings ==
- Elliots Patent August 17, 1858 - May 29, 1860 (left)
- Manufactured By Remington's Ilion, N.Y. (right).
