= Arthur Galletti =

British Indian civil service worker and translator (b. 1877, d. 1967)

Arthur Mario Agricola Collier Galletti di Cadilhac
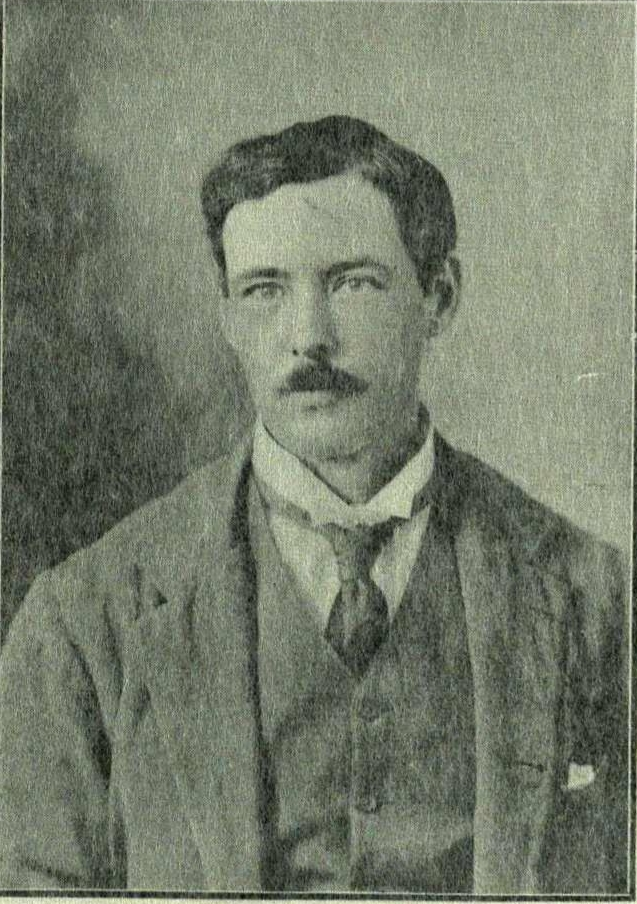
- Born: March 25, 1877; Torre San Patrizio, Italy
- Died: February 23, 1967 (aged 89)
- Notable work: British Indian civil service worker and translator

Arthur Mario Agricola Collier Galletti di Cadilhac or Arthur Galletti (25 March 1877 – 23 February 1967) was a British Indian civil servant of Italian origin who worked in the Madras Presidency. He translated several works from Telugu to English and also compiled a dictionary of Telugu.

== Career ==
Galletti was the son of Count Arturo Antonio and fairytale writer Margaret Isabella, daughter of English magistrate Robert Collier, 1st Baron Monkswell. He was educated at Trinity College, Oxford. While there, he was nicknamed "Gordouli" (after "Gordoulis", a popular brand of Egyptian cigarette) by undergraduates at Balliol, Trinity's neighbouring college, and as such was commemorated in the chant or song (known as a "Gordouli") which began to be sung in a spirit of intercollegiate rivalry over the dividing wall:

Gordouli
Face like a ham,
Bobby Johnson says so
And he should know.

Galletti joined the Indian Civil Service in 1900 working in the Godavari District as a collector and later as a magistrate and became an undersecretary to the Revenue Department in 1905. He served as a French translator to the government from 1909. In 1918 a refusal to drink to the health of King George V at a party held in Horsleykonda on 24 May (Empire Day) resulted in his being sidelined and a formal inquiry was held by a committee headed by Sir William Ayling.

Galletti published a book on The Dutch in Malabar in 1911. He retired from the civil service in 1934. As an expert on Telugu, he translated K. Viresalingam's Vinodha Taringini and compiled a dictionary of Telugu in 1935. He also wrote numerous government reports.

== Personal life ==
Galletti married Clara Salvadori-Paleotti in 1906. They had three daughters and two sons.

His brother, Roberto Clemens Galletti di Cadilhac, was a pioneer of radio transmission.

== Works ==
- Galletti, A.; van der Burg, A. J.; Groot, P., eds. (1911). The Dutch in Malabar: being a translation of selections nos. 1 and 2, with introduction and notes. Madras: Government Press.
- Galletti di Cadilhac, A. (1935). Galletti's Telugu Dictionary: a dictionary of current Telugu. London: Oxford University Press.
