= Roberto Galletti =

Italian radio telegraphy pioneer (1879–1932)

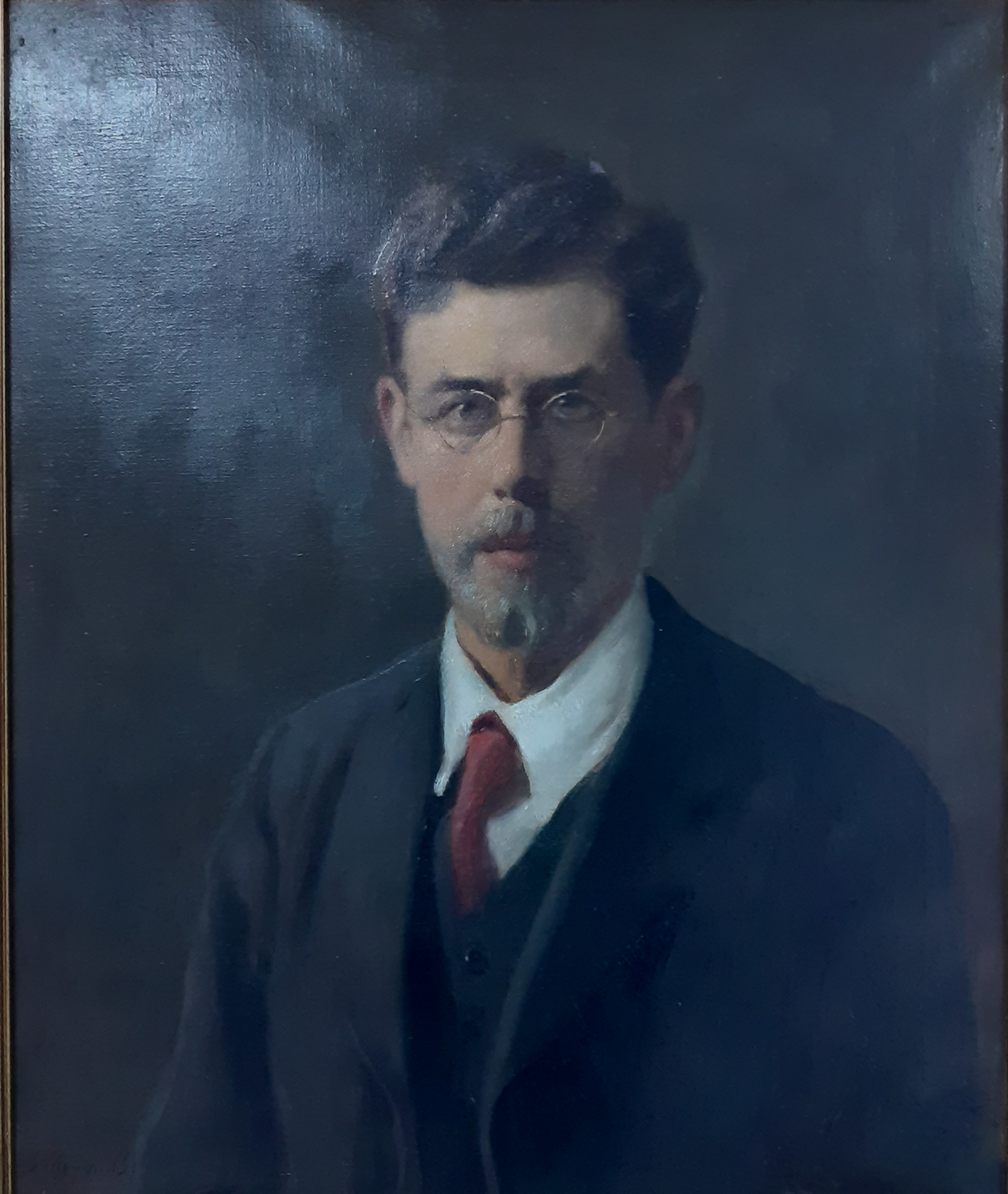
Portrait of Roberto Galletti by Sigismondo Meyer de Shauensee

Roberto Clemens Galletti di Cadilhac (29 December 1879 – 18 August 1932) was an Italian radio telegraphy pioneer. He worked at a time when Marconi was a dominant name and although he worked independently on innovations, most of them are largely forgotten.

== Early life ==
Galletti was born in Torre San Patrizio to Arturo (1843-1912) and his English wife Margaret née Collier (1846-1928). His brother Arthur Galletti became a civil servant in India. He studied engineering in Rome and began to conduct experiments. He became interested in wireless telegraphy and joined Marconi Company in London in 1902. Marconi's mother was English and was likely connected to the family of Galleti's mother. Galletti was sent to the Congo, and Marconi praised his work on the project. However, Galletti was dismissed after this, but in 1904 he met Marconi in person and they worked together again.

== Career ==
Galetti received a patent in 1906 for a method of producing undamped oscillations in a radiotelegraphic antenna. He then worked in Geneva in the Electric Industry Company, before moving to Lyon in 1909. There, he set up a radiotelegraphic transmitter in Villeurbanne, powered with 34000 volts and 2.5 amps with an arc created between carbon electrodes. The arc could be produced for a very brief period. The system was reviewed favorably by Quirino Majorana, director of the postal institute in 1911. René Thury congratulated him for the achievement and there was considerable interest in establishing trans-atlantic communications. Galleti was not able to work with the Italian government as Marconi had a full monopoly and in 1913 they shifted from spark transmitters to thermionic valves.

In 1912, he was assisted by English financiers to set up Galletti Wireless Company with a capital of £55000 and they negotiated with the French postal administration. The French decided that the village of Leschaux in the Haute Savoye was a good site for the transmitter. The transmitter had a "harp" antenna of ten copper cables 950 m long that radiated up the Rhône riverside cliff facing westward. It had a power of 350 kw and in 1914 it was able to transmit to Tuckerton, New Jersey. The receiving station had been built by a German and in September 1914 it was seized by the US military on suspicions that it was used for espionage. Germany had declared war on France, and the transmitting station was disbanded and the material moved to Bordeaux and by 1920 it was declared unusable. In 1924, Galletti began to work on narrow beam communications from ground to aircraft primarily to guide the pilot. He was able to demonstrate the system to Ferranti company in Manchester with a test of a signal set and received from De Havilland DH60 aircraft that flew to Lyon. He demonstrated it again in 1931 with a flight between Manchester and Bristol.

After World War I, little interest was shown in Galletti's ideas. He died in 1932 and the epitaph was provided by his uncle John Collier: "Clemens fought a losing battle with enormous courage, and he fought it for a very long time." In 1987, a museum on Galletti's telegraph was established in Saint-Maurice-de-Rotherens. A plaque now stands on top of the Rhône riverside cliff, where Galletti built his antenna in 1912.
