= Charles Collier =

Charles Collier may refer to:

- Charles A. Collier (1848–1900), American banker, lawyer, and mayor of Atlanta, Georgia
- Charles Fenton Collier (1828–1899), American lawyer and politician from Virginia
- Charlie Collier (1885–1954), English motorcycle racer
- Charlie Collier (rugby league) (1887–1962), Australian rugby league player
- Chuck Collier (1947–2011), American radio personality
