= Margaret Isabella Collier =

British writer (1846–1928)

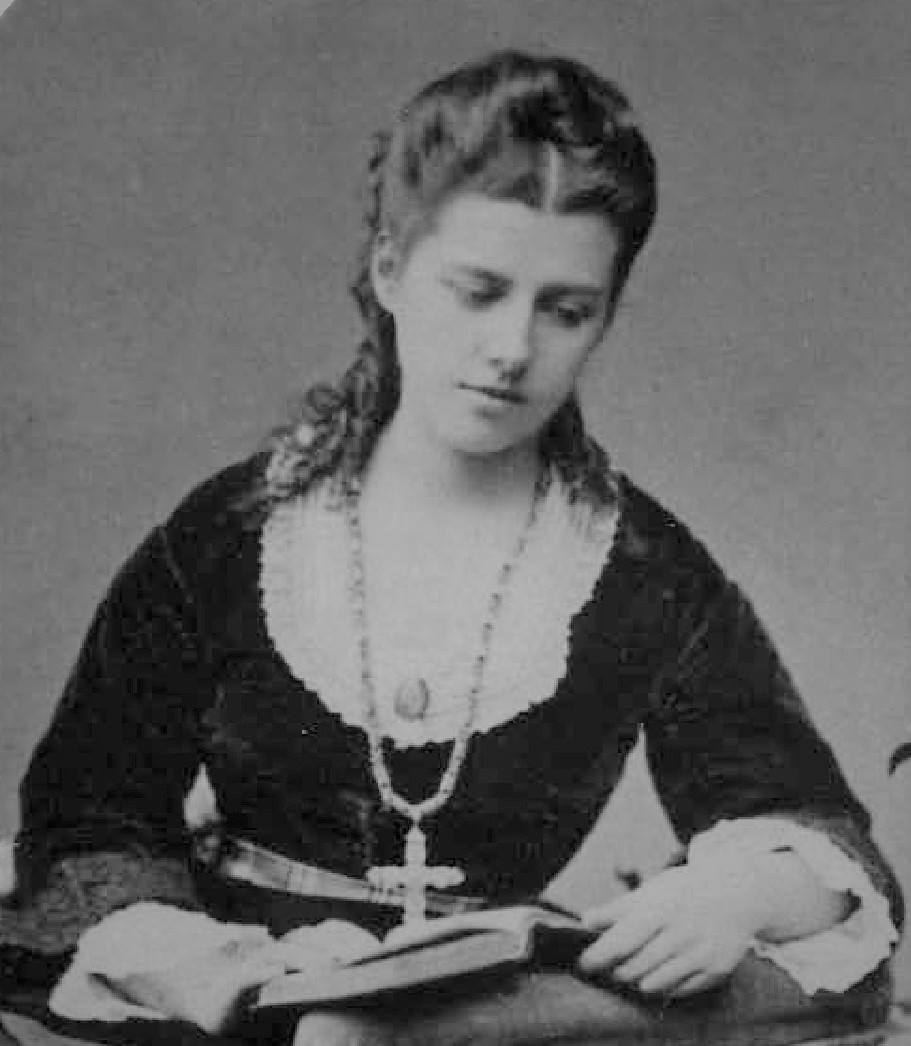

Margaret Isabella Collier later Countess Margaret Collier Galletti di Cadilhac (September 24, 1846 – June 27, 1928) was a writer of children's fairy tales and of travel. After marrying into an Italian noble family she wrote her best known book Prince Peerless which was illustrated by her brother John Collier (1850-1934). She also wrote about life in Italy in Our Home by the Adriatic (1886).

== Life and work ==
Collier was born in Plymouth, the daughter of Robert Porrett Collier, 1st Baron Monkswell and Isabella Collier. The family had sympathies with the Italian movement. As a young woman she was in love with a poet named Hubert who died and in order to distract her, she was sent by her parents to Italy. In Rome she met and married Conte Arturo Galletti di Cadilhac in 1873. Arturo Galletti, son of armyman Bartolomeo Galletti (1812-1877), had fought in the unification of Italy under Giuseppe Garibaldi (1807-1882) and had risen to a Lieutenant Colonel in the Italian Artillery. They lived in a small village in the Marche region called Torre San Patrizio. She described her home in a travel book Our Home by the Adriatic (1886). Her most famous work was Prince Peerless: A Fairy Folk Story Book (1886) a collection produced as an illustrated Christmas book. It was made for an English audience and included a number of stories of Italian origin and located there. She found herself isolated as an Anglican married to an atheist in a Catholic region. She separated from her husband in the 1900, living in other Italian cities and later settling in Plymouth, Devon. Her son Arthur Galetti became an Indian civil service officer while another son Roberto Clemens Galletti di Cadilhac (1879-1932) became a pioneer of telegraphy. Her daughter Giacinta Galletti Salvadori (1875-1960) also became a writer.

Collier's books included:

- The Camorristi, and Other Tales. London: Remington, 1882.
- Babel. 2 vol. Edinburgh: Blackwood, 1887.
- Prince Peerless: A Fairy Folk Story Book. London: T. Fisher Unwin, 1887.
- The School of Art. London: T. Fisher Unwin, 1891.
- Rachel and Maurice and Other Tales. London: Chapman and Hall, 1892.
- Some Annals of an Italian Village. London: Horace Cox, 1895.
- Our Home by the Adriatic. 1886.
