= Pepper-box =

Multi-barrel firearm

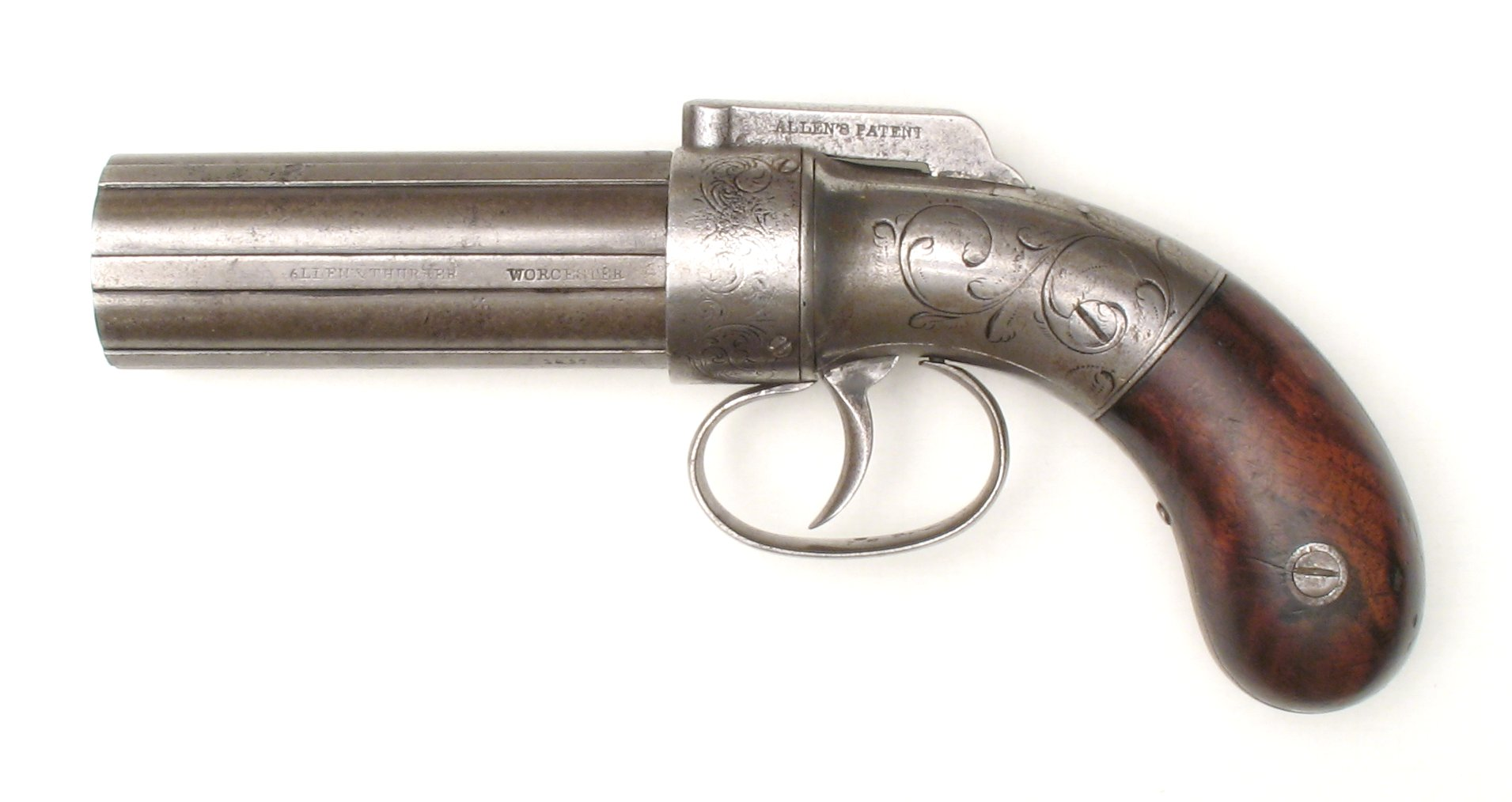
A pepperbox by Allen & Thurber, one of the most common American designs

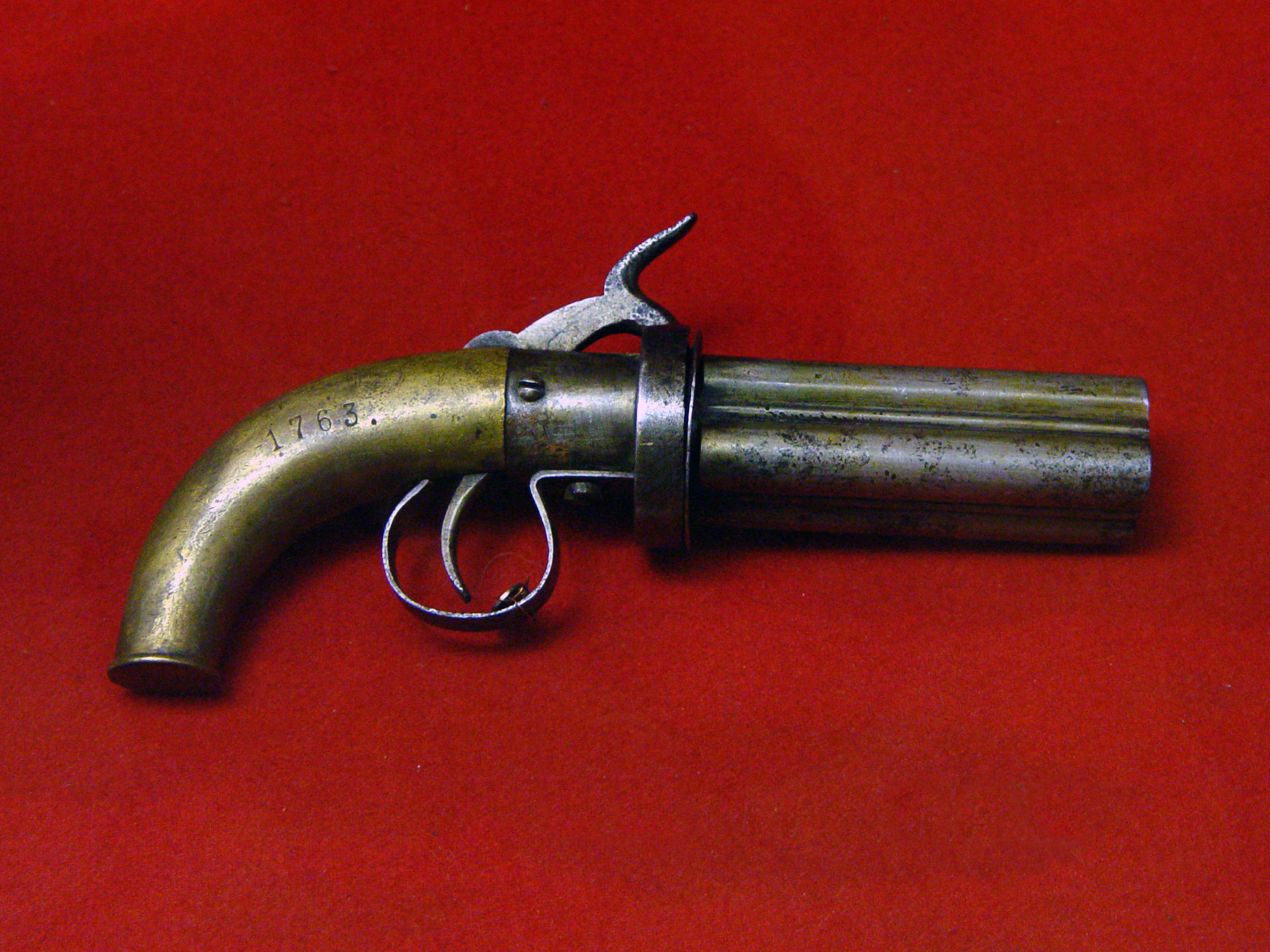
A mid-19th century four barrel Russian pepperbox pistol

The pepper-box pistol or simply pepperbox (also "pepper-pot", from its resemblance to the household pepper shakers) is a multiple-barrel firearm, mostly in the form of a handgun, that has three or more gun barrels each holding a single shot. The barrels are fired in sequence by a rotating firing mechanism or, more typically, by rotating the entire barrel assembly to bring each barrel in line with a single lock or hammer, similar to the rotation of a revolver's cylinder.

Pepperbox guns have existed for all types of firelock firearms and metal-cased ammunition systems used in breechloading firearms: matchlock, wheellock, flintlock, caplock, pinfire, rimfire, and centerfire. The weight of multiple barrels could make the weapon unwieldy and restricted most to the form of sidearms intended for self-defence, though a few long guns were also made. Popular in the mid-19th century, the design has occasionally been revived for specialty applications.

== Early years ==
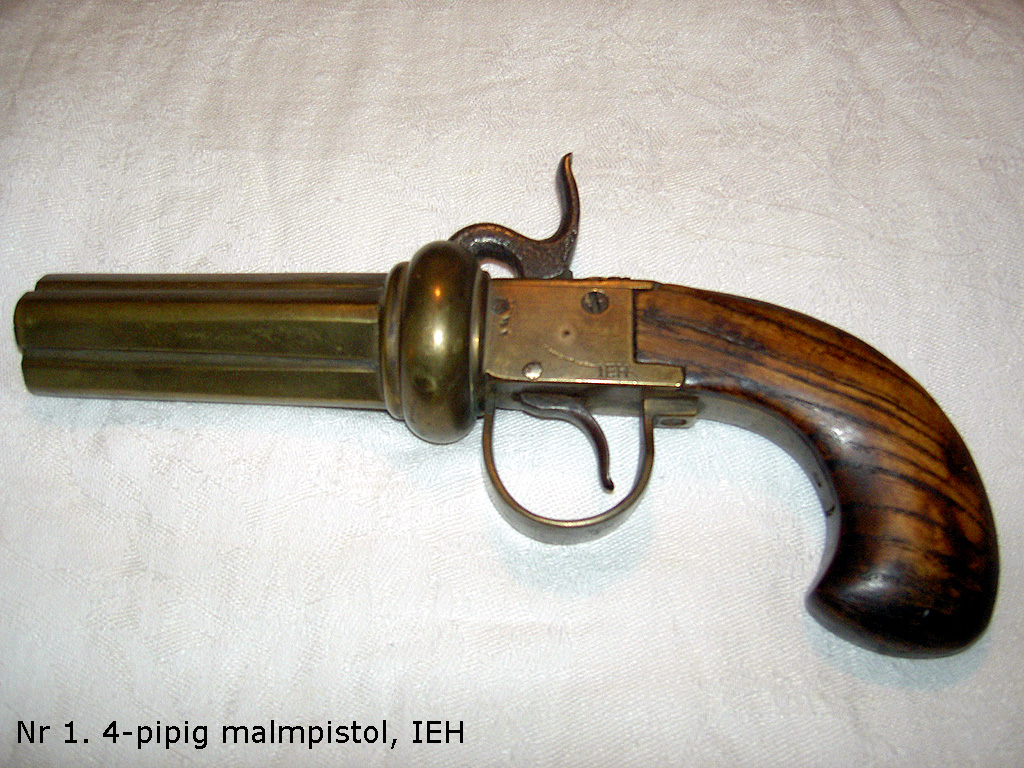
A pepperbox revolver from Småland, Sweden, made by Johan Engholm, Ödestugu

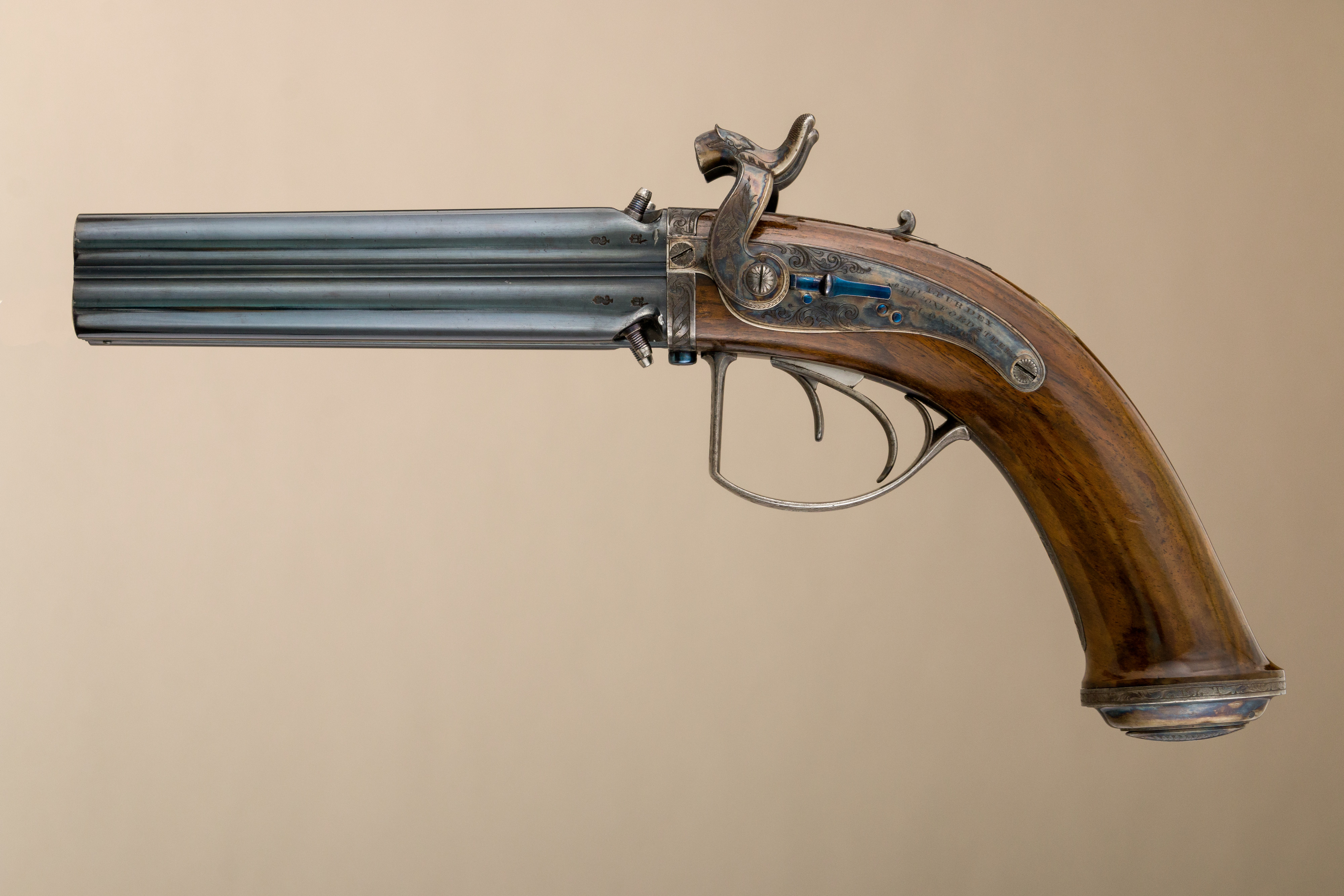
Four barrel hand rotated pepperbox made by James Purdey in the final years of the Regency era.

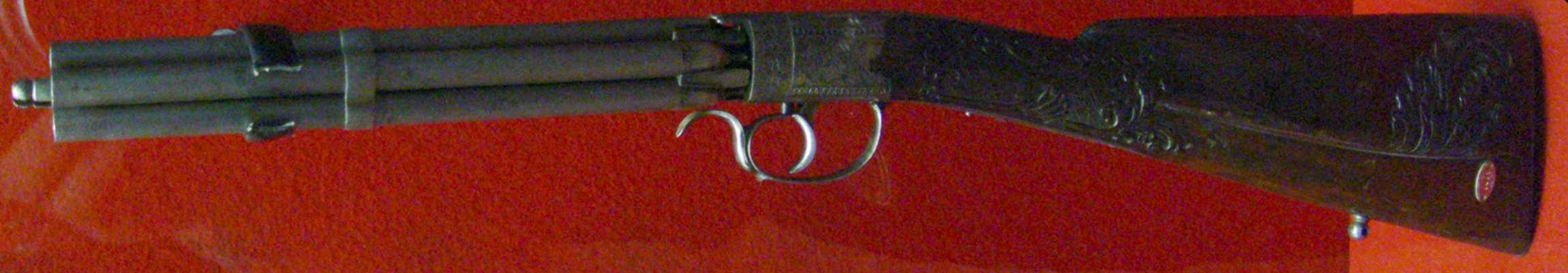
A Russian pepperbox carbine made at Tula Arsenal

This type of firearm was popular in North America from 1830 until the American Civil War, but the concept was introduced much earlier. In the 15th century, the ribauldequin, a version of the volley gun, had several single shot barrels attached to a stock, being fired individually by means of a match. Around 1790, pepperboxes were built on the basis of flintlock systems, notably by Nock in England and "Segallas" in Belgium. Building on the success of the earlier two-barrel turnover pistols, they were fitted with three, four or seven barrels. These early pepperboxes were hand rotated.

The invention of the percussion cap building on the percussion powder innovations of the Rev. Alexander Forsyth's patent of 1807 (which ran until 1821), and the industrial revolution allowed pepperbox revolvers to be mass-produced, making them more affordable than the early handmade guns previously only seen in the hands of the rich. Examples of these early weapons are the American three-barrel Manhattan pistol, the English Budding (probably the first English percussion pepperbox) and the Swedish Engholm. Most percussion pepperboxes have a circular flange around the rear of the cylinder to prevent the capped nipples being accidentally fired if the gun were to be knocked while in a pocket or dropped and to protect the eyes from cap fragments.

== Popularity ==
The pepperbox, or at least the firearm that is mostly associated with this term, was invented in the 1830s and was intended for civilian use, but military officers often made private purchases for their own use. The design spread rapidly in the United States, the United Kingdom and some parts of continental Europe. It was similar to the later revolver in that it contained bullets in separate chambers in a rotating cylinder. Unlike the revolver, however, each chamber had its own barrel, making a complex indexing system unnecessary (though pepperboxes with such a system do exist). Originally these pistols were muzzle loaders, but in 1837 the Belgian gunsmith Mariette invented a hammerless pepperbox with a ring trigger and turn off barrels that could be unscrewed. Samuel Colt owned a three-barrel pepperbox matchlock musket from British India.

A few percussion pepperboxes were still hand-rotated but most have a mechanism that rotates the barrel group as the hammer is cocked for each shot. Single-action versions were made, notably by Darling of Massachusetts, but the vast majority use the self-cocking system whereby pressing the trigger rotates the barrel block, cocks the hammer and finally fires the weapon. The main producer of self-cocking top hammer pepperboxes (mostly referred to as "bar-hammer pepperbox") in the United States was Ethan Allen, but this type of weapon was also produced in large quantities in England.

Some pepperboxes fired the lower barrel instead of the upper, such as the American Blunt & Syms, the English Cooper or the Belgian Mariette (with configurations between three and twenty-four barrels). Usually, these employed an "underhammer" action, with the hammer mounted under the frame, behind the barrels, and forward of the trigger (often a ring-trigger). Several other types of firing mechanisms exist, such as rotating internal firing pins (Rigby, Robbins and Lawrence, Comblain), rotating firing pins on a hammer (Sharps, Grunbaum) or multiple firing pins (Martin). During the early 1830s English gunsmith Joseph Manton offered a variant with a retractable knife blade, and pistols with up to 18 barrels. The Robbins & Lawrence pepperboxes of 1851–1854 had rifled barrels, a break action breechloading mechanism and an early safety catch, meaning that it was not necessary to disassemble the gun to reload it.

The flaw with the pepperbox design is that it becomes more front-heavy if the length and number of barrels are increased, making accurate aiming difficult. With most types, in particular, those with rotating barrel clusters, it is almost impossible to aim beyond close range because the hammer is in the line of sight (some pepperboxes have a slot in the hammer through which one is supposed to aim), there is no place to put a front sight (putting one for each barrel would only increase the weight of the front end and likely make drawing the weapon awkward), and the gun is too front heavy to permit quick and steady aiming. However, the primary market was for civilian self-defense, so its most common use was at close range. Common practice at the time, indeed, was not to aim pistols, but instead to "shoot from the hip", holding the gun low and simply pointing at the target's center of mass. Gunfights often happened at a very close range. With this use in mind, many pepperboxes, in fact, have smooth-bored barrels, even though rifling had been commonly used for decades by the time of their manufacture. In the Old West, large pepperboxes were favored by the gold prospectors of 1849, for protection against robbers, rival claimants and hostile native Americans. Both American and British made pepperboxes were also popular among gold miners in Australia as a cheaper alternative to the Colt Navy revolver, and several were used at the Eureka Stockade.

Multi-shot percussion firearms were often considered dangerous because firing one powder charge could ignite the others (a "chainfire"), all at the same time, when proper care was not taken. This problem was largely eliminated by the introduction of nipple partitions, evident on later percussion revolvers, which largely shielded the percussion caps on neighbouring chambers from the flash struck by the weapon's hammer during firing. However, this feature is rarely seen on pepperboxes, although some had the nipples placed in recesses or at right angles to each other to reduce the chance of a chainfire. A chainfire in a pepperbox would be far less dangerous than in a single-barreled revolver because, with a pepperbox, each of its bullets could freely exit its own dedicated barrel (essentially turning it into an impromptu volley gun). Similarly, if a chamber was not in exactly the right position when the hammer hit the cap it would fire normally and safely, as opposed to a single-barrelled revolver where a cylinder misaligned with the barrel when fired could cause a potentially explosive malfunction. This simplicity and safety helped the pepperbox survive after more modern revolvers came along, as well as keeping production costs a lot lower than revolvers with their more complex mechanisms.

== Transitional revolver ==
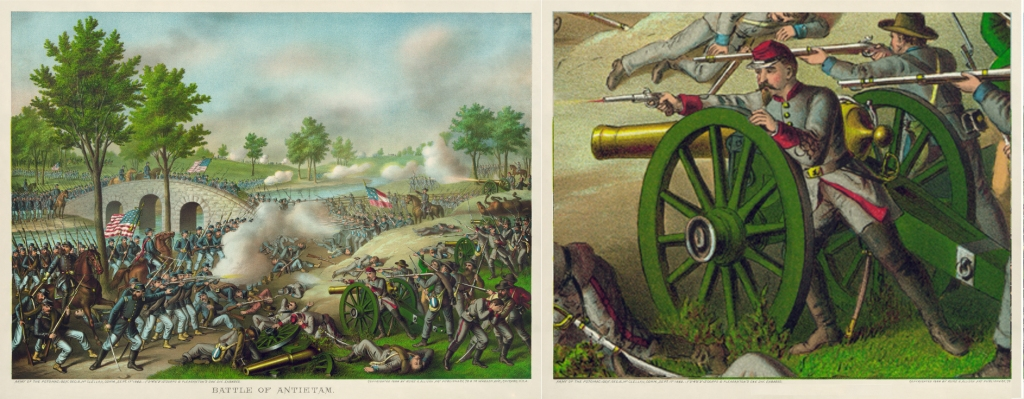
In this painting of an American Civil War battle the Confederate artillery officer is armed with a transitional revolver

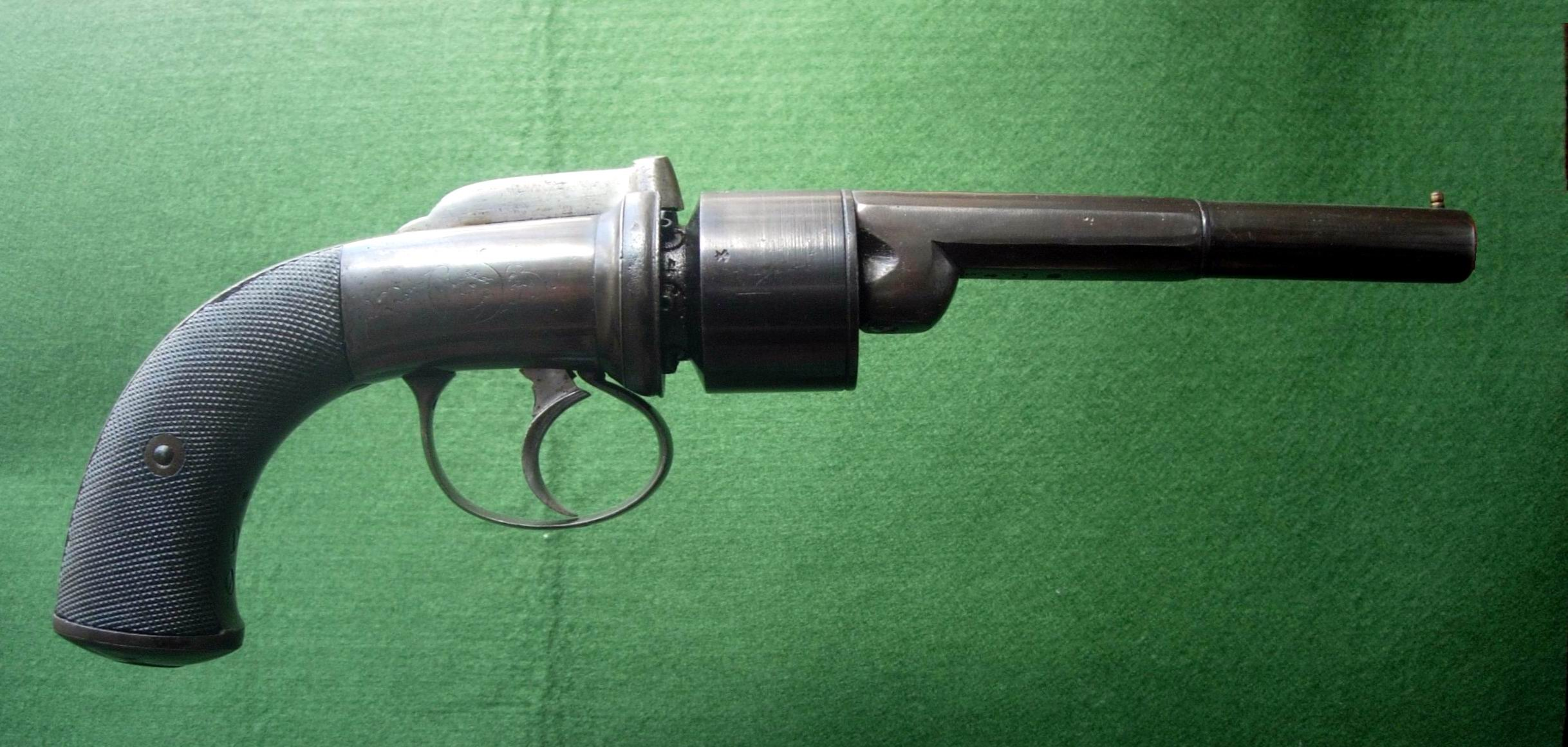
An English transitional revolver, mid-19th Century

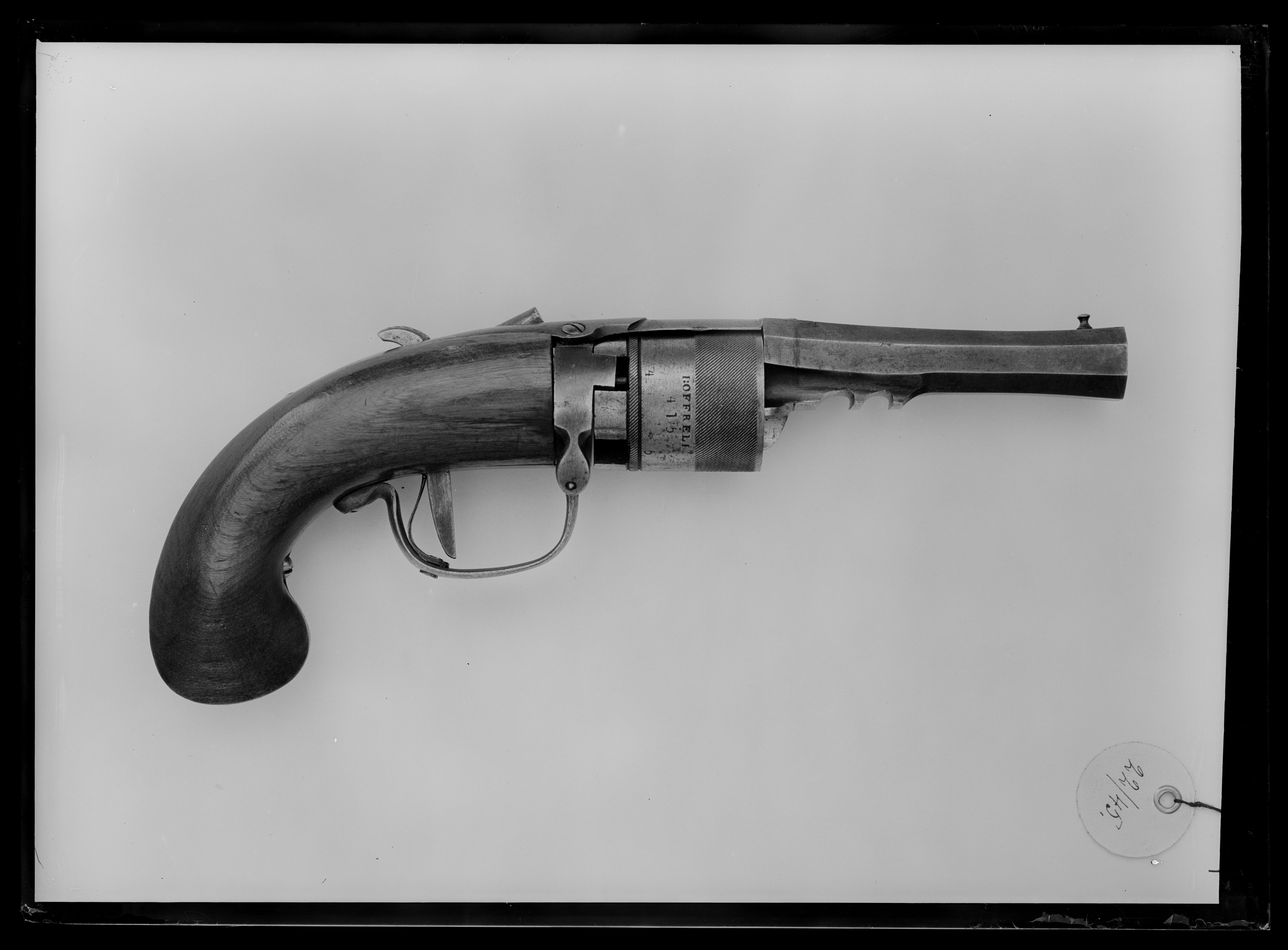
A Swedish transitional revolver converted to fire brass cartridges in the 1860s

A development from the pepperboxes are the so-called "transitional" revolvers. These weapons have a cut-down pepperbox cylinder firing through a single barrel. A transitional revolver is defined as a revolver (with barrel and cylinder) that does not have a cylinder stop, an early example being the 1739's revolver of Jaumandreu from Manresa and the 1702's revolver of Rovira from Ripoll, exhibited in the Armouries of the Tower of London, followed 100 years later by the Collier flintlock revolver of 1819.

It retained the pepperbox's caplock action but still had many deficiencies. The lack of an effective cylinder stop allowed a charge to be fired when the cylinder was not aligned with the barrel, resulting in an erratic shot possibly damaging the gun and even injuring the firer. While the shortened cylinder made loading easier, the barrel was attached to the cylinder pin, and over time this weakened the gun and decreased its accuracy. In addition, it lacked partitions between its nipples, risking chain-fires like the earlier pepperbox. This was exacerbated by the fact that the bar-hammers common on pepperboxes and transitional revolvers usually provided a weak blow, which meant that extra sensitive percussion caps were needed to ensure that the gun would fire, further increasing the risk of a chain-fire. Although later models were fitted with a shield to protect the user from cap fragments, there was still a risk of being killed or maimed as a multiple discharge could cause the gun to explode.

Since the bullets didn't have to be rammed down from the muzzle but were loaded into the cylinder behind the barrel, they could be slightly larger than the bore, which facilitated the use of rifled barrels. Whereas most pepperboxes are smooth-bore, most transitionals are rifled.

Daniel Leavitt was the subject of a lawsuit after producing a transitional revolver in 1851 with an identical loading lever to the Colt Dragoon revolver. Guns of this type saw use in the Mexican War as an alternative to the Colt Dragoon revolver and the Colt Walker revolver, most notably by General Winfield Scott. A late example the Butterfield revolver of 1855 used a Maynard tape primer rather than percussion caps. 640 were issued to the US Army during the American Civil War, but the government canceled any further purchases when the pistols were found to be inferior to the cheaper Colt Navy revolver. Transitional revolvers and pepperboxes started disappearing gradually in the 1850s with the manufacture of true revolvers by Colt, Smith & Wesson, Webley, Adams, Rupertus and others.

== Revival ==
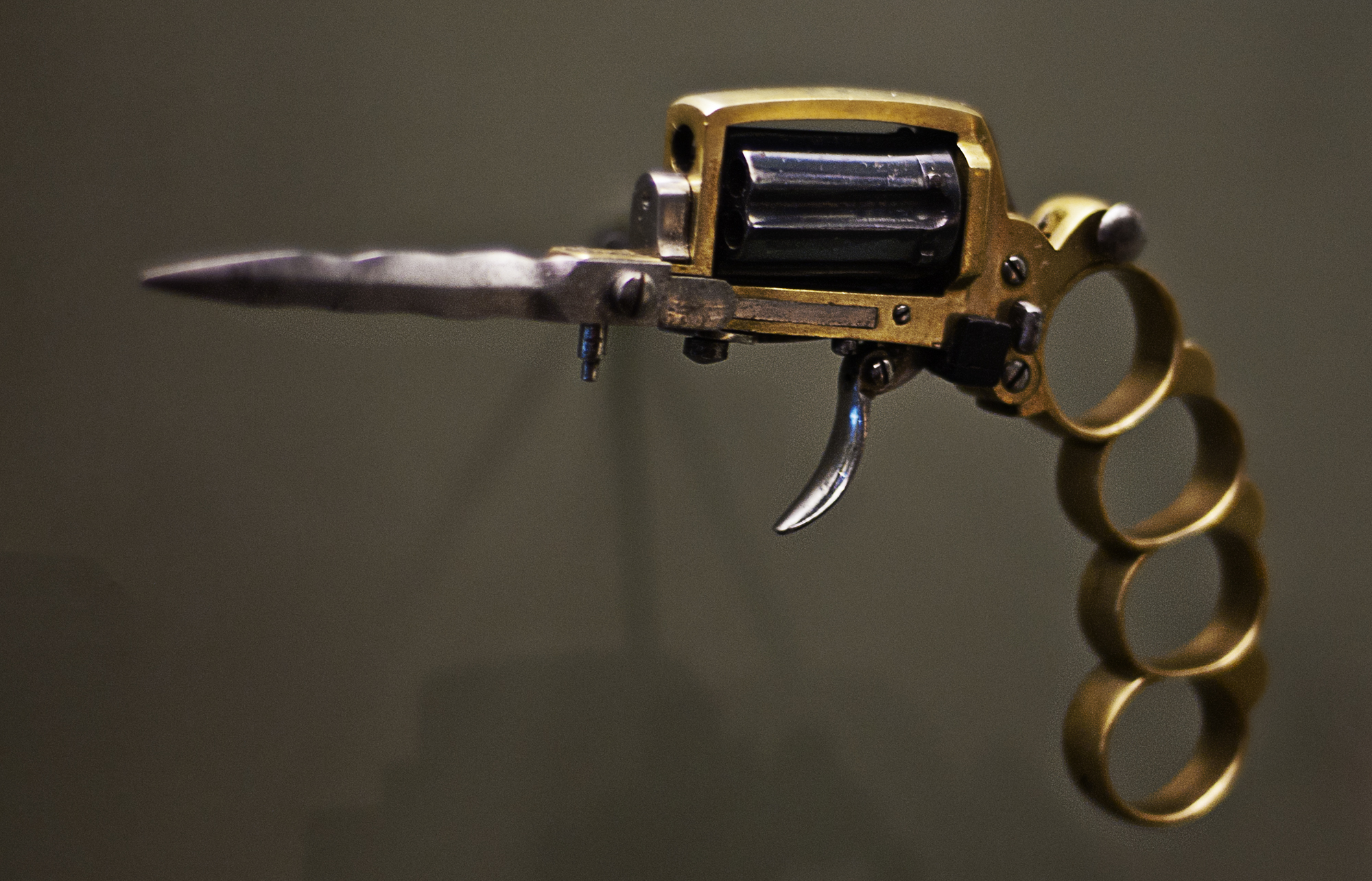
A Dolne M1869 Apache revolver, Curtius Museum, Liège

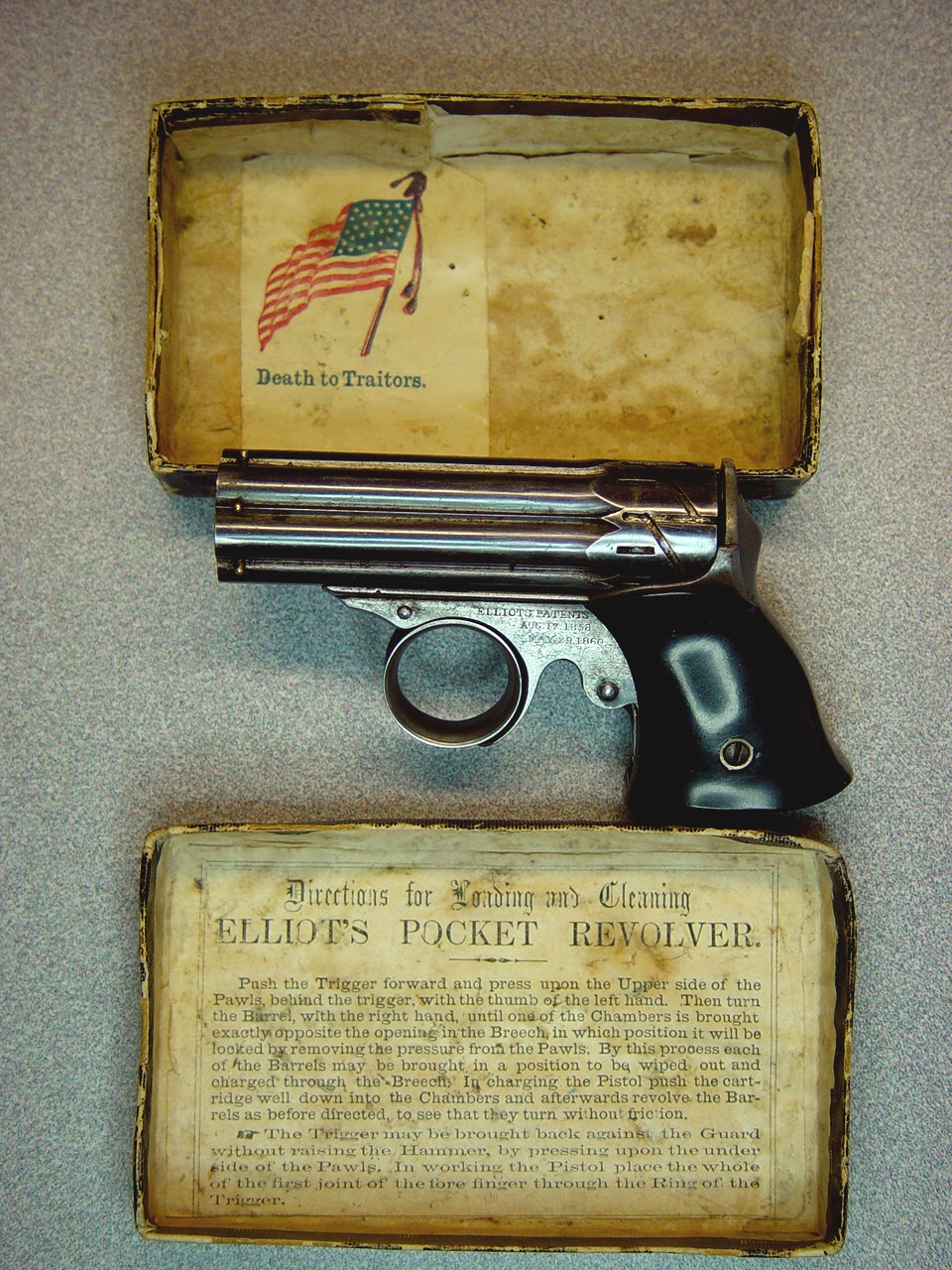
A Remington Zig-Zag, the precursor to the more famous Elliot pepperbox produced in the 1860s and 1870s.

The pepperbox experienced a kind of "revival" in the late 19th century as a short, easily concealable pocket pistol that used pinfire cartridges. The five-barrel 9.6mm caliber 1861 Feilitzenre pistol was almost accepted as the standard officer sidearm for the Swedish Army.

A special variation of this kind of sidearm, in which the shortness of the barrel cluster was fully used, is the Belgian Dolne M1869 Apache revolver. This weapon, allegedly popular among the Paris street gangs after whom it was named, was fitted with a folding blade and knuckle-duster. The Herman Brevete was used by cyclists for personal defense, and fired 6 rounds of 5mm pinfire cartrridges. The pepperboxes from this period disappeared with the demise of the pinfire cartridge.

One of the more interesting pepperbox revolvers is the .22 Short, six-barrel Remington Zig-Zag Derringer. Unlike the older single action designs, it had a double action ring trigger and could fire six shots as fast as one could pull the trigger. Guns of this type were prized by gamblers, in addition to the four-barrel Christian Sharps derringer, because they could be easily concealed in a vest pocket and easily used for self-defense.

== Modern use ==
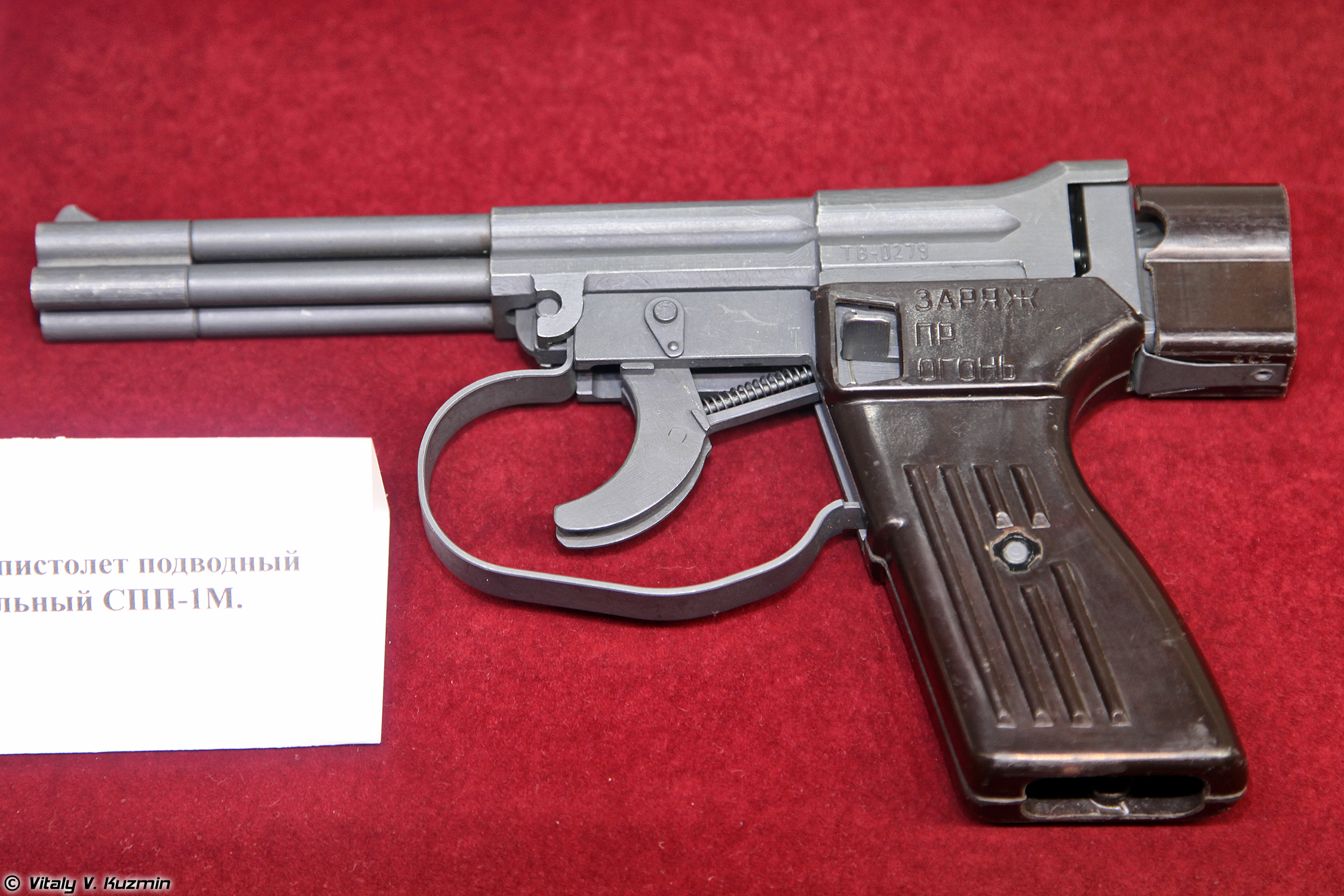
A Russian SPP-1 underwater pistol

The pepperbox design was used for a small number of weapon designs in the 20th century, most notably a six-barrelled derringer in .22 caliber from Cobray.

During the 1960s an eight-barrelled pepperbox shotgun, the Colt Defender Mark I, was designed by Robert Hillberg; but never went into production. The Gyrojet Pepperbox was a rocket firing shotgun that had almost no recoil.

In the 1970s Heckler & Koch produced the five-barrelled P11 pistol designed as a covert underwater firearm firing 7.62 X 36mm darts electrically.

The four-barreled COP .357 Derringer was manufactured from 1983 to 1989 by the later defunct COP Inc. of California, US (COP stood for Compact Off-Duty Police).

The KUGS HD410 is a .410 gauge pepperbox shotgun that fires by rotating the 18 barrels.

The Osa is a Russian four-barrelled pistol designed to fire a range of non-lethal and flare rounds from electrically-fired 18×45 mm cartridges.

The Reprringer is a design for a five-barrelled 3D printed pepperbox sidearm in .22 LR, which received widespread media coverage.

3D printed pistols resembling the pepperbox have been allegedly downloaded and manufactured by drug dealers in the UK. A student from London named Tendai Muswere was the first person convicted in 2019 of printing a multi-barrelled derringer of this type, known as the Hexen.

The Quest Firearms MC6 has a modular cylinder that uses "cylinder barrels" that can be removed and replaced with various caliber barrels ranging from pistol/carbine/PDW/shotgun/rifle cartridges.

== Popular culture ==
In the first season of Critical Role, and its animated adaptation The Legend of Vox Machina, the character Percival de Rolo III, played by Taliesin Jaffe, invented and wielded a pepperbox revolver.

== See also ==
- List of multiple-barrel firearms
- Gatling machine gun
- Ripley machine gun
- Derringer
- Lancaster pistol
