= Marc Cohen =

American radio personality

Marc Cohen is an American radio personality who has spent over 30 years as a Southern California radio host. Marc has been a judge for the Codie award judging the top software in the country.

Marc is host of the Distingused Speakers Series in Thousand Oaks Ca

Former President of the Starlight Children’s Foundations Los Angeles

Former Host of Computer and Technology Radio KABC Talk Radio Los Angeles
