= William Collier =

William Collier may refer to:

- William Collier Jr. (1902–1987), American actor
- William Collier Sr. (1864–1944), American writer, director and actor
- William Collier (colonist) (c. 1585–1671), English settler in Massachusetts
- William Collier (MP), MP for Truro, 1713–15, and manager of the Drury Lane Theatre
- William Collier (footballer) (1890–?), Scottish footballer, played for Scotland in 1922
- William Miller Collier (1867–1956), American diplomat

== See also ==
- William Collier Smithers (1795–1861), English author
- William Collyer (disambiguation), several people
