= Johan Engholm =

Swedish weaponsmith (1820–1918)

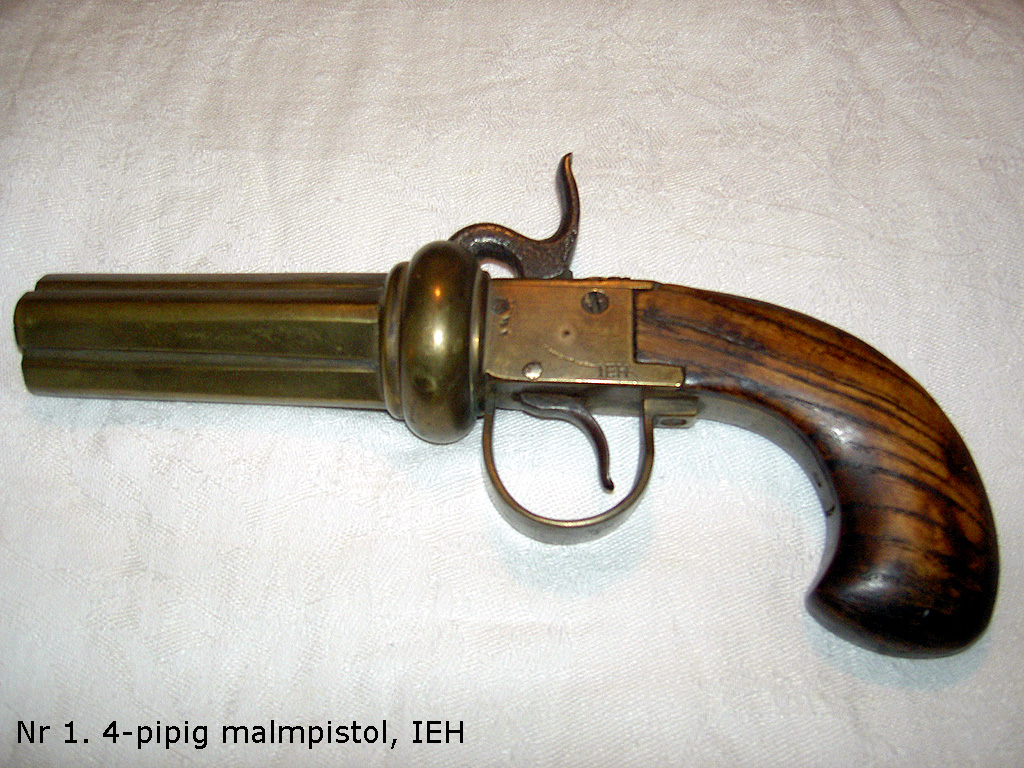
Pepper-box revolver from Småland, made by Engholm

Anders Johan Engholm (1 September 1820 – 25 October 1918) was a gunsmith from the county of Småland, Sweden.

Born in 1820 in Ånaryd, Ödestugu, Sweden, Johan Engholm began making weapons some time in the 1840s, particularly 1,2,3,4,6,7 and 8 barreled pepper-boxes and some revolvers. His signatures were J ENGh and IEH. He died in 1918 in Hestra, Ödestugu, Sweden. In collectors' circles, Johan Engholm's weapons, together with some other smiths' weapons from the same time and place, are called Smålänningar in Swedish.

Several descendants of Johan Engholm emigrated to the US (mainly Illinois) in the beginning of the 20th century.
