= Michael Collier (photographer) =

American photographer

Michael Collier is an American photographer. His work is often aerial photography of landscapes. He was featured in a recent NPR show and photo montage narrated by Howard Berkes called Sky Vision. Collier's photographs in the book The Mountains Know Arizona won the National Outdoor Book Award in 2004 for Design and Artistic Merit.

== Education ==
Michael Collier received his education from the following institutions:

- Northern Arizona University-BS in geology
- Stanford- MS in structural geology
- University of Arizona-MD

== Biography ==
Michael Collier used to have the job of rowing boats in the Grand Canyon. Collier currently practices medicine in Flagstaff, Arizona for his career. He also is a professor at the NAU School of Earth Sciences and Environmental Sustainability.

== Works ==
Michael Collier has created several books on the following:

- Colorado River basin
- Glaciers of Alaska
- Climate change in Alaska
- A three-book series on American mountains, rivers, and coastlines

As a special projects writer, Collier also was able to write and photograph books about the following:

- San Andreas Fault
- Downstream effects of dams
- Climate change

Collier has also created an app compatible for iPads that allow the user to view and learn about landscapes viewed from the air. He has also been a provider for a collection of stock photos.

== Awards ==
Michael Collier has received the awards that include:

- 1997-Shoemaker Communication Award
- 2000-National Park Service Director's Award
- 2005-American Geological Institute's Public Contribution to Geosciences Award
- 2007, 2008, 2009-Outstanding Science Trade Book award
- 2012-National Outdoor Book Award (Nature & Environment category)
