= Michael Collier (swimmer) =

Sierra Leonean swimmer

Personal information
- Born: 27 September 1971 (age 54)

Sport
- Sport: Swimming

Michael Collier (born 27 September 1971) is a Sierra Leonean swimmer. He competed in the men's 50 metre freestyle event at the 1996 Summer Olympics.
