= Elisha Collier =

American inventor

- Born: Elisha Haydon Collier; 1788; Boston, Massachusetts
- Died: January 23, 1856; Boston, Massachusetts
- Occupation: Firearms designer

Elisha Haydon Collier (1788–1856) of Boston, Massachusetts, invented a flintlock revolver around 1818. It is one of the earliest true revolvers, after the 1739's revolver of Iaumandreu from Manresa and 1702's of Rovira from Ripoll, exhibited in the Armouries of the Tower of London, in contrast to the earlier pepperboxes which were multi-barreled guns. Collier's revolver was not self rotating but it was self-priming: a compartment automatically released gunpowder into the pan when the hammer was cocked.

== Gunmaking ==
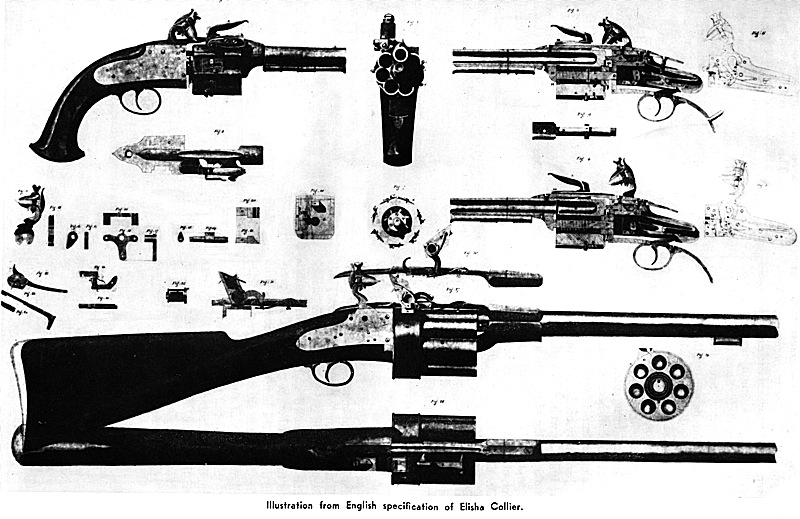
Collier's flintlock revolvers

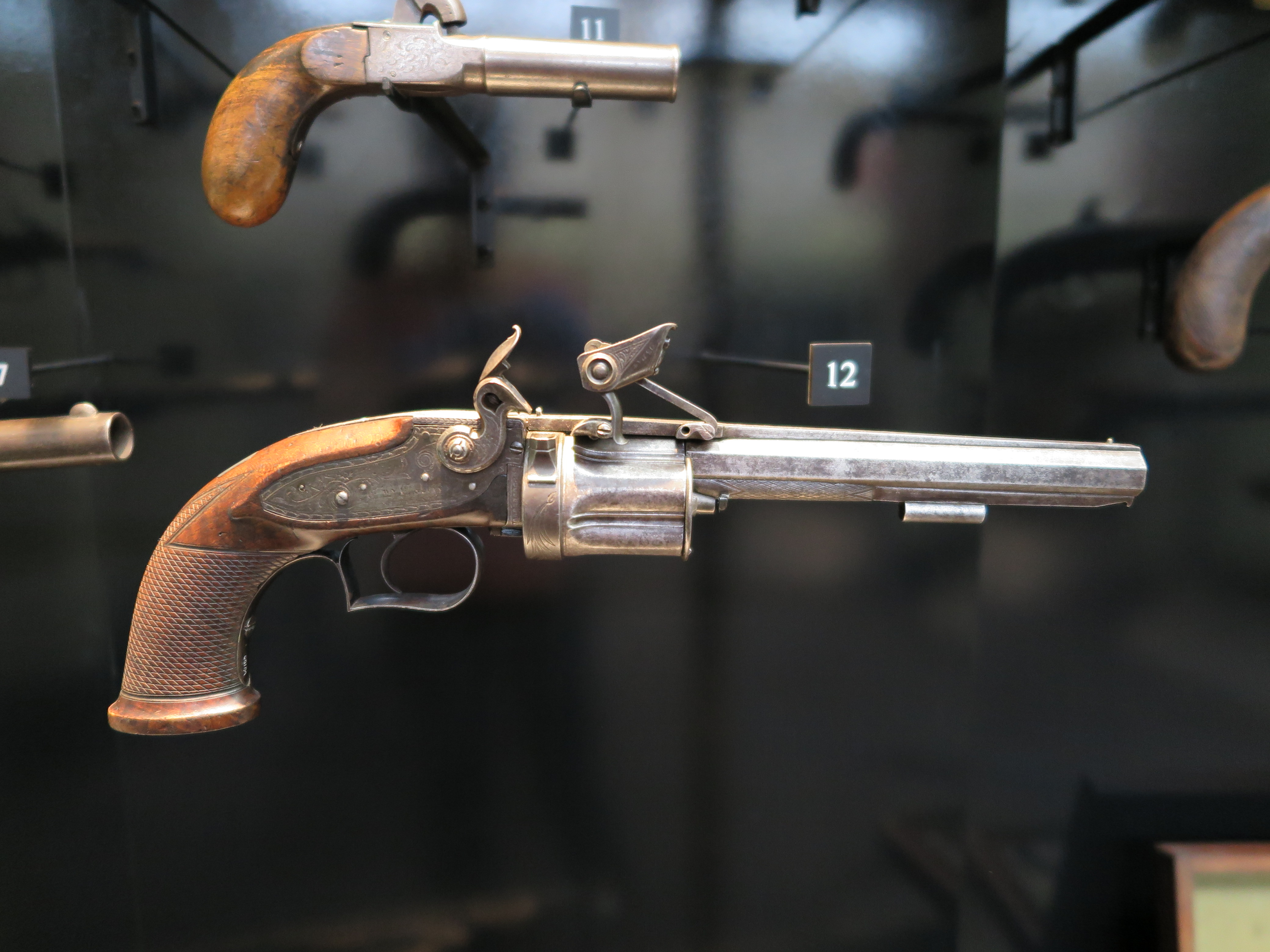
A surviving Collier's revolver

It was patented in 1818, produced from 1819 by John Evans & Son of London, and purchased by European officers in the presidency armies. Over 10,000 of value (approximately 160 long guns) in pound sterling was supposedly to be made and contracted for India according to Elisha H. Collier's testimony in the 1851 Colt vs. Massachusetts Arms Company patent infringement trial of 1851 (J. Harrison – The Gun Collector Number 35 Feb 1951, pp. 553–555.) but further on in testimony was diminished by Mr. Collier suggesting that this number was only anticipated. It is known that there are but approximately 225 Collier pistols and long guns were made between 1819 and 1824, according to known serial numbers between the three types. A single barrel allowed greater accuracy and a faster reload time while reducing unnecessary weight. However, its flintlock action was a serious drawback: flints were unreliable and had to be changed frequently, while inferior quality powder risked a misfire.

Samuel Colt saw weapons of this type while serving as a cabin boy aboard the brig Corvo in 1832. Following his return from the Far East he was inspired to create his own caplock revolver: the Colt Paterson.

Collier also produced revolving shotguns and carbines in the 1820s. Only 150 of these now rare guns were made.

== Other activities ==
In the 1830s, Collier invented a new boiler for steam ships. He wrote a book on the subject, which was published in 1836. In 1839 Collier designed a machine for mass-producing nails for the Globe Dock Factory, Rotherhithe, Surrey.

== Later life ==
Collier lived in England from 1818 until 1850, when he returned to Boston, Massachusetts. By this time Colt's cheaper mass-produced revolvers had supplanted his earlier, hand made designs. Collier is listed as having lived at 88 Eliot Street in an 1850 census, where he died on January 23, 1856.
