= List of shotguns =

Shotguns have traditionally fired iron, stone or lead shot stored in large shells that are normally loaded.

Name	Manufacturer	Image	Cartridge	Country	Year
AAI CAWS	AAI Corporation		12 gauge special 12 gauge	United States	1980s
Akdal MKA 1919	Akdal Arms (Ucyildiz Arms A.Ş.)		12 gauge	Turkey	2006
Ares Companion	Ares Defense		.410 bore	United States	2005
Armsel Striker	Hilton R. Walker		12 gauge	South Africa	1981
Atchisson Assault Shotgun	Military Police Systems		12 gauge	United States	1972
Baikal MP-153	Izhevsk Mechanical Plant		12 gauge	Russia	2001
Ball and shot gun	Holland & Holland		8 gauge 10 gauge 12 gauge 20 gauge 24 gauge	United Kingdom	1885
Bandayevsky RB-12	Aleksandrev Bandayevsky		12 gauge	Russia	1995
Becker Revolving Shotgun	Römerwerk AG		16 Gauge	Germany	1899
Benelli M1	Benelli Armi		12 gauge 20 gauge	Italy	1986
Benelli M2	Benelli Armi		12 gauge 20 gauge	Italy	1980s
Benelli M3	Benelli Armi		12 gauge 20 gauge	Italy	1989
Benelli M4	Benelli Armi		12 gauge	Italy	1999
Benelli Nova	Benelli Armi		12 gauge 20 gauge	Italy	1999
Benelli Raffaello	Benelli Armi		12 gauge	Italy	1990
Benelli Raffaello CrioComfort	Benelli Armi		12 gauge	Italy	2010
Benelli Supernova	Benelli Armi		12 gauge	Italy	2006
Benelli Vinci	Benelli Armi		12 gauge	Italy	2009
Beretta 682	Fabbrica d'Armi Pietro Beretta		12 gauge 20 gauge 28 gauge.410 bore	Italy	1984
Beretta 1200 FP	Fabbrica d'Armi Pietro Beretta		12 gauge	Italy	1980s
Beretta 1201FP	Fabbrica d'Armi Pietro Beretta		12 gauge	Italy	1980s
Beretta 1301	Fabbrica d'Armi Pietro Beretta		12 gauge	Italy	2014
Beretta A303	Fabbrica d'Armi Pietro Beretta		12 gauge	Italy	1987
Beretta AL390	Fabbrica d'Armi Pietro Beretta		12 gauge	Italy	1992
Beretta AL391	Fabbrica d'Armi Pietro Beretta		12 gauge 20 gauge	Italy	1999
Beretta DT-10	Fabbrica d'Armi Pietro Beretta		12 gauge	Italy	2000
Beretta Silver Pigeon	Fabbrica d'Armi Pietro Beretta		12 gauge 20 gauge 28 gauge.410 bore	Italy	1950s
Beretta Tx4 Storm	Fabbrica d'Armi Pietro Beretta		12 gauge	Italy	2010
Beretta Ultraleggero	Fabbrica d'Armi Pietro Beretta			Italy	2021
Beretta Xtrema 2	Fabbrica d'Armi Pietro Beretta		12 gauge	Italy	2004
Blaser F3	Blaser Jagdwaffen GmbH		12 gauge 20 gauge 28 gauge	Germany	2004
Blunderbuss				Dutch Republic	1600s
Brixia PM-5	Brixia Shotguns		12 gauge	Italy	1980s
Browning Auto-5	FN Herstal		12 gauge 16 gauge 20 gauge	United States; Belgium	1898
Browning BSS	Browning Arms Company		10 gauge 20 gauge	United States	1971
Browning BPS	Browning Arms Company		10 gauge 12 gauge 16 gauge 20 gauge 28 gauge.410 bore	Japan	1977
Browning Citori	Miroku Corporation		12 gauge 16 gauge 20 gauge 28 gauge.410 bore	Japan	1973
Browning Double Automatic Shotgun	Browning Arms Company; FN Herstal		12 gauge	United States; Belgium	1955
Browning Superposed	Browning Arms Company; FN Herstal		12 gauge 16 gauge 20 gauge	United States; Belgium	1922
Camp gun	Standard Arms		.50 caliber proprietary round	United States	1909
Chiappa Double Badger	Chiappa Firearms		.22 LR.410 bore.22 Winchester Magnum Rimfire; 20 gauge.243 Winchester	Italy	2013
Chiappa Little Badger	Chiappa Firearms		9mm Flobert	Italy	2013
Chiappa M6 survival gun	Chiappa Firearms		12 gauge.22 LR.22 Winchester Magnum Rimfire; 20 gauge	Italy	2010
Chiappa Triple Crown	Chiappa Firearms		12 gauge 20 gauge 28 gauge.410 bore	Italy; Turkey	2013
Ciener Ultimate Over/Under	Johnathan Arthur Ciener		12 gauge	United States	1989
Coach gun	Wells Fargo & Co.		10 gauge 12 gauge	United States	1858
Colt Defender Mark I	Colt's Manufacturing Company		20 gauge 3 inch magnum	United States	1967
Cooey 84	H. W. Cooey Machine & Arms Company		12 gauge 16 gauge 20 gauge 28 gauge.410 bore	Canada	1947
Crye Six12	Crye Precision		12 gauge	United States	2014
Cynergy Shotgun	Miroku Corporation			Japan; United States	2004
Daewoo Precision Industries USAS-12	Daewoo Precision Industries		12 gauge	South Korea; United States	1980s
ENARM Pentagun	ENARM		12 gauge	Brazil	1986
Fabarm SDASS Tactical	Fabbrica Bresciana Armi		12 gauge	Italy	2002
FN P-12	FN Herstal		12 gauge	Belgium	2012
FN SC-1	FN Herstal		12 gauge	Belgium	2011
FN SLP	FN Herstal		12 gauge	Belgium	2008
FN TPS	FN Herstal		12 gauge	Belgium	1995
Fosbery Pump Shotgun	George Vincent Fosbery		16 bore	United Kingdom	1891
Fort-500	RPC Fort		12 gauge	Ukraine	1990s
Fostech Origin 12	Fostech Outdoors		12 gauge	United States	2013
Franchi AL-48	Luigi Franchi S.p.A.		12 gauge 20 gauge 28 gauge	Italy	1948
Franchi SPAS-12	Luigi Franchi S.p.A.		12 gauge	Italy	1979
Franchi SPAS-15	Luigi Franchi S.p.A.		12 gauge	Italy	1986
GEN-12	Genesis Arms		12 gauge 20 gauge	United States	2024
Greener Police Gun	W.W. Greener		14 gauge Greener; 12 gauge	United Kingdom	1921
H&R Handy-Gun	H&R Firearms		.410 bore 28 gauge	United States	1921
H&R Ultraslug Hunter	H&R Firearms		12 gauge 20 gauge	United States	1991
Hawk Industries Type 97	Hawk Industries		12 gauge	China	1997
Heckler & Koch FABARM FP6	Fabbrica Bresciana Armi		12 gauge	Italy	1998
Heckler & Koch HK512	Heckler & Koch; Luigi Franchi S.p.A.		12 gauge	Germany; Italy	1980s
Heckler & Koch HK CAWS	Heckler & Koch		12 gauge	West Germany	1980s
High Standard Model 10	High Standard Manufacturing Company		12 gauge	United States	1950s
Hunt MH12			12-gauge	TR	2019
Intrepid RAS-12	Intrepid Tactical Solutions		12 gauge rimless	United States	2013
Ithaca 37	Ithaca Gun Company		12 gauge 16 gauge 20 gauge 28 gauge	United States	1933
Ithaca Auto & Burglar	Ithaca Gun Company		20 gauge 28 gauge	United States	1922
Ithaca Mag-10	Ithaca Gun Company		10 gauge	United States	1975
IWI Tavor TS12	Israel Weapon Industries		12 Gauge	Israel	2018
IZh-12	Izhevsk Mechanical Plant		12 gauge 16 gauge	Soviet Union	1962
IZh-18	Izhevsk Mechanical Plant		12 gauge 16 gauge 20 gauge 28 gauge 32 gauge.410 bore.366 TKM	Soviet Union	1964
IZh-27	Izhevsk Mechanical Plant		12 gauge 16 gauge 20 gauge 32 gauge	Soviet Union	1969
IZh-43	Izhevsk Mechanical Plant		12 gauge 16 gauge.410 bore	Soviet Union	1986
IZh-54	Izhevsk Mechanical Plant		12 gauge	Soviet Union	1954
IZh-56	Izhevsk Mechanical Plant		28 gauge 32 gauge.22 LR	Soviet Union	1956
IZh-58	Izhevsk Mechanical Plant		12 gauge 16 gauge 20 gauge 28 gauge	Soviet Union	1958
IZh-59	Izhevsk Mechanical Plant		12 gauge	Soviet Union	1960
IZh-81	Izhevsk Mechanical Plant		12 gauge	Russia	1993
IZh-94	Izhevsk Mechanical Plant		12 gauge 20 gauge.410 bore.22 LR; 5.6×39mm 7.62×39mm.308 Winchester; 7.62×54mmR	Russia	1993
IZhK	Izhevsk Mechanical Plant		16 gauge 20 gauge 28 gauge 32 gauge	Soviet Union	1955
K12 PUMA	Norinco		12 gauge	China	2006
Knight's Armament Company Masterkey	Knight's Armament Company		12 gauge	United States	1980s
Kel-Tec KSG	Kel-Tec CNC Industries Inc.		12 gauge	United States	2011
KS-23	TsNIITochMash		23x75mmR	Soviet Union	1971
KUGS HD410	KUGS		.410 bore	Switzerland	2022
Ljutic Space Gun	Ljutic Industries		12 gauge	United States	1955
M6 aircrew survival weapon	Ithaca Gun Company		.22 Hornet.410 bore	United States	1952
M26 Modular Accessory Shotgun System	C-More Competition		12 gauge	United States	2002
M30 Luftwaffe Drilling	Sauer & Sohn		9.3x74mmR; 12/65 Gauge	Germany	1941
MAG-7	Techno Arms PTY		12 gauge	South Africa	1995
Manufrance Rapid	Manufrance		12 gauge	France	1958
Manville gun	Charles J. Manville		12 gauge 25mm 37mm	United States	1935
Marble Game Getter	Marble Arms		.22 LR.44 Shotshell.410 bore	United States	1908
Marlin Model 25MG	Marlin Firearms Company		.22 WMR CCI snake shot	United States	1999
Marlin Model 55	Marlin Firearms Company		10 gauge 12 gauge 16 gauge 20 gauge	United States	1954
MAUL (shotgun)	Metal Storm		12 gauge	Australia	2009
Molot Bekas-M	Vyatskiye Polyany		12 gauge 16 gauge	Russia	1999
Mossberg 183	O.F. Mossberg & Sons		.410 bore	United States	1947
Mossberg 185	O.F. Mossberg & Sons		20 gauge	United States	1947
Mossberg 500	O.F. Mossberg & Sons		12 gauge 20 gauge.410 bore	United States	1960
Mossberg 590	O.F. Mossberg & Sons		12 gauge 20 gauge.410 bore	United States	1960
Mossberg 930	O.F. Mossberg & Sons		12 gauge	United States	2000s
Mossberg 9200	O.F. Mossberg & Sons		12 gauge	United States	1992
Mossberg Maverick 88	O.F. Mossberg & Sons		12 gauge 20 gauge	United States	1988
MP-155	Izhevsk Mechanical Plant		12 gauge 20 gauge	Russia	2011
MTs 5	TsKIB SOO		16 gauge 20 gauge 28 gauge 32 gauge	Soviet Union	1950
MTs 6	TsKIB SOO; Tula Arms Plant		12 gauge	Soviet Union	1948
MTs 7	TsKIB SOO		12 gauge 20 gauge 7.62×54mmR; 9×53mmR	Soviet Union	1950s
MTs 8	TsKIB SOO		12 gauge 20 gauge	Soviet Union	1953
MTs 20-01	TsKIB SOO; Tulsky Oruzheiny Zavod		20 gauge 28 gauge 32 gauge	Soviet Union	1957
MTs 21-12	TsKIB SOO; Tula Arms Plant		12 gauge	Soviet Union	1965
MTs 30	TsKIB SOO		12 gauge 9×53mmR	Soviet Union	1958
MTs 109	TsKIB SOO		12 gauge 9×53mmR	Soviet Union	1968
MTs 110	TsKIB SOO		12 gauge 20 gauge 7.62×51mm NATO; 9×53mmR	Soviet Union	2007
MTs 111	TsKIB SOO		12 gauge 7.62×54mmR; 9×53mmR	Soviet Union	1968
MTs255	TsKIB SOO		12 gauge 20 gauge 28 gauge 32 gauge.410 bore	Russia	1993
MTs 260	TsKIB SOO		12 gauge 16 gauge 20 gauge 28 gauge	Russia	1995
NeoStead 2000	Truvelo Armoury		12 gauge	South Africa	1992
New Haven 600	O.F. Mossberg & Sons		12 gauge 16 gauge 20 gauge.410 bore	United States	1977
Norinco HP9-1	Norinco		12 gauge	China	1990s
OTs-28	TsKIB SOO		23x75mmR	Russia	1990s
Pancor Jackhammer	Pancor Corporation		12 gauge	United States	1984
Pindad SG-1	Pindad		12 gauge	Indonesia	2005
Punt gun			2 gauge 8 gauge	United Kingdom	1800s
QBS-09	Norinco		12 gauge	China	2005
Remington Model 10	Remington Arms Company		12 gauge	United States	1908
Remington Model 11	Remington Arms Company		12 gauge 16 gauge 20 gauge	United States	1898
Remington Model 11-48	Remington Arms Company		12 gauge 16 gauge 20 gauge 28 gauge.410 bore	United States	1948
Remington Model 11-87	Remington Arms Company		12 gauge 20 gauge	United States	1987
Remington Model 11-96	Remington Arms Company		12 gauge	United States	1996
Remington Model 17	Remington Arms Company		20 gauge	United States	1913
Remington Model 31	Remington Arms Company		12 gauge 16 gauge 20 gauge	United States	1931
Remington Model 58	Remington Arms Company		12 gauge 16 gauge 20 gauge	United States	1956
Remington Model 870	Remington Arms Company		12 gauge 16 gauge 20 gauge 28 gauge.410 bore	United States	1950
Remington Model 878	Remington Arms Company		12 gauge	United States	1959
Remington Model 887	Remington Arms Company		12 gauge	United States	2009
Remington Model 1100	Remington Arms Company		12 gauge 16 gauge 20 gauge 28 gauge.410 bore	United States	1963
Remington Model 1900	Remington Arms Company		12 and 16 gauge	United States	1900
Remington Model SP-10	Remington Arms Company		10 gauge	United States	1989
Remington Spartan 100	Remington Arms Company		12 gauge 20 gauge.410 bore	Russia	2005
Remington Spartan 310	Izhevsk Mechanical Plant		12 gauge 20 gauge 28 gauge.410 bore	Russia	1977
Remington Spartan 453	Izhevsk Mechanical Plant		12 gauge	Russia	1999
Remington V3	Remington Arms Company		12 gauge	United States	2015
Remington Versa Max	Remington Arms Company		12 gauge	United States	2010
Rexio SpecOps	Rexio			Argentina	2008
RGA-86	Military University of Technology		26 mm Special	Poland	1983
RMB-93	KBP Instrument Design Bureau		12 gauge	Russia	1993
Roper repeating shotgun	Sylvester H. Roper		12 gauge 16 gauge	United States	1867
Ruger Gold Label	Sturm, Ruger & Company		12 gauge	United States	2002
Ruger Red Label	Sturm, Ruger & Company		12 gauge 20 gauge 28 gauge	United States	1978
Safir T-14	AKSA Int Arms		.410 bore	Turkey	2001
Saiga-12	Izhmash		12 gauge 20 gauge.410 bore	Russia	1990s
Savage Model 24	Stevens Arms; Savage Arms		.22 long rifle.410 bore	United States	1938
Serbu Super-Shorty	Serbu Firearms		12 gauge 20 gauge	United States	1996
Sjögren shotgun	Håndvåbenværkstederne Kjöbenhavn		12 gauge	Sweden	1908
Smith & Wesson 1000 Series	Smith & Wesson		12 gauge 20 gauge	Turkey	2007
Smith & Wesson AS	Smith & Wesson		12 gauge 12 gauge flechette	United States	1980s
Smith & Wesson Elite Series	Smith & Wesson		12 gauge 20 gauge	Turkey	2007
Smith & Wesson Model 916	Smith & Wesson		12 gauge	United States	1970s
Smith & Wesson Model 1000	Howa		12 gauge 20 gauge	Japan	1973
Smith & Wesson Model 3000	Howa		12 gauge 20 gauge	Japan	1979
Snake Charmer	H.Koon, Inc, of Dallas, Texas		.410 bore	United States	1978
Spencer 1882	Spencer Arms Company		10 gauge 12 gauge	United States	1882
Springfield Armory M6 Scout	Springfield Armory		.22 long rifle.22 Winchester Magnum Rimfire.22 Hornet.410 bore	United States	1970s
SRM Arms Model 1216	SRM Arms		12 gauge	United States	2010
Standard Manufacturing DP-12	Standard Manufacturing		12 gauge	United States	2015
Stevens Model 77E	Stevens Arms		12 gauge	United States	1963
Stevens Model 311	Stevens Arms		12 gauge 16 gauge 20 gauge.410 bore	United States	1920
Stevens Model 520/620	Stevens Arms		12 Gauge; 16 Gauge; 20 Gauge	United States	1909
Stoeger Coach Gun	E.R. Amantino		12 gauge	Brazil	1962
Stoeger Condor	E.R. Amantino		12 gauge 16 gauge 20 gauge.410 bore	Brazil	1990s
TOZ-28	Tula Arms Plant		20 gauge 7.62×38mmR; 6.5×38mmR	Soviet Union	1960s
TOZ-34	Tula Arms Plant		12 gauge 20 gauge 28 gauge 32 gauge	Soviet Union	1964
TOZ-55	Tula Arms Plant		12 gauge 9×53mmR	Soviet Union	1975
TOZ-57	Tula Arms Plant		12 gauge	Soviet Union	1970s
TOZ-66	Tula Arms Plant		12 gauge	Soviet Union	1968
TOZ-84	Tula Arms Plant		12 gauge.22 long rifle 9×53mmR	Soviet Union	1980s
TOZ-87	TsKIB SOO; Tula Arms Plant		12 gauge	Soviet Union	1987
TOZ-106	Tula Arms Plant		20 gauge	Russia	1993
TOZ-194	Tula Arms Plant		12 gauge	Russia	1990s
TOZ-250	Tula Arms Plant		16 gauge.22 long rifle	Soviet Union	1960s
TP-82	Igor Aleksandrovich Skrylev		12.5×70mm shotgun 5.45×39mm	Soviet Union	1986
TTs 22	TsKIB SOO		12 gauge	Soviet Union	1986
UTAS UTS-15	UTAS		12 gauge	Turkey	2012
UTAS XTR-12	UTAS		12 gauge	Turkey	2017
Valtro PM-5	Valtro		12 gauge	Italy	1980s
Vepr-12	Molot Oruzhie Ltd.		7.62×39mm 12 gauge	Russia	2003
Walther automatic shotgun	Walther		12/65 Gauge	Germany	1918
Weatherby Orion	Weatherby		12 gauge	United States	2014
Weatherby PA-08	ATA arms		12 gauge	United States; Turkey	2008
Weatherby SA-08	ATA arms		12 gauge 20 gauge	United States; Turkey	2008
Winchester Liberator	Winchester Repeating Arms Company		16 gauge 12 gauge	United States	1962
Winchester Model 20	Winchester Repeating Arms Company		.410 bore	United States	1920
Winchester Model 21	Winchester Repeating Arms Company		12 gauge 16 gauge 20 gauge 28 gauge.410 bore	United States	1930
Winchester Model 37	Winchester Repeating Arms Company		12 gauge 16 gauge 20 gauge 28 gauge.410 bore	United States	1936
Winchester Model 1200	Winchester Repeating Arms Company		12 gauge 16 gauge 20 gauge	United States	1964
Winchester Model 1887/1901	Winchester Repeating Arms Company		10 gauge 12 gauge	United States	1887
Winchester Model 1893	Winchester Repeating Arms Company		12 gauge	United States	1893
Winchester M1897 Trench Shotgun	Winchester Repeating Arms Company		12 gauge	United States	1897
Winchester Model 1911	Winchester Repeating Arms Company		12 gauge 16 gauge 20 gauge 28 gauge	United States	1911
Winchester Model 1912	Winchester Repeating Arms Company		12 gauge 16 gauge 20 gauge 28 gauge	United States	1912
Zastava LP 12 PAS	Zastava Arms		12 gauge	Yugoslavia	1993

== See also ==
- Assault shotgun
- Automatic shotgun
- Combat shotgun
- List of bullpup firearms
- List of combat shotguns
- List of multiple-barrel firearms
- List of revolvers
- List of semi-automatic shotguns
- Riot shotgun
- Semi-automatic shotgun
- List of rifles
