= List of combat shotguns =

This is a list of combat shotguns: shotguns that have been designed for use in warfare, and have been used by law enforcement or military units.

The table is sortable for every column.

Name	Manufacturer	Image	Mode of firing	Country	Year
Armsel Striker	Armsel		Semi-automatic	South Africa	1981
Atchisson AA-12	Maxwell Atchisonn		Fully automatic	United States	1972
Benelli Nova	Benelli Armi SpA		Pump action	Italy	1990s
Benelli M3	Benelli Armi SpA		Pump action or Semi-automatic	Italy	1989
Benelli M1014	Benelli Armi SpA		Semi-automatic	Italy	1998
Benelli Supernova	Benelli Armi SpA		Pump action	Italy	2000s
Beretta 1301	Beretta		Semi-automatic	Italy	2014
Browning Auto-5	Browning Arms Company		Semi-automatic	United States	1898
Daewoo Precision Industries USAS-12	S&T Motiv (formerly S&T Daewoo)		Semi-automatic	South Korea	1989
Standard Manufacturing DP-12	Standard Manufacturing		Bullpup pump action double-barreled shotgun	United States	2015
Franchi Special Purpose Automatic Shotgun 12	Luigi Franchi		Pump action or Semi-automatic	Italy	1979
Franchi SPAS-15	Luigi Franchi		Pump action or Semi-automatic	Italy	1986
Hawk Industries Type 97	Norinco		Pump action or Semi-automatic	PRC	1990s
Heckler & Koch HK CAWS	Heckler & Koch		Fully automatic	Germany	1980s
FABARM FP6	FABARM		Pump action	Italy	1998
High Standard Model 10	High Standard Manufacturing Company		Bullpup Semi-automatic	United States	1967
Ithaca 37	Ithaca Gun Company		Pump action	United States	1933
Tavor TS12	IWI		Bullpup Semi-automatic	Israel	2018
Kel-Tec KSG	Kel-Tec		Bullpup pump action	United States	2011
KAC Masterkey	Knight's Armament Company		Pump action	United States	1980s
KS-23	TsNIITochMash		Pump action	Soviet Union	1971
M26 Modular Accessory Shotgun System	C-More Competition		Bolt action	United States	2002
Mossberg 500	O.F. Mossberg & Sons		Pump action	United States	1960
NeoStead 2000	Truvelo Armoury		Pump action	South Africa	2001
Pindad SG-1	Pindad		Semi-automatic shotgun	Indonesia	2005
QBS-09	Norinco		Semi-automatic shotgun	PRC	2009
Remington Model 10	Remington Arms		Pump action	United States	1908
Remington Model 870	Remington Arms		Pump action	United States	1950
RMB-93	KBP Instrument Design Bureau		Pump action	Russia	1993
Saiga-12	Izhmash		Semi-automatic	Russia	1990s
SRM Arms Model 1216	SRM Arms		Semi-automatic	United States	2011
Stevens Model 520/620	Stevens Arms		Pump action	United States	1909
Stevens Model 77E	Stevens Arms		Pump action	United States	1963
TOZ-194	Tula Arms Plant		Pump action	Russia	1990s
UTAS XTR-12	UTAS Defence of Turkey		Semi-automatic	Turkey	2017
UTAS UTS-15	UTAS USA		Pump action	Turkey	2006
Vepr-12	Molot-Oruzhie Ltd		Semi-automatic	Russia	2000s
Winchester Model 1200	Winchester Repeating Arms Company		Pump action	United States	1964
Winchester M1897 Trench Shotgun	Winchester Repeating Arms Company		Pump action	United States	1897
Winchester Model 1912	Winchester Repeating Arms Company		Pump action	United States	1912

== See also ==
- Pump action
- Automatic shotgun
- Combat shotgun
- List of individual weapons of the U.S. Armed Forces
- List of shotguns
- Riot shotgun
- Semi-automatic shotgun
