= 1984 Hot Springs motel shooting =

Mass shooting in Arkansas, U.S.

- Location: 1127 Central Avenue, Hot Springs, Arkansas, U.S.
- Date: July 24, 1984; 5:45 p.m. – 7:00 p.m. (CDT)
- Attack type: Mass shooting; mass murder; murder-suicide; shootout
- Weapons: .45 caliber Colt M1911 semi-automatic pistol; 12-gauge Smith & Wesson Model 3000 pump-action shotgun
- Deaths: 6 (including the perpetrator and a victim who died in 1986)
- Injuries: 2 (including 1 by stray police gunfire)
- Perpetrator: Wayne Lee Crossley
- Motive: Inconclusive

On July 24, 1984, a mass shooting occurred at the Grand Central Motor Lodge in Hot Springs, Arkansas, United States.

At around 5:45 p.m., the perpetrator, 31-year-old Wayne Lee Crossley, first engaged in a shootout with a police officer during a traffic stop, wounding each other. Crossley then drove a short distance to the Grand Central Motor Lodge, entered The Other Place Lounge (a bar within the motel) and opened fire with a pistol and a shotgun. He killed four people (including a truck driver outside) and wounded another before committing suicide.

== Shooting ==
At around 5:45 p.m., Hot Springs Police Sgt. Wayne Warwick stopped Crossley's vehicle for a traffic violation at Ouachita Avenue near the Garland County Courthouse. There were three other passengers in the car at the time of the stop: Jerry C. Wooten, Raymond Wooten, and Carl Langley. Soon after, Crossley stepped out of the car, drew out a .45-caliber Colt M1911 semi-automatic pistol and engaged in a shootout with Warwick, who was shot multiple times in the back, neck, and leg. Jerry Wooten was struck in the forearm by a stray bullet during the exchange of gunfire between Crossley and Sgt. Warwick.

Bleeding from a gunshot wound to the stomach sustained during the shootout with Warwick, Crossley drove to the Grand Central Motor Lodge at the corner of Grand and Central avenues at around 5:55 p.m. before he headed inside The Other Place Lounge (a bar inside the motel). As he entered, he opened fired with his handgun, killing bar manager Helen Frazee and patrons Juanita Allen and James Stephens and wounding patron John Crue.

After the initial shooting in the lounge, Crossley went back out to his car to grab a 12-gauge Smith & Wesson Model 3000 pump-action shotgun from the trunk of the car. He then shot and killed Tom Altringer, a truck driver, in the parking lot before he returned into the lounge.

After a brief standoff with the SWAT team, Crossley fatally shot himself through the heart with his .45-caliber handgun about an hour and 15 minutes after the initial shooting began.

== Victims ==
=== Deceased ===
- Helen Frazee: 52, proprietor of The Other Place Lounge
- Juanita Ritchie Allen: 45, a patron visiting Frazee
- James Faucette Stephens: 55, a patron from Little Rock
- Tomas Ray Altringer: 34, a truck driver from Fargo, North Dakota; shot in the parking lot
- Sgt. Wayne Warwick: 36, survived the initial shooting but died on September 5, 1986, from a blood clot related to his injuries

=== Wounded ===
- John David Crue: 34, a bar patron from Lonsdale who was critically wounded but survived.

== Perpetrator ==
Wayne Lee Crossley (December 10, 1952 - July 24, 1984) was from Benton, Arkansas.

Approximately 8 days before the shooting, on July 16, Crossley and a friend, Ruby Swint, purchased a .45 caliber Colt M1911 semi-automatic pistol and a 12-gauge Smith & Wesson Model 3000 pump-action shotgun from Olive's Sporting Goods. They told the salesman that they wanted to purchase guns for Swint's protection, but even though Swint filled out the necessary forms, the guns were paid for by Crossley.

== See also ==
- List of mass shootings in the United States (1900–1999)
- San Ysidro McDonald's massacre, a mass shooting which happened less than a week prior
