= Smith & Wesson Model 916 =

- Type: Pump-action shotgun
- Place of origin: United States

Production history
- Manufacturer: Smith & Wesson
- Produced: 1973–1980
- No. built: 10,000+
- Variants: 916T (takedown); 916A (tactical)

Specifications
- Mass: 7 1/4 lb (3.3 kg) (28" barrel)
- Length: 48 in (120 cm) (28" barrel)
- Barrel length: 26, 28, 30 in (66, 71, 76 cm)
- Cartridge: 12-gauge
- Action: Pump action
- Sights: Front bead

The Smith & Wesson Model 916 is a pump-action 12-gauge shotgun produced by Smith & Wesson during the 1970s.

== History ==
Noble Manufacturing Company of Haydenville village within Williamsburg, Massachusetts, was a small gunmaker that produced shotguns and .22 caliber rifles. Noble, incorporated in 1943, was in bankruptcy as of mid-1971, and went out of business in 1973. In 1972, Smith & Wesson—located in Springfield, approximately 25 miles (40 km) from Haydenville—bought patents and tooling for Noble's Model 66, a 12-gauge pump-action shotgun.

In 1973, Smith & Wesson produced the shotgun as their Model 916, with a sportsman version (916), takedown version (916T), and tactical version (916A). The guns were plagued by a variety of quality issues, including a recall due to a safety issue with barrels of the 916T version rupturing. The series was later discontinued in 1980 and replaced by the pump-action Model 3000 and the semi-automatic Model 1000.
