= 12P =

12P may refer to:

- 12P/Pons-Brooks, a comet
- Noon
- Pallister-Killian syndrome or Tetrasomy 12p, a genetic disorder
- The Piaget 12P, a slim automatic watch movement.

== See also ==
- P12 (disambiguation)
