= UTAS UTS-15 =

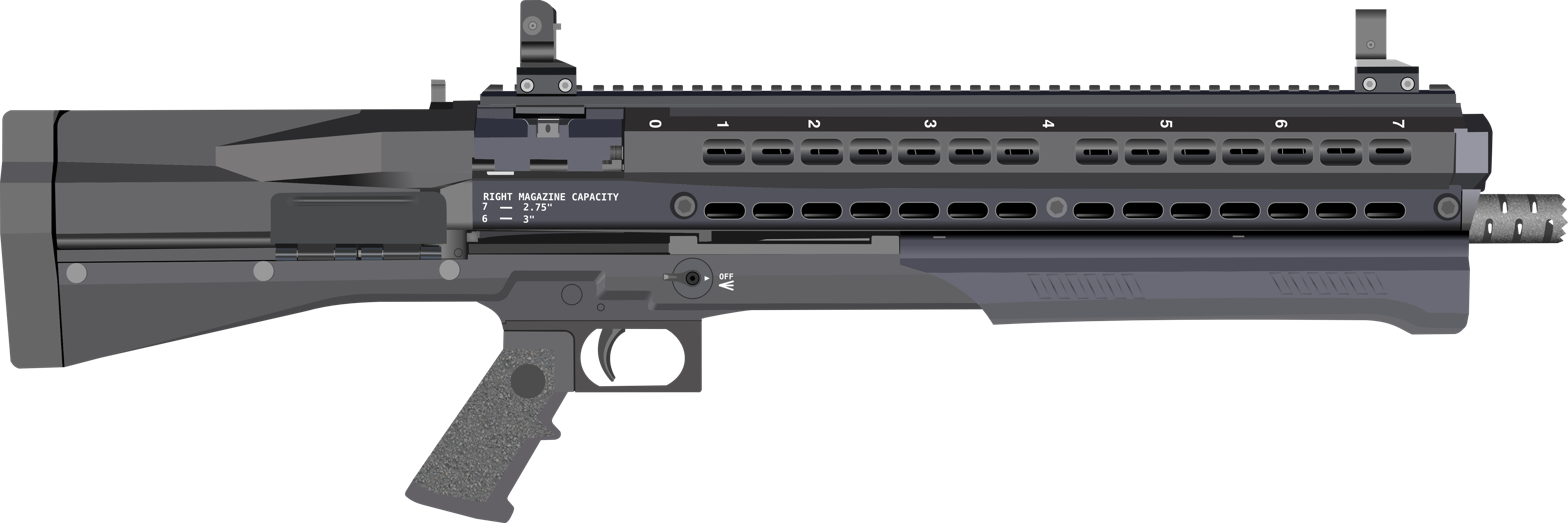
- The UTAS UTS-15
- Type: Pump-action shotgun
- Place of origin: Turkey

Production history
- Designed: 2006–2012
- Manufacturer: UTAS
- Produced: 2012–present
- Variants: UTS-15 Desert; UTS-15 Marine; UTS-15 Hunting

Specifications
- Mass: 6.9 lb (3.1 kg) empty
- Length: 28.3 in (72 cm)
- Barrel length: 18.5 in (47 cm)
- Cartridge: 12 gauge
- Action: Pump-action
- Feed system: Dual, selectable 7-round tube magazines
- Sights: Picatinny rail provided for optics

The UTAS UTS-15 is a 12 gauge pump-action shotgun made by UTAŞ Defense of Turkey, with two 7-round magazine tubes that can feed in an alternating or selecting pattern.

== Background ==
The UTS-15 was developed as a result of a request to UTAS made by Smith & Wesson in 2006 to develop "the ultimate police shotgun".

Smith & Wesson's criteria for the shotgun were: 12-Gauge, pump-action, less than 30" overall length, and 13-round minimum capacity.

== Features ==
The UTS-15 has a 28.3" overall length with an 18.5" barrel, chambered for 2½", 2¾", and 3" magnum ammunition. Constructed primarily of fiber-reinforced injection molded polymer, the UTS-15 weighs 6.9 lbs.

Additionally, there is a top-mounted picatinny rail for the mounting of a wide variety of both iron and optical sights, coupled with Beretta-style barrel threading for choke tubes.

The following features are standard on all UTS-15 models:

- Bullpup design: pistol grip and trigger are located forward of the barrel breech and action assembly. This allows for the same barrel length as a traditional shotgun but shortens the overall length of the weapon.
- Top-mounted picatinny rail: allows for the mounting of a wide variety of iron and optical sights.
- Twin magazine tubes: set above the barrel to allow for easy access to the loading ports.
- Alternating or select tube feed: a selector switch located on the top of the tube/barrel assembly allows for use of multiple ammo types (i.e.: buckshot and birdshot; buckshot and rubber pellets; etc.).
- Built-in laser/light controls: the right side of the grip is reserved for controls (a button) for controlling the optional light and laser assembly.
- Threaded barrel: Beretta-style barrel threading for choke tubes allows the UTS-15 to be adapted for any situation and a range of attachments.

=== Accessories ===
- Front and rear sight assembly: machined from a solid billet of 7000 series ordinance aluminium with matte black anodized finish these sights are elevation and windage adjustable.
- Tactical Choke Tube: machined from 4140 ordinance grade steel and matte black oxide finished. This choke features muzzle spikes and gas ports for breaching. Also considered a choked cylinder it can be used for firing slugs as well as buck shot.
- 7.5" Barrel Extension: machined from 4140 ordnance grade steel with a matte black oxide finish. This attachment is threaded to screw into the UTS-15 barrel (like the Tactical Choke Tube).
- Red Laser/Flashlight Unit: the laser/flashlight unit is specially designed for the UTS-15 shotgun. The flashlight casts a 200 lumen lens focused beam when switched on (using the integrated control button on the grip). The laser is high-intensity and adjustable for both windage and elevation. The machined aluminum housing for the laser/flashlight holds two lithium batteries and is specifically designed to slide into the barrel retaining tube in the lower stock below the barrel where it is held in place by the barrel retaining cap. The UTAS provided set comes with the necessary equipment for mounting the assembly into the shotgun.

== Variants ==
- UTS-15 Desert: features a digitized camo pattern used by both American and NATO forces. Incorporates a desert sand base coat over which the two-color non-glare digital camouflage pattern is applied.
- UTS-15 Marine: features a digitized camo pattern which incorporates a marine blue base coat over which the black and gray non-glare digital camouflage pattern is applied. The springs have a corrosion-resistant coating and all exposed metal parts are satin nickel-plated to be resistant to saltwater. All other metal parts, such as the barrel are black chromed or similarly treated to further increase saltwater corrosion resistance. Also used by Amphibious Marine Brigade (Turkish Armed Forces)
- UTS-15 Hunting: features a hunting-style camouflage pattern.
- UTS-15A: A semi-automatic variant of the UTS-15, currently in development.

== Critical reception and malfunctions ==
Due to its unique design, the UTS-15 became an easily recognizable weapon within the firearms culture and was reviewed by several different sources. However, over time the UTS-15 became the subject of harsh criticism in the firearms industry developing a reputation for being plagued by numerous malfunctions (primarily failure to feed and failure to extract). UTAS attempted to correct these issues by developing a generation 2 and generation 3 variant of the UTS-15 that were supposed to correct the reliability issue.

== Users ==
- Hong Kong
  - Hong Kong Correctional Service Regional Response Team
- Turkey
  - Amphibious Marine Brigade

== See also ==
- List of bullpup firearms
- List of shotguns
- Kel-Tec KSG
- NeoStead 2000
