= Rexio SpecOps =

- Type: Shotgun
- Place of origin: Argentina

Service history
- Used by: Argentine Army

Production history
- Manufacturer: Rexio
- Produced: 2008

The SpecOps is a Pump action shotgun manufacturer of Argentina, by Rexio.

== Development ==
It was created taking into account the needs of law enforcement and military Tactical Teams, who know the actions of terrorist groups and criminal. This model is designed entirely in steel, but with the distinction of being much lighter than previous models Rexio

== Description ==
It has a 3-position retractable stock. Picatinny rail mounted laser sights. Ring type Ghost rise and script. It also has a cannon heatsink covers.
