= Winchester Model 20 =

- Type: Shotgun
- Place of origin: United States

Production history
- Manufacturer: Winchester
- Produced: 1920-1924
- No. built: 24,000

Specifications
- Caliber: 410-gauge
- Action: Break-action
- Feed system: Manual, break open action

The Winchester Model 20 is a single-barreled shotgun that was produced from 1920 to 1924.

It is not semi-automatic or pump-action, and is loaded manually by lifting up the barrel and loading the shells at the breech. This is called a break or hinge action. The model 20 came in .410 bore.

The total production reached approximately 24,000.

== Resources ==
- Sparetimeactivities.net profile
