= BSA experimental model 1949 =

BSA Experimental Model 1
- Type: Submachine gun
- Place of origin: United Kingdom

Production history
- Designed: 1949
- Manufacturer: Gun Division, The Birmingham Small Arms Company Limited

Specifications
- Cartridge: 9×19mm Parabellum
- Calibre: 9 mm
- Action: Blowback
- Rate of fire: 600 rounds/min
- Muzzle velocity: 1,200 ft/s (365 m/s)
- Effective firing range: 100/200 yds
- Maximum firing range: 200 yds
- Feed system: 32-round box magazine
- Sights: Iron

The BSA Experimental Model 1949 was a submachine gun of British origin intended to replace the Sten submachine gun. The weapon was fed from a 32-round box magazine inserted in the side and had an unusual twist-action bakelite-covered handguard.

== Development ==
Following the end of World War Two, the British Army sought a replacement for the Sten which was the submachine gun of the British military since 1940. The Sten was simple, cheap and unrefined. While this very crudity was a positive asset in the straitened circumstances the British found themselves in during the war, a more refined and durable variant was requested. The Sten Mark V was developed to fill this need during 1944, adding a wooden stock, forward pistol grip and better construction. However, by the late 1940s the British Army was testing replacements. The Welgun developed by BSA during the war was briefly considered as was a design from Enfield. However, the Patchett Machine Carbine Mk 1. made by the Sterling Armaments Company which had been trialled during the war was chosen and as the Sterling submachine gun entered service in 1953.

However, there was another contender which was also made by BSA. The "Experimental Machine Carbine, 1949" (EMC). Chambered in the same 9 mm Parabellum cartridge as the Sten with a side-mounted 32-round box magazine, shared by the Sten and later the Sterling. The EMC used blowback action but cycled, faster than the Sterling and all of the earlier Sten variants, at 600 rounds per minute. It came with unusual features, notably a Bakelite pump action foregrip, a hinged magazine insert which could be pivoted backwards to allow jams to be cleared without having to remove the magazine and to facilitate cleaning, and a safety switch in the pistol grip, easily operated by the users thumb. Regardless of the EMC's innovative features the design was not adopted.

== Overview ==
The BSA Machine Carbine is a blowback-operated, magazine-fed weapon chambered in the 9×19mm round. Unusually the weapon lacks a bolt handle; instead it came with a pump-action foregrip operated by pushing it forward and then pulling it back; this pushed a bar which pushed the bolt back and cocked the weapon. The grip was then rotated slightly to disengage the bar and allow the bolt to cycle once fired. In response to the Welgun's open receiver, the EMC was enclosed with only the magazine insert and ejection port open when firing. When the bolt was closed, these openings were covered, minimising the chances of dirt entering the action.
