= Remington Model 887 =

Remington 887 Nitro Mag
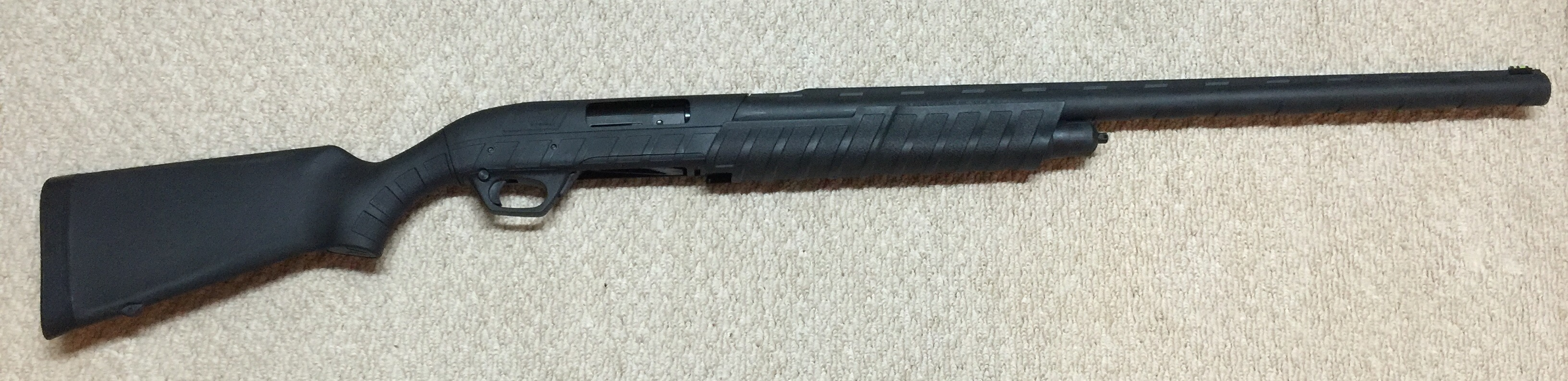
- Type: Shotgun
- Place of origin: United States

Service history
- Used by: See Users

Production history
- Manufacturer: Remington Arms
- Produced: 2009–2015
- Variants: Nitro Mag Waterfowl, Nitro Magnum Tactical, RealTree Camo Waterfowl edition, Turkey edition (22" barrel)

Specifications
- Mass: 7.375 pounds (3.3 kg)
- Length: 48.5 inches (1,230 mm)
- Barrel length: 28 inches (710 mm)
- Cartridge: 12 Gauge (2 ¾, 3, and 3 ½-inch)
- Action: Pump-action
- Feed system: 4+1 rounds (7+1 for the tactical model), internal tube magazine
- Sights: Hi-Viz LitePipe front bead, polymer mid-bead

The Remington Model 887 Nitro Mag is a pump-action shotgun formerly manufactured by Remington Arms Company, Inc. It is noted for using a polymer finish called ArmorLokt, which is designed to survive any type of weather condition and leaves no exterior surfaces to rust. This gives the 887 a "space age" look which is one of the gun's more defining features.

== Design and features ==
=== Target market and positioning ===
As the name suggests, the 887 Nitro Mag can chamber 3 ½″ magnum shells. In this way, it competes with the Mossberg 835 Ulti-Mag, which is designed specifically for firing 3 ½″ magnum shells. The look of the 887 is also frequently compared to that of the Benelli Nova. The Remington 887 brochure positioned the firearm in this market by comparing it to the Mossberg 835 and the Benelli Nova.

=== Function and Remington Model 870 comparison ===
The core design, specifically, the receiver and the barrel, is based upon that of the famous Remington 870, although the 887 employs a significantly redesigned action, with rotating bolt-head locking lugs in lieu of the single lifting lug used in the 870. These make up the steel "core" of the 887. However, besides this, the 887 actually differs fairly significantly from the 870, and is not designed to replace the 870.

The 887 offers several changes from the 870's design, usually in the name of user-friendliness. The slide release, for example, is a large, triangular button located on the top half of the trigger guard's face which is easy to with gloves on. This is in contrast to the 870, where the slide release is a small metal tab located to the left of the trigger guard.

The 28" Nitro Mag barrel is threaded for the standard Remington Rem-Choke system. This enables the barrel to be choked in a variety of constrictions ranging from .727" cylinder choke to .682" extra-full.

=== ArmorLokt finish ===
The 887's most striking feature is the ArmorLokt finish. The entire receiver and barrel of the 887 is coated with .041" (1.0mm) thick glass-filled nylon material via an overmolding process which protects the steel interior of the gun. In this way, the steel provides the strength for the gun while the polymer protects the inner workings from the elements, including inclement weather and resulting corrosion. Manufacturers have come up with several ways to help protect a gun's metal surface, but overmolding the gun with a polymer is a unique concept.

Remington claims that the ArmorLokt finish is impenetrable, and has several tests to help back up this claim. Company engineers subjected the 887 to salt-corrosion and submersion tests and checked for leaks and separation in the polymer, and none were found. A second test was conducted, where over 10,000 rounds were discharged through a single 887 barrel, and the barrel's coating showed no signs of separation. Smaller tests have been conducted by reviewers which somewhat verify these results.

Several key parts of the gun are not treated with the ArmorLokt process. Noted on several sites are issues with the fore end tube assembly having rust directly from the factory.

The surface of the barrel, receiver, and synthetic fore-end has a tire-tread pattern to make a non-slip surface. It also gives the gun a unique look, which is often criticized.

=== Integral design features ===
Externally, the molded polymeric coating enabled Remington to add desirable features at extremely low cost, such as a top rail, a front sight, sling swivel studs, and an extended fore end. In addition, the plastic may be easily drilled by the user to add additional sights and components. The plastic exterior also facilitated the addition of the large triangular action lock release button.

Internally, the rotating bolt, action assembly, and trigger assembly were all intended to be improvements on past technology, and the gun was designed for easier disassembly and cleaning.

Market reception for these efforts was mixed. Many parts were designed to be lightweight and thus easily bent by traditional gun cleaning and disassembly methods, and often allowed movement resulting in "rattle" which is often a criticism of inexpensive shotguns. As a result, many of these intended advances were perceived as a cheapening of the Remington brand.

== Variations ==
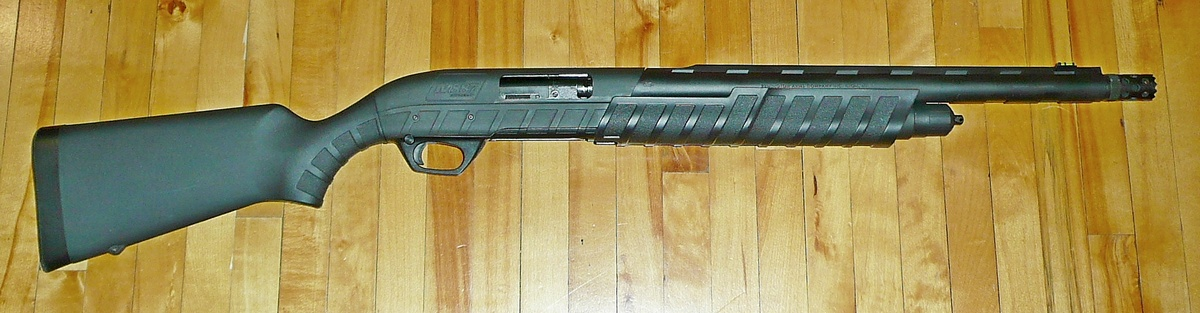
Remington 887 Nitro Mag Tactical Custom (with a 18.5 inch barrel and muzzle standoff attachment fitted in place of a choke)

Remington was initially marketing two versions of the 887, the 887 Nitro Mag and the 887 Nitro Mag Waterfowl. Remington has released several new models including 887 Nitro Mag Tactical, 887 Nitro Mag Bone Collector, and 887 Nitro Mag Camo Combo.

The Tactical model is similar to the base model, but with an 18.5 inch barrel, a magazine extension tube, and 2 Picatinny mounting rails. The 887 Nitro Mag Waterfowl is very similar to the base version, with the main difference being the finish. The waterfowl version includes a finish covered in Mossy Oak's Break-Up Infinity and also Realtree Advantage Max-4 HD camo, which makes it ideal for hunting, as per its namesake. The 887 Waterfowl is also slightly heavier than the 887.

== Recall ==
Remington Arms, at the time part of Cerberus Capital Management's Freedom Group, did a voluntary recall on all Model 887 shotguns manufactured between Dec. 1, 2013 and Nov. 24, 2014 for safety reasons. Remington flagged these guns over a defect that might bind the firing pin to the forward position. If a round is chambered with the firing pin locked forward it's possible the shotgun may fire, resulting in an unintentional discharge or "slam fire".

Remington continued production of Model 887 shotguns as the issue wasn't inherent to the 887 design, stating that the problem was due to some flawed components that were put into production firearms. The company provided a method for checking serial numbers, and provided prepaid return boxes for owners of affected firearms. Returned guns were inspected and punch-marked on the bolt to indicate that the guns were returned, checked, repaired if necessary and test-fired to ensure they were functioning properly. Subsequent production models carried the punch mark.

Recall information is no longer published by Remington Arms; last recorded on the Internet Archive in May 2022.

Model 887 shotguns produced prior to the recall period were not serviced and punched and the data for verifying serial numbers is no longer available. New 887 owners must not load the magazine or chamber a round until it can be done in a controlled environment with the gun held firmly in a shooting position, with the muzzle pointed safely downrange for discharge. If the action, bolt and firing pin are to be tested under any other circumstances it must be done with a snap cap, which is a protective device to permit dry firing without damage to the firing pin. In all circumstances follow Standard Test Method for the Examination and Testing of Firearms. As with any used firearm, new owners should first submit the gun to inspection by a gunsmith.

== Reception, discontinuation, legacy ==
Introduced in 2009, the 887 gained immediate interest among Remington enthusiasts eager to have a "Big Green" alternative to the Mossberg 835 or the Benelli Nova.

Initial reaction by the firearms press was also positive: "It's a different animal, if you will — a new idea in shotgun making. Its lines are contemporary and its construction is a bit radical."

The waterproof design, large plastic lock release button, extended fore end and ergonomic handling, "hi viz" front sight, integrally molded barrel rail, and cushioned recoil pad were well received.

The design advancements were worth noting, but added to the complexity of the gun: "Like the field model, the 887 Tactical's modular trigger-plate assembly completely drops out of the gun via two push pins. This unit contains all fire controls, the carrier and the shell latches. The left latch, similar to the 870, allows manual unloading of the shotgun. Instead of cycling the pump, one can depress the latch to unload."

Among some users, the design advancements were not well received. Lightweight parts such as the ejection port cover would move irregularly, and the action would bind if the fore end wasn't fully and firmly positioned at each end of travel, a condition called "short-shucking" by pump shotgun enthusiasts. Breakdown and servicing, designed to be theoretically easier, was so effectively designed that many owners had parts flying out of the gun. Some found reassembly to be troublesome; most notorious are the action bars which must be fed into narrow plastic slots. Owners accustomed to prying parts in and out of traditional designs would easily bend the ends of the latch bars, and the gun would then fail to cycle. Shotgun owners accustomed to using compressed air to blow dirt and grime from the internal parts were prone to causing similar problems and render the gun inoperable.

Within a few months of its 2009 introduction, the 887 was the subject of growing frustration and suspicion on Remington discussion groups and chat boards, while other owners praised its versatility and performance.

A blog opinion post by noted firearm author and reviewer Randy Wakeman, titled "The Clunker of 2009 Award Goes To..." was a tough blow to public perception. Wakeman stated that the 887 "is the worst shotgun I've tested in a decade," and went on to relate experiences including low patterning, as well as the troublesome load failures, sticky slides, rattling and short shucking. Remington's response was that people had received pre-production models. Other critics mentioned the appearance of the "ArmorLokt" finish, stating that the design was similar to a truck tire tread.

=== Discontinuation ===
Many of the problems seemed to lessen after a year, word among enthusiasts was that Remington's first production run had been disastrous but the bugs were resolved by 2011. Troubles resumed in 2014 when owners started to report unintended firing and slam-firing, resulting in a voluntary recall. Remington discontinued the 887 less than a year later, giving it a lifespan of 2009–2015. There are no published production numbers.

=== Legacy and future collectability ===
New 887s lingered on discount racks and big box outlets for a few years, a result of sluggish sales, overproduction, or both. Despite the negative publicity during its brief production run, the gun continues to trade in used markets, auction sites, and local shops and is likely to do so for the foreseeable future.

After a decade in circulation, the gun began to overcome some of the negative publicity. Owners wrote new reviews with largely favorable comments, such as "the durability of this shotgun is simply incredible" and "nearly a decade of use has this shotgun at the top of my favorites list."

As the life cycle of the 887 and owner experience continues, the shared knowledge base and understanding of the gun's operation and maintenance has expanded. This, and the growing number of online how-to videos combine to enable owners to properly clean and maintain the 887 Nitro Mag. Since the voluntary recall expired, many 887 owners claim that proper cleaning of the rotating bolt and trigger assembly safeguards against unintended firing, with some stating that the 2014 era problems were most likely due to a lack of cleaning.

Collectability is growing among enthusiasts who perceive the Remington 887 to be versatile, serviceable, and affordable. As of 2024, value ranged from $370 to $480.

== Users ==
- Serbia: Used by Serbian Gendarmerie.
- South Africa: Seen used by Cape Town Metropolitan Police.

== See also ==
- Remington Model 10
- Remington 870
- Benelli Nova
