= KS-23 =

Soviet pump-action heavy shotgun

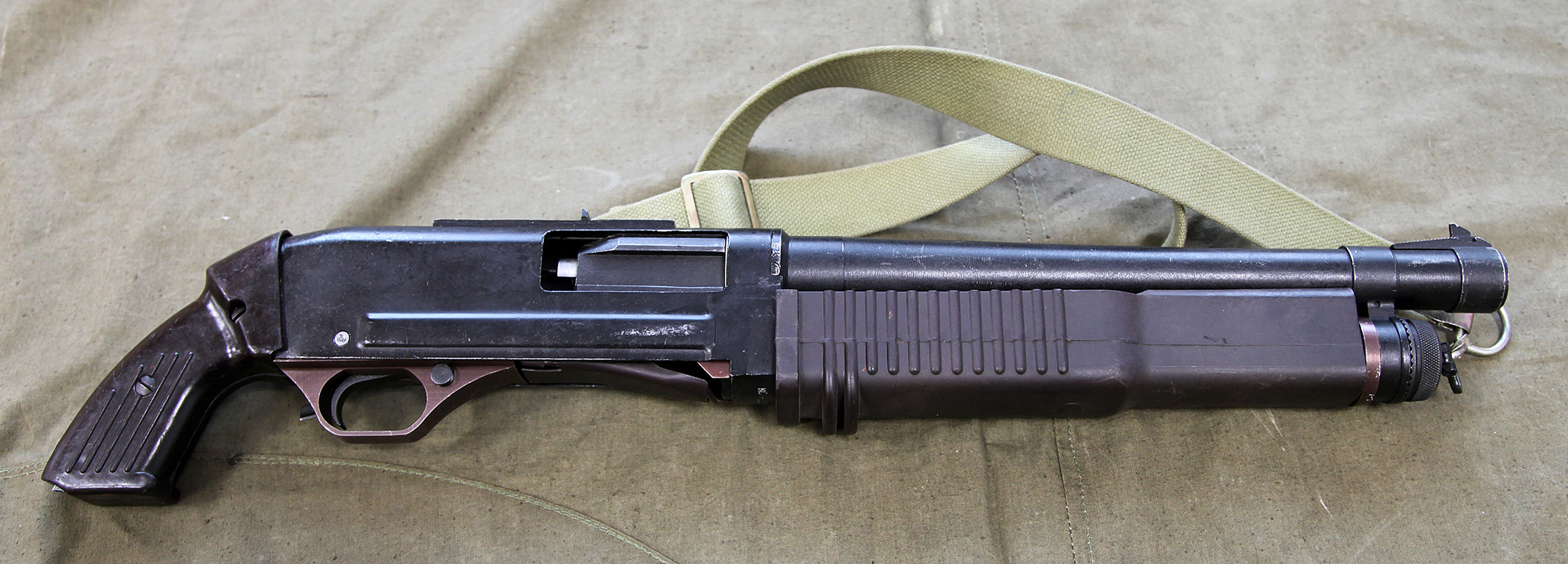
- KS-23M Variant
- Type: Shotgun
- Place of origin: Soviet Union

Service history
- In service: 1985–present
- Used by: See Users

Production history
- Designer: TsNIITochMash
- Designed: 1971–early 1980s
- Manufacturer: Tula Arms Plant
- Produced: 1985–present
- Variants: KS-23; KS-23-1; KS-23M; KS-23K; TOZ-123

Specifications
- Mass: 3.85 kg (8.5 lb) (KS-23); 3.5 kg (7.7 lb) (KS-23M)
- Length: 1,040 mm (41 in) (KS-23); 650–875 mm (25.6–34.4 in) (KS-23M, without/with stock)
- Barrel length: 510 mm (20 in) (KS-23); 350 mm (14 in) (KS-23M)
- Cartridge: 23×75mmR
- Caliber: 23 mm (0.91 in)(or 6 gauge)
- Barrels: 1, with rifled bore
- Action: Pump action, multilugged rotating bolt
- Effective firing range: 150 m (160 yd) (KS-23, KS-23M); 100 m (110 yd) (KS-23k)
- Feed system: 3+1 shells in underbarrel tube (KS-23); 7 shell detachable box magazine (KS-23K)
- Sights: Front blade, rear notch.

The KS-23 (Russian: Карабин Специальный-23, romanized: Karabin Spetsialniy-23, lit. 'Special Carbine-23') is a pump action shotgun manufactured by Russian company Tula Arms Plant. The KS-23 was developed by TsNIITochMash in the Soviet Union for use by the Ministry of Internal Affairs. It is officially designated as a carbine in Russia because it uses a rifled barrel.

The KS-23 is renowned for its large caliber, firing a 23 mm shotgun shell, equating to 6.278 gauge using the British and American standards of shotgun gauges and approximately 4 gauge using the current European standards (based on the metric CIP tables), making it the largest-bore shotgun in modern use.

== History ==
The KS-23 was designed in the 1970s by TsNIITochMash, a key weapons developer in the Soviet Union, as a shotgun for the Ministry of Internal Affairs (MVD) with the purpose of suppressing prison riots. The design implemented barrels produced for the Gryazev-Shipunov GSh-23, an autocannon that fires 23×115mm rounds fitted to Soviet military aircraft. These GSh-23 barrels were rejected by quality control due to manufacturing flaws, but were deemed to be acceptable for the lower stress of firing slugs and less-lethal rounds. These barrels were then cut down in length for the KS-23, reducing production costs, and a 23x75mm shell was developed. As a result of reusing GSh-23 barrels, the KS-23 has the unique features of being a shotgun with a rifled barrel.

The KS-23 began to see use during the mid-1980s by several MVD forces, including the Militsiya and the Internal Troops. During the 1990s, research was made into improving the original design to make it usable in confined indoor areas. Two prototypes were proposed, the KS-23M and KS-23K, although only the M version saw use.

== Ammunition ==
The KS-23 was created with the capability to fire several different types of ammunition, listed below:

- "Shrapnel-10" («Шрапнель-10»): buckshot round with 10-meter effective range
- "Shrapnel-25" («Шрапнель-25»): buckshot round with 25-meter effective range
- "Barrikada" («Баррикада», "Barricade"): cartridge with solid steel projectile able to destroy the engine block of a car at up to 100 meters
- "Volna" («Волна», "Wave"): inert version of cartridge used for education and practice during training
- "Volna-R" («Волна-Р», "Wave"): cartridge with less-lethal rubber bullet
- "Strela-3" («Стрела-3», "Arrow"): cartridge with less-lethal plastic bullet
- "Cheremukha-7" («Черёмуха-7», "Bird Cherry"-7): tear gas grenade with CN agent
- "Siren-7" («Сирень-7», "Lilac"): tear gas grenade with CS agent
- "Zvezda" («Звезда», "Star"): flash-bang round
- PV-23 (ПВ-23): blank (grenade launching) cartridge

Later, two add-on muzzle mortars were produced, the 36 mm Nasadka-6 and 82 mm Nasadka-12, bringing with them several new ammunition types:

- Blank grenade launching cartridge to be used with muzzle mortars
- 36 mm "Cheremukha-6" tear gas grenade
- 82 mm "Cheremukha-12" "high-efficiency" tear gas grenade for use on open areas

== Variants ==
=== KS-23 ===
The original KS-23 was developed jointly by NIISpetstekhniki (MVD) and TsNIITochMash in 1971 and was accepted for use by Soviet police in 1985. The gun has a barrel length of 510 mm and an overall length of 1040 mm with a fixed wooden stock. The KS-23 has an underbarrel tubular magazine capable of holding three rounds, with one in the chamber, giving the gun a maximum round capacity of four. The gun's effective range is 150 m.

=== KS-23-1 ===
It is a short-barreled version of the KS-23 made to address the issues with use in close ranges where the original would be unwieldy due to its length. The barrel length, total length, and effective range of this model are currently unknown but likely close to or identical that of the KS-23M due to similar sizing.

=== KS-23M ===
The KS-23M Drozd (Carbine, Special, 23 mm, modernized Drozd "Thrush") was developed on the base of the KS-23. Development for it was started in October 1990. Twenty-five carbines were submitted for testing on December 10, 1991, after which the winner, then designated S-3, became the KS-23M "Drozd" and was accepted for use by police and the Internal Troops of Russia. The KS-23M includes a detachable wire buttstock and shortened barrel, as opposed to the fixed wooden stock on standard KS-23s. The gun is chambered in 23 mm, like the original. It's overall length with the buttstock is 875 mm, without 650 mm, and the barrel is 410 mm long. The gun's effective range is 150 m.

=== KS-23K ===
The KS-23K is a redesigned KS-23 that features a bullpup layout. The KS-23K was accepted in 1998 for use by the Russian Ministry of Internal Affairs (MVD). Development and adoption of this carbine was motivated by the fact that in the earlier accepted configurations of the KS-23 and KS-23M, a major noted deficiency was that the tubular magazine did not make it possible to rapidly reload or change the type of ammunition being used. Because of this, a major design change for the KS-23K is that it has an extended box magazine that holds seven shells instead of the three shells seen on other models. The gun has a mechanical safety located on the left side, above the pistol handle and open, non-adjustable sights. The gun's effective range is 100 m.

=== TOZ-123 ===
The civilian version of the KS-23 is the ТОZ-123 Selezen'-4 ("Drake-4") (ТОЗ-123 «Селезень-4»). It is manufactured by Tulsky Oruzheiny Zavod and features a smoothbore barrel design, making it more similar to a traditional shotgun. A large part of its popularity among most media stems from the fact that it is chambered in standard 4 gauge. The first TOZ-123 was made in 1995. It has been legal to purchase and own as a civilian hunting shotgun in Russia since August 1996.

The gun maker's website has this as the description for the shotgun:

The shotgun is multicharged, with a tubular underbarrel magazine of 3-cartridge capacity. Reloading is provided with a removable fore-end. The presence of the special barrel rear projection on the frame combined with the rear sight gives the possibility of mounting an optical sight. The shotgun is intended for amateur hunting with shot cartridges.

The TOZ-123 was banned from import into the United States during the Clinton administration.

== Users ==
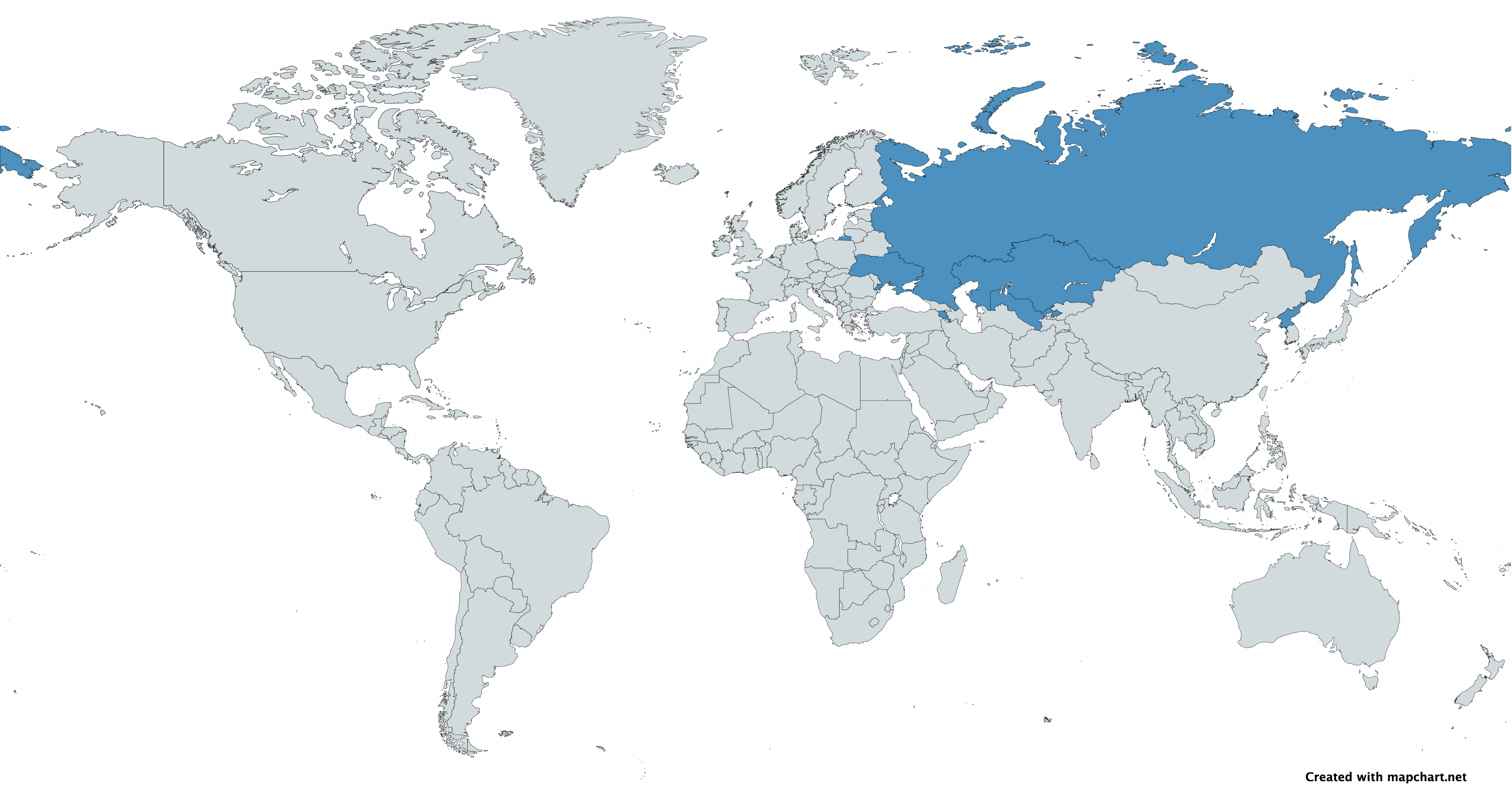
Map with KS-23 users in blue

- Armenia: Used as service firearm by Police
- Kazakhstan: Used by prison guards
- North Korea
- Russia: Used by FSB Border Guard Service
- Soviet Union
- Ukraine
- Uzbekistan: Used by Customs Service

== See also ==
- List of Russian weaponry
- Zlatoust RB-12
- TOZ rifle
- OTs-28
