= P12 =

P12 or P–12 may refer to:

== Aircraft ==
- Boeing P-12, an interwar biplane operated by the United States Navy and Army
- Lippisch P.12, a German aircraft design study

== Transportation ==
- Chery P12, a proposed Chinese pickup truck
- Eastover–Addison Road Line, a bus route in Washington, D.C.
- London Buses route P12
- Nissan Primera (P12), a family car
- P12 road (Zimbabwe)

== Weapons ==
- P-12 (missile), a Chinese ballistic missile
- Grendel P12, a .380 pistol
- FN P-12, a shotgun
- Heckler & Koch P12, a pistol

== Other uses ==
- P–12 (education), a designation for the sum of primary and secondary education in Australia
- P-12 radar, a Soviet 2D VHF radar system
- Papyrus 12, a biblical manuscript
- PKCS #12, a cryptographic standard
- P-12 (mountain lion), a mountain lion that lived in the Santa Monica Mountain National Recreation Area
