= Winchester Model 1887/1901 =

Lever-action shotguns

Winchester Model 1887
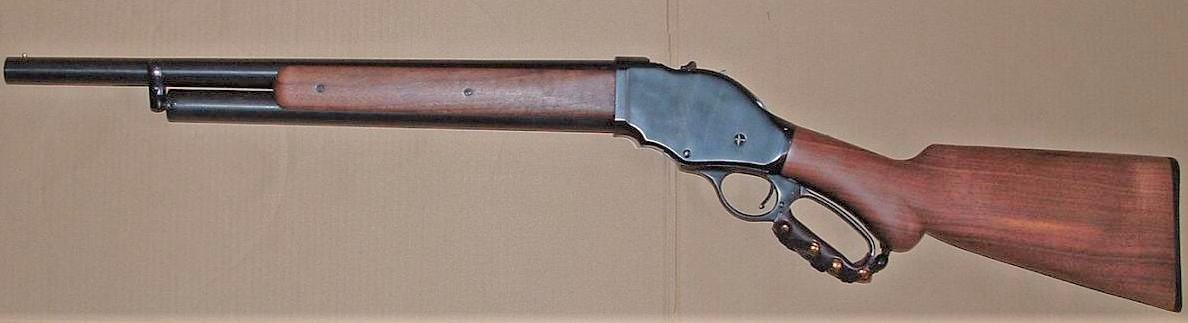
- Reproduction of a Model 1887
- Type: Lever-action shotgun
- Place of origin: United States

Service history
- Used by: Various law enforcement agencies and stagecoach companies

Production history
- Designer: John Browning
- Designed: 1887
- Manufacturer: Winchester Repeating Arms Company
- Produced: 1887–1899; 1901–1920 (Model 1901)
- No. built: 64,855 (Model 1887); 13,500 (Model 1901)
- Variants: M1901

Specifications
- Mass: 8 lbs. (3.6 kg)
- Length: 39¼ in. (997 mm)
- Barrel length: 20 in. (508 mm), 30 in. (762 mm)
- Caliber: 12-gauge, 10-gauge
- Action: Lever-action, rolling block
- Feed system: 5+1 round tubular magazine
- Sights: Iron sights

The Winchester Model 1887 and Winchester Model 1901 are lever-action shotguns designed by American gun designer John Browning and produced by the Winchester Repeating Arms Company during the late 19th and early 20th centuries.

== Overview ==
The Model 1887 was one of the first successful repeating shotguns. Its lever-action design was chosen at the behest of the Winchester Repeating Arms Company, best known at the time as manufacturers of lever-action rifles such as the Winchester Model 1873. Designer John Browning suggested that a pump-action would be much more appropriate for a repeating shotgun, but Winchester management's position was that, at the time, the company was known as a "lever-action firearm company", and felt that their new shotgun must also be a lever-action for reasons of brand recognition. Browning responded by designing a breech-loading, rolling block lever-action. To Winchester's credit, however, they later introduced a Browning-designed pump-action shotgun known as the Model 1893 (an early production version of the Model 1897), after the introduction of smokeless powder.

Shotgun shells at the time used black powder as a propellant, and so the Model 1887 shotgun was designed and chambered for less powerful black powder shotshells. Both 10 and 12-gauge models were offered in the Model 1887; 12-gauge variants used a 2 5/8" shell, 10-gauge variants fired a 2 7/8" shell.

The standard barrel length was 30" with 32" available as a special order. In 1888 a 20" barrelled version could be ordered and Winchester offered the shotguns with Damascus barrels.

=== Model 1901 ===
By 1900 it was soon realized that the action on the M1887 was not strong enough to handle early smokeless powder shotshells, and so a redesign resulted in the stronger Winchester Model 1901, 10-gauge only, to handle the advent of the more powerful smokeless powder. A 12-gauge chambering was not offered, as Winchester did not want the Model 1901 to compete with their successful 12-gauge Model 1897 pump-action shotgun. Other distinguishing characteristics of the Model 1901 are:

- The shotgun was offered with only a 32-inch barrel.
- A two-piece finger lever with a trigger block to prevent accidental discharge.
- The Winchester trademark stamp was moved to the upper tang, behind the hammer.
- The choke type was stamped on the left side of the barrel near the receiver.

Although a technically sound gun design, the market for lever-action shotguns waned considerably, as John Browning had predicted, after the introduction of the Winchester 1897 and other contemporary pump-action shotguns. Model 1887 production totaled 64,855 units between 1887 and 1901. Between 1901 and 1920, an additional 13,500 Model 1901 shotguns were manufactured before the Model 1887/1901 product line was discontinued.

== Reproduction ==
A number of gun companies have tried to produce Model 1887/1901 shotguns that could chamber modern, smokeless shotgun shells—largely for the cowboy action shooting discipline—but with little commercial success. Three firearm companies have managed to produce viable models for the commercial firearms market by incorporating the easier-to-produce Model 1901 action into the chassis of the Model 1887:

- ADI Limited of Australia produced a small trial run of modern Model 1887/1901 shotguns, chambered for modern smokeless 12-gauge shotshells. The Australian National Firearms Agreement regulates lever action shotguns as Category A/B guns, while pump shotguns fall under the more tightly regulated Category C/D. Commercial production on this firearm by ADI was anticipated for 2007, following several years of delays due to distribution issues, but this has not yet happened.
- Chinese arms manufacturer Norinco currently produces the Model 1887 shotgun chambered for modern smokeless 12-gauge shells, a version of which (featuring a 20" barrel) is manufactured for the American firearms firm Interstate Arms Corporation (IAC) and exported for sale in the United States, Canada, and Australia. As the only legal repeating shotgun (besides Mossberg bolt-action shotguns) for non-Primary Producer firearms owners in Australia, it has proven very popular with hunters and sporting shooters alike. U.S. and Canadian sales, however, have been largely focused on cowboy action shooting participants, owing to the ready availability of affordable pump-action and semi-automatic shotguns in most parts of the U.S. and Canada. This particular firearm has become popular with regular American and Canadian firearm owners.
- The Italian firm Chiappa Firearms manufactures modern reproductions of the Winchester Model 1887 series shotguns. The shotguns appeared on the Australian and the European firearms markets in late 2008. Chiappa's replicas are offered with barrels ranging from 28 to 18.5 inches. They also offer a model with a rifled barrel and two models with pistol grips.

== Bibliography ==
- Madis, George (1977). The Winchester Book. Dallas: Taylor Publishing. OCLC 138931.
