= FN P-12 =

P-12
- Type: Shotgun
- Place of origin: Belgium

Production history
- Designed: 2012
- Manufacturer: FN Herstal

Specifications
- Mass: 7.4 lb (3.4 kg)
- Length: 39 in (99 cm)
- Barrel length: 18 in (46 cm)
- Width: 28 in (71 cm)
- Cartridge: 12-gauge (2.75" and 3")
- Action: Pump-action
- Feed system: Internal tube magazine; capacities: 5+1 (2.75" shells); 4+1 (3" shells)
- Sights: Flip-up rear, fiber-optic front

The FN P-12 shotgun is a pump-action 12-gauge shotgun designed and manufactured by FN Herstal assembled in Portugal.

== History ==
The weapon, which was introduced during the summer of 2012, is intended to complement the FN SLP. The P-12 has since been discontinued by FN.

== Design ==
The P-12 has a receiver constructed from aircraft-grade aluminum and the matte-black synthetic stock features a non-slip recoil pad fit with steel sling swivel studs.

The P-12 has a Weaver accessory rail and comes standard with a flip-up rear sight and a fiber-optic front sight which provide a 14 in (36 cm) sight radius. It also features a trigger pull of 6.2 to 7.3 lbs.
