= Valtro PM-5 =

- Type: Pump-action shotgun
- Place of origin: Italy

Production history
- Designer: Valtro
- Designed: 1980s
- Manufacturer: Valtro
- Produced: 1980s-present

Specifications
- Barrel length: 355 mm 508 mm
- Cartridge: 12 gauge
- Action: Pump-action
- Feed system: 7+1 round box magazine

The Valtro PM-5 is a 12 gauge Italian pump-action shotgun developed and manufactured by Valtro. The PM-5 has a removable magazine, and it is available with either a fixed or a folding stock.

== Variants ==
- Valtro PM-5
- Valtro PM-5-350

== Users ==
- France: French Navy
- Guatemala: Used by Kaibiles and police forces.
