= Smith & Wesson Model 3000 =

- Type: Pump-action shotgun
- Place of origin: Japan

Production history
- Manufacturer: Howa Machinery
- Produced: 1979–1986

Specifications
- Cartridge: 12 and 20 gauge
- Barrels: 28 or 30 in (71 or 76 cm) (12 ga.); 26 or 28 in (66 or 71 cm) (20 ga.); 18 or 20 in (46 or 51 cm) (slug gun)
- Action: Pump action
- Feed system: Tube magazine (4-round)
- Sights: Bead; optional open sights on slug gun

The Smith & Wesson Model 3000 is a pump-action shotgun offered by Smith & Wesson during the 1970s and 1980s. The shotguns were manufactured in Japan by Howa Machinery.

== History ==
The Model 3000 was available in 12 and 20 gauge, chambering 2 3/4 or 3 in (70 or 76 mm) shotshells. A "slug gun" variant chambered for 2 3/4-inch shells with a magazine extension and a shorter barrel was offered in 12 gauge only, with optional open sights.

Sportsman and tactical versions were produced; the tactical versions were used by some American police departments. Like the semi-automatic Model 1000 that was offered during the same era, the Model 3000 was sold for a short time by Mossberg after it was discontinued by Smith & Wesson.
