= Bandayevsky RB-12 =

RB-12
- Type: Shotgun
- Place of origin: Russia

Production history
- Designer: Aleksandr Bandayevsky
- Designed: 1995

Specifications
- Mass: 3 kg
- Length: 825 mm 610 mm (stock folded)
- Barrel length: 525 mm
- Cartridge: 12 Gauge
- Barrels: 1
- Action: Slide action, moving barrel with fixed bolt
- Feed system: 6 round detachable box magazine
- Sights: Iron

The Bandayevsky RB-12 (Cyrillic: Ружьё Бандаевского РБ-12 – Ruzh'yo Bandayevskogo RB-12) is a shotgun of Russian origin. The weapon is a slide-action (pumped forward) shotgun and comes with a folding stock. The gun is designed by Aleksandr Bandayevsky, chief designer and president of JSC Uralmashproekt.

== See also ==
- List of Russian weaponry
- List of shotguns
- RMB-93
