= RMB-93 =

Russian pump action shotgun

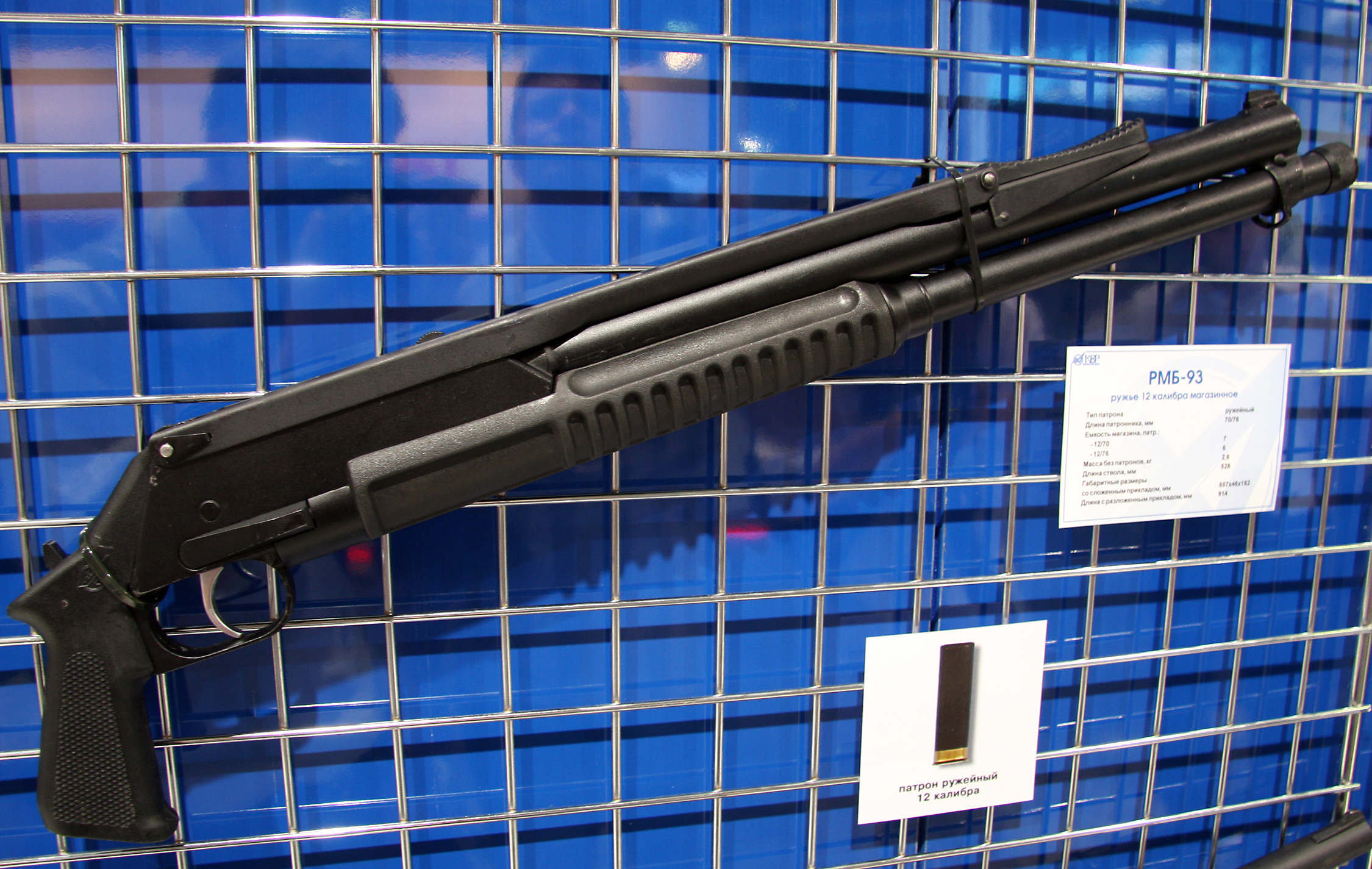
- Type: Shotgun
- Place of origin: Russia

Production history
- Designer: TsKIB SOO (Central Bureau for Hunting and Sporting Arms, now a division of KBP)
- Designed: Early 1990s
- Manufacturer: KBP Instrument Design Bureau
- Produced: 1993–2007
- Variants: Several sporting and hunting variants

Specifications
- Mass: 2.5 kg (5.5 lb)
- Length: Stock extended: 920 mm (36 in); Stock folded: 671 mm (26.4 in)
- Caliber: 12-gauge
- Action: Double action only pump-action
- Rate of fire: 12 rpm
- Muzzle velocity: 340 m/s (1,100 ft/s)
- Feed system: 8-round overbarrel tubular magazine

The RMb-93 is a pump-action shotgun designed and manufactured by the KBP Instrument Design Bureau of Tula, Russia. It is the baseline model of the Rys ("Lynx") series of shotguns, taking the model name of Rys-K. The RMb-93 has been conceived as a combat weapon for Special Forces and Police units that might face Close Quarters Battle situations. The weapon was engineered to reduce the size as much as possible.

== Description ==
The working system of the RMb-93 is itself an odd slide-action operation called "Inverted Cycle", similar in concept to the one used in the South-African Truvelo Armoury Neostead shotgun (the only other mass-produced firearm to be based upon this system). The magazine tube is placed over the barrel rather than under it, and is accessed through a flip-up cover on the top of the receiver. Once the weapon is loaded, a shell is chambered by pushing the slide forward-then-backward, instead of the standard backward-then-forward motion of the forend found on most pump-action weapons. Having the RMb-93 a fixed breech face and movable barrel, the operation moves the entire barrel assembly. Once a round is fired and another is chambered, the empty shell falls downwards to the ground, pushed by its own weight. The design of the RMb-93 "Rys-K" carries several advantages: the ejection system makes the gun fully ambidextrous, and the magazine located over the barrel gives the shotgun a low center of mass and reduces upward recoil. The main drawback of the overall design stands in the fact that the weapon has a pistol grip with an top folding metal stock, which blocks access to the loading port in the folded position. The RMb-93 thus can not be reloaded without extending or removing the stock, a disadvantage if it is being used tactically with a folded stock.

== Variants and commercial availability ==
The RMB-93 "Rys-K" shotgun is commercially available to civilians in Canada, Russia, Italy, and possibly in other Countries. For the civilian distribution in Russia and Canada, the shotgun is provided with a stock disconnector that prevents it from firing if the stock is not extended, so to comply with local laws and regulation about the minimum legal overall length for civilian firearms.

Additionally, KBP manufactures several variants of the "Rys" shotgun series for the civilian distribution. The RMK-93 "Rys-K" itself is manufactured with Phosphatized finish to resist salt corrosion (for use in maritime environments), plus equipped with the above-mentioned stock disconnector. The RMO-93 "Rys" is a purely sporting variant with wooden thumbhole stock and either wooden or synthetic slide-forend; very similar to it is the "Rys-OT" variant has a longer barrel, with either a synthetic or wooden sliding-forend, and standard wooden shotgun stock.

The RMF-93 "Rys-F" shotgun is a longer-barreled variant of the RMb-93 "Rys-K", can shoot with folded stock.

RMO-93 Rys (Ruzhye Magazinnoe Okhotnichje or Magazinr-fed hunting shotgun, model 1993) - the civilian version of RMB-93. Available in the following versions:

- Rys-F: has an overall length of 809 mm (31.9 in) and a 680 mm (27 in) barrel, with a folding butt up and forward (in RMB-93).
- Rys-O: has an overall length of 1,080 mm (43 in) and a 680 mm (27 in) barrel, with a wooden buttstock.
  - Rys-OC: has an overall length of 1,080 mm (43 in) and a 680 mm (27 in) barrel chambered for 12/76.
- Rys-K: has a forward folding buttstock and a barrel shortened to 528 mm (20.8 in) (in this version, the RMS-93 is similar to RMB-93, but it has an auto-lock trigger mechanism that engages when the buttstock is in the folded position).
- Rys-U: has an overall length of 918 mm (36.1 in) and a 528 mm (20.8 in) barrel, with a wooden thumbhole buttstock.
- Rys-CA: has an overall length of 924 mm (36.4 in) and a 534 mm (21.0 in) barrel, chambered for 12/76.
- Rys-L: has an overall length of 928 mm (36.5 in) and a 528 mm (20.8 in) barrel, with a wooden buttstock.
  - Rys-LC: has an overall length of 934 mm (36.8 in) and a 534 mm (21.0 in) barrel, chambered for 12/76.

== Users ==
- Belarus - RMF-93 "Rys-F" is allowed as civilian hunting weapon
- Moldova - RMF-93 "Rys-F", RMO-93-2 "Rys-K" and RM-96 "Rys-U" are allowed as civilian hunting weapon
- Russia - RMB-93 was acquired in limited numbers by Russian law enforcement. RMO-93 and RMF-93 "Rys-F" are allowed as civilian hunting weapon since August 1996. Also, they were used in private security companies until 1 March 2006

== See also ==
- List of Russian weaponry

== Sources ==
- Cutshaw, Charlie (1998). The New World of Russian Small Arms & Ammo. Boulder, CO: Paladin Press. ISBN 0-87364-993-1.
