= Garland County Courthouse =

- U.S. National Register of Historic Places
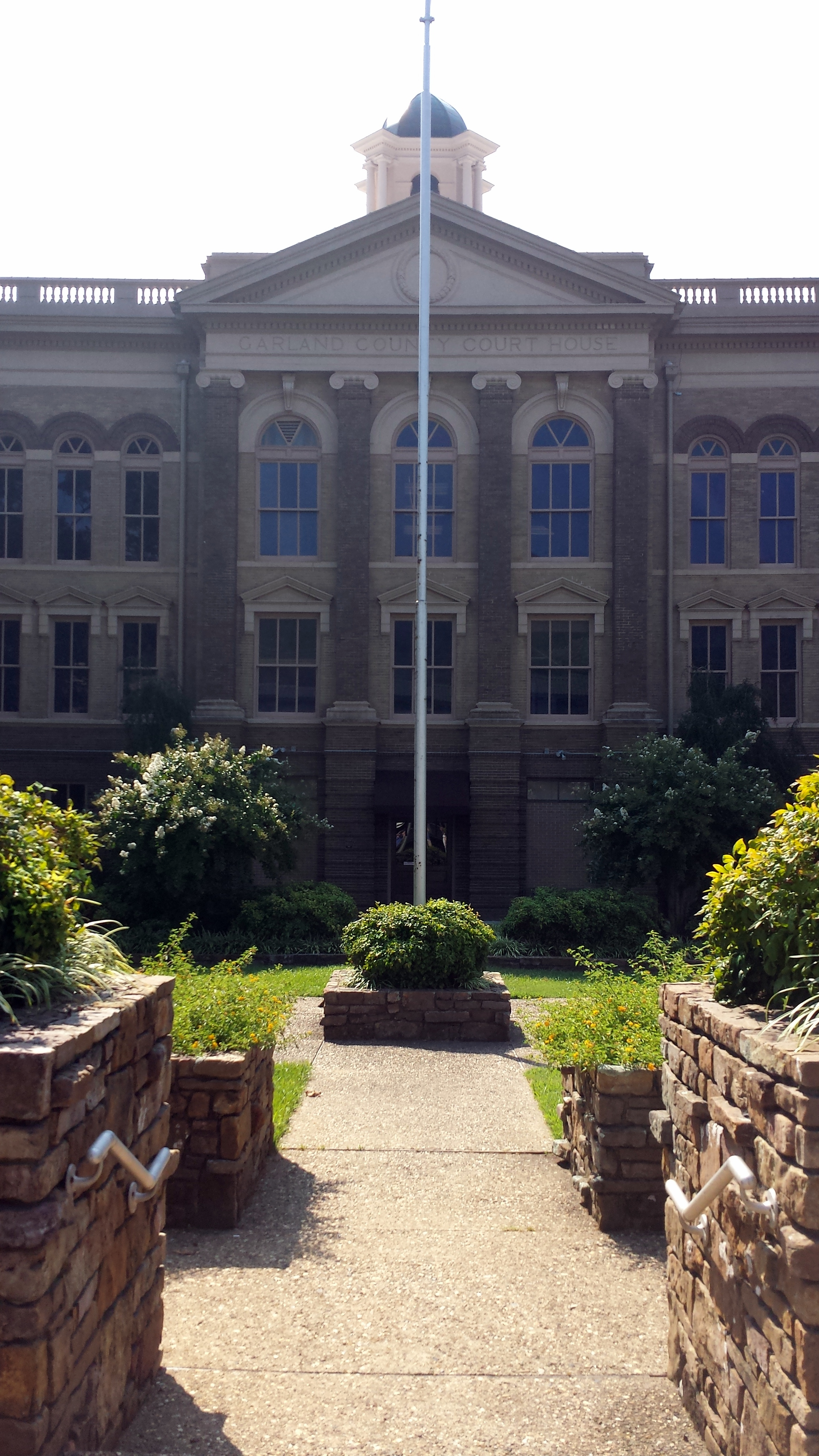

- Location within Arkansas Location within the United States
- Location: Ouachita and Hawthorne Aves, Hot Springs, Arkansas
- Coordinates: 34°30′17″N 93°3′32″W
- Area: less than one acre
- Built: 1905
- Architectural style: Classical Revival
- NRHP reference No.: 79000441
- Added to NRHP: December 6, 1979

The Garland County Courthouse is located at the corner of Ouachita and Hawthorne Streets in Hot Springs, the county seat of Garland County, Arkansas. It is a rectangular four-story brick structure with Classical Revival styling. It has projecting entry sections on the north and south sides, with stylistically sympathetic additions to the south and west. It was built in 1905, gutted by a major fire in 1913, after which its interior was rebuilt. In a statewide survey of county courthouses conducted in 1979, it was judged to be one of the state's most architecturally significant courthouse buildings.

The courthouse was listed on the National Register of Historic Places in 1979.

== See also ==
- National Register of Historic Places listings in Garland County, Arkansas
