= TOZ-194 =

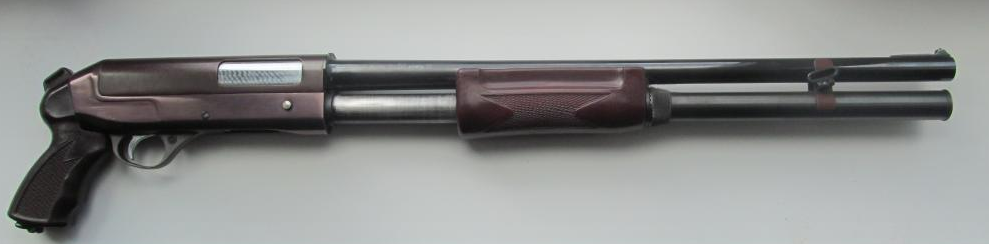
- Type: Pump-action Shotgun
- Place of origin: Russia

Production history
- Designer: TsNIITochMash
- Designed: early 1990s
- Manufacturer: Tula Arms Plant
- Produced: since 1994 (TOZ-94)
- Variants: TOZ-194, TOZ-194-01M, TOZ-194-02M, TOZ-194-03M

Specifications
- Mass: 2.9 kg (TOZ-194, TOZ-194-01M), 3.2 kg (TOZ-194-02M, TOZ-194-03M)
- Barrel length: 540mm
- Cartridge: 12 gauge
- Action: pump
- Feed system: 7 round internal tubular magazine
- Sights: Bead

The TOZ-194 is a 12 gauge, pump-action shotgun manufactured by the Tula Arms Plant.

== History ==
In the early 90's, the Tula Arms Plant designed a pump-action shotgun based on TOZ-87. In late 1994, the first model (TOZ-94) was developed.

Later, the production of second model (TOZ-194) began, and since then it has gained popularity with civilian shooters in Russia and in Europe, and is reported to be in use with some Russian Security forces.

The TOZ-194 is a conventional pump-action shotgun that feeds from a 7-rounds tube and chambers 70 mm shotgun shells ("Standard" 2 3/4" 12-gauge, therefore the use of 76 mm (3 inches) "Magnum" shells is strongly counter-indicated). Its main feature is its 540 mm (21.2 inches approx.) barrel, which is oddly long for a combat shotgun; this was done to reach an overall length of 805 mm (31.6 inches approx.) which makes it legal for civilian ownership in Russia.

== Variants ==
- TOZ-94 (ТОЗ-94) - first model with four round magazine
- TOZ-194 (ТОЗ-194) - second model. Four variants of the TOZ-194 shotgun are available: the TOZ-194M with sole pistol grip; the TOZ-194-01M with pistol grip and upfolding metal stock, and muzzle adapters available for tactical applications; the TOZ-194-02M and TOZ-194-03M, both with standard fixed stock, the latter one also available with muzzle adapter.

Variant	Gauge, mm	Barrel Length, mm	Shotgun length, mm	with folded stock	Mass, kg	Magazine capacity
TOZ-194M	12/70	540	805	N/A	3.0	
TOZ-194-01M	12/70	540	1250	N/A	3.0	4; 7
TOZ-194-02M	12/70	540	1060	815	3.2	7
TOZ-194-03M	12/70	540	1060	815	3.2	4;7

== Users ==
- Moldova - TOZ-94 and TOZ-194-02 shotguns (with non-detachable fixed shoulder stocks) are allowed as civilian hunting weapon
- Russian Federation - is allowed as civilian hunting weapon
