= Pindad SG1 =

12-gauge shotgun produced by Pindad

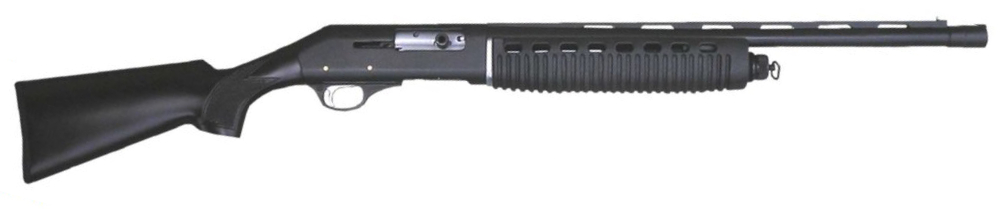
- Pindad SG-1 12 Gauge
- Type: Combat shotgun
- Place of origin: Indonesia

Service history
- In service: 2005 - Present
- Used by: See Users

Production history
- Designer: Pindad
- Manufacturer: Pindad
- Produced: 2005–present

Specifications
- Mass: 2,850 grams (net weight)
- Cartridge: 12-gauge
- Barrels: 560 mm
- Action: Gas operated
- Effective firing range: 100 m
- Feed system: 5-rounds magazine
- Sights: Iron sights

The Pindad SG1 (Indonesian: Senapan Gentel 1/Senapan Gotri 1; lit. 'Shotgun 1') is a 12-gauge shotgun produced by Pindad.

== Description ==
The SG1 has a net weight of 2,850 grams and a capacity of 5 rounds. This shotgun works with a gas operated mechanism.

The main target users of the SG1 shotgun are law enforcers, including prison officers throughout the Ministry of Law and Human Rights.

== Users ==
- Indonesia
  - Indonesian National Police
