= FN SLP =

SLP
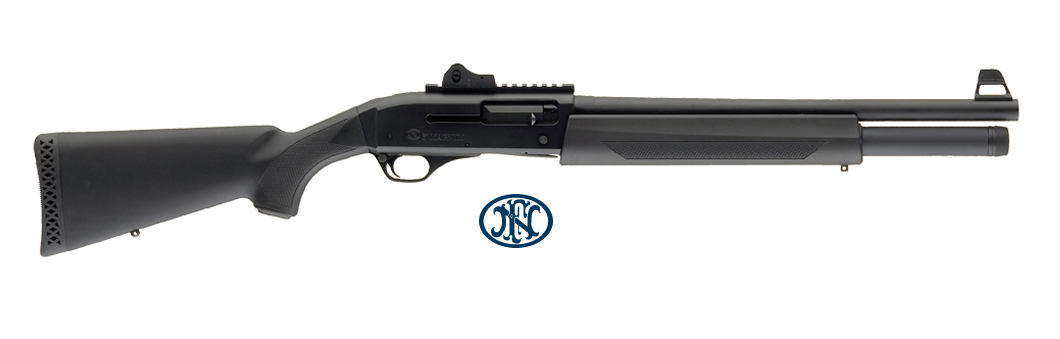
- Type: Shotgun
- Place of origin: Belgium

Production history
- Manufacturer: FN Herstal
- Unit cost: US$1,000
- Produced: 2008–present
- Variants: SLP Standard; SLP Mark I; SLP Tactical; SLP Mark I Tactical

Specifications
- Mass: Empty: 3.37 kg (7.4 lb) (Standard); 3.74 kg (8.2 lb) (Mark I); 3.49 kg (7.7 lb) (Tactical); 3.85 kg (8.5 lb) (Mark I Tactical)
- Length: 99.1 cm (39.0 in) (Standard); 109.2 cm (43.0 in) (Mark I)
- Barrel length: 457 mm (18.0 in) (Standard); 559 mm (22.0 in) (Mark I)
- Width: 61 mm (2.4 in)
- Height: 201 mm (7.9 in)
- Cartridge: 12-gauge (2.75" and 3")
- Action: Gas-operated
- Rate of fire: Semi-automatic
- Feed system: Internal tube magazine; capacities: 6+1 or 5+1 (Standard with 2.75" or 3" shells); 8+1 or 7+1 (Mark I with 2.75" or 3" shells)
- Sights: Iron sights with MIL-STD-1913 (Picatinny) accessory rail

The FN SLP (Self-Loading Police) shotgun is a semi-automatic 12-gauge shotgun designed and manufactured by FN Herstal in Belgium. The SLP shotgun is gas-operated, and FN currently produces it in five different models: SLP Standard, SLP Mark I, SLP Tactical, “SLP Competition” and SLP Mark I Tactical. The SLP series was introduced in 2008, and was named "2009 Shotgun of the Year" by American Rifleman magazine.

The SLP has a MIL-STD-1913 (Picatinny) accessory rail and is provided with adjustable iron sights; the SLP Standard has a sight radius of 447 or 546 mm (17.6 or 21.5 in), while the Mark I has a sight radius of 457 mm (18.0 in). SLP shotguns have a trigger pull of 28 to 33 N (6.2 to 7.3 lb_{F}). The SLP's carrier release button is located on the side of the shotgun beneath the ejection port. The shotgun's safety is located behind its trigger. FN claims that the SLP is “capable of firing eight rounds in less than one second”.

SLP shotguns are shipped with a locking device and keys, a Standard Invector improved cylinder and modified choke tubes, a choke tube wrench, two active valve pistons (one for heavy loads and one for light loads), three interchangeable cheekpieces (with Tactical model only), three interchangeable recoil pads (with Tactical model only), and an owner's manual.
