= QBS-09 =

- Type: Semi-automatic shotgun
- Place of origin: China

Service history
- In service: 2009—present

Production history
- Designer: Norinco
- Designed: 2005
- Manufacturer: Norinco
- Produced: 2005-present

Specifications
- Mass: 3.45 kg (7.6 lb)
- Length: 710 mm (28.0 in)—895 mm (35.2 in)
- Barrel length: 382 mm (15.0 in)
- Cartridge: DBD-09 18.4mm tungsten buckshot
- Action: Gas operated rotating bolt
- Muzzle velocity: 420 m/s (1,400 ft/s)
- Effective firing range: 100 m (330 ft)
- Feed system: 5 round internal tube magazine
- Sights: Bead Front

The QBS-09 semi-automatic shotgun, also known as the Type 09 shotgun, is a semi-automatic shotgun developed by Norinco of the People's Republic of China.

== Development ==
The initial development of the QBS-09 dates back to 1989, with the project officially established in 2005. Multiple prototypes were created between 2005 and 2007, including one featuring an internal tube design and a conventional magazine-fed design.

== Design ==
The QBS-09 is a gas-operated, rotating bolt shotgun. The adjustable gas block provides three-position adjustments for off, normal, and adverse environments. The magazine spring and carrier are of conventional pump-action design, but the weapon features a bolt hold-open function, with the bolt release button located on the right side above the loading port.

The QBS-09 uses specifically designed DBD-09 18.4mm tungsten alloy anti-personnel buckshot. The round is loaded with 14 pellets of high-density tungsten alloy buckshot set into a plastic container with a steel case. Tungsten alloy is used because the penetration level of the lead pellets was unable to meet the PLA requirement. Each pellet is made of a tungsten alloy ball of 5.3mm (~0.2“) in diameter, 1.4 grams (~22 grains) in weight. The length of the round is 65mm, and the whole round weighs 44 grams. The muzzle velocity is reported at 420 m/s (1380 fps), with an effective range of up to 100 meters.

The Type 10 rubber round is also available as a less-lethal option. The Type 10 round weighs 33.96～39.66g, containing 28 rubber pellets with a diameter of 7.2mm. The Type 10 paintball gun is also available for law enforcement usage.

== Users ==
- China
  - People's Liberation Army
  - People's Armed Police
