= Marlin Model 55 =

- Type: Shotgun
- Place of origin: United States

Production history
- Manufacturer: Marlin Firearms Company
- Produced: 1954–1996
- Variants: See Variants

Specifications
- Mass: 8 pounds
- Length: 56¾"
- Barrel length: 36"
- Cartridge: 20, 16, 12 and 10 Gauge
- Action: Bolt action
- Feed system: Detachable 2-round box magazine
- Sights: Brass bead front, rear U-grove notch

The Marlin Model 55 is a large, bolt-action, series of shotguns. It was produced in 20, 16, 12 and 10 gauge at various times in its production history. It features a full-choke and a thumb safety. The shotgun shells are fed via a two-round, detachable, box magazine.

== Variants ==
- Model 55 Hunter: The original model, the Model 55 Hunter, was produced from 1954 until 1964 in 12 gauge (1956-1964 in 20 gauge and 1961–1966 in 16 gauge).
- Model 55 Goose Gun: The Goose Gun was a 12 gauge that was produced from 1962 until 1988 and it featured a 36" barrel with an overall length of 56¾" and weighed 8 lbs.
- Model 55 Swamp Gun: The Swamp Gun was a 12 gauge that was only produced from 1963 to 1965.
- Model 55G (Glenfield): The Model 55G (Glenfield) was produced between 1961 and 1965 in 12, 16 and 20 gauges.
- Glenfield Model 50: From 1966 until 1973, a slightly shorter variant called the Model 50 was produced. It differs in that it features a modified-choke, a 28 inch barrel (48¾" overall), and weighs 7½ pounds.
- Model 55 Slug Gun: The Model 55 Slug Gun was a 12 gauge produced from 1973 until 1979.
- Model 5510 SuperGoose: Another variant called the Model 5510 SuperGoose was produced and chambered for the 10-gauge (3½") cartridge. The SuperGoose was produced from 1976 to 1985.
