= Truvelo Armoury =

South African firearms manufacturer

Truvelo Armoury is a South African firearms manufacturer. It is a division of Truvelo Specialised Manufacturing (Pty) Ltd. Based in Midrand (City of Johannesburg Metropolitan Municipality) the company produces a range of rifles and other small arms for military, law enforcement and civilian users.

== Products ==
- Anti-material rifles
- Sniper rifles
- Assault rifles
- Rifle accessories
- Hunting rifles
- Rifle actions and barrels
- Submachine guns

=== Sniper rifles ===
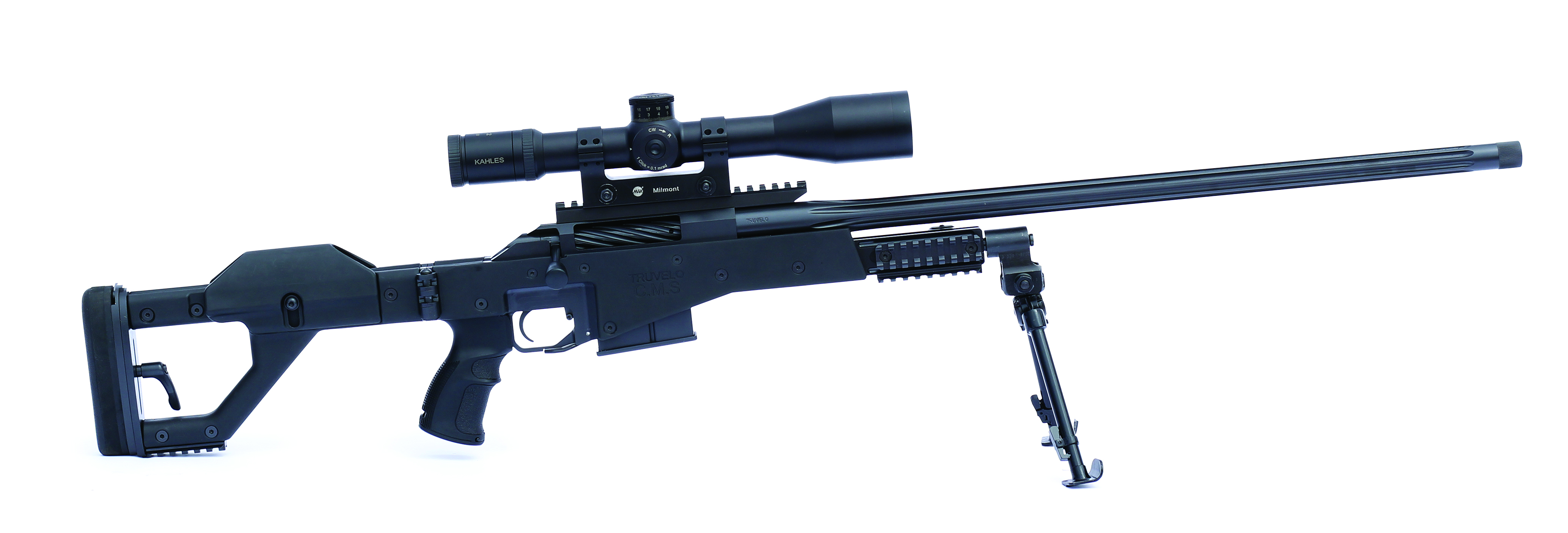
Truvelo 7.62×51 mm CMS rifle

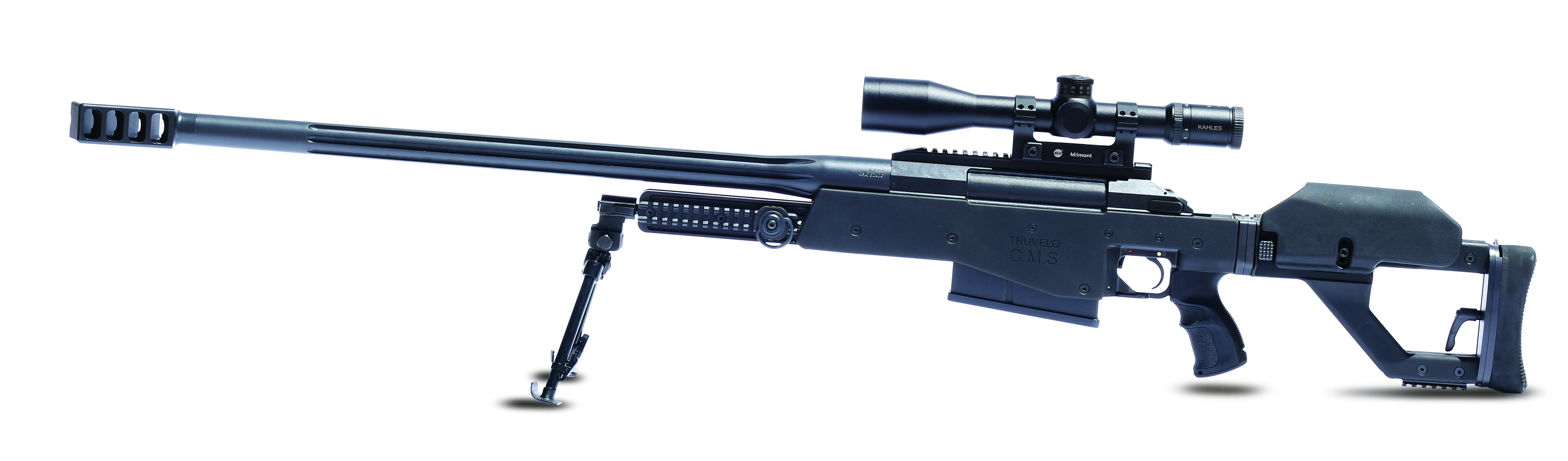
Truvelo 12.7×99 mm CMS rifle

Truvelo sniper rifles are a family of bolt-action sniper rifles and anti-materiel rifles manufactured in South Africa in calibers ranging from 7.62×51mm NATO to 20×110mm. Models include:

Sniper rifles

- 7.62×51mm NATO
- .338 Lapua Magnum

Anti-materiel rifles

- 12.7×99mm NATO
- 14.5×114mm
- 20×42mm
- 20×82mm
- 20×110mm

=== Shotgun ===
- NeoStead NS2000

== Libyan civil war controversy ==
Discovery of Truvelo sniper rifles in Libya during the 2011 Libyan civil war caused considerable controversy, in parliament and in the press with various government officials making contradictory statements about the matter. The international NGO, Human Rights Watch discovered documents proving the sale in Tripoli; 120 CMS 7.62×51 rifles were delivered in late 2010
