= NeoStead 2000 =

NS2000
- Type: Bullpup combat shotgun
- Place of origin: South Africa

Production history
- Designer: Anthony S. Neophytou and Heyns W. Stead
- Designed: 1992
- Manufacturer: Truvelo Armoury
- Produced: 2001–present

Specifications
- Mass: 3.9 kg (8.6 lb)
- Length: 686 mm (27.0 in)
- Barrel length: 572 mm (22.5 in)
- Cartridge: 12 gauge
- Action: Pump-action
- Feed system: 12-round Overhead dual tubular magazine (6 rounds per tubular magazine) or 10-round Overhead dual tubular magazine (5 rounds per tubular magazine)
- Sights: Iron sights

The NeoStead 2000 (NS2000) is a bullpup combat shotgun developed by Truvelo Armoury of South Africa.

Production of the shotgun began in 2001 and the first models were made available in October of that same year. It is notable due to its unusual forward-and-back pump-action cycling motion.

== Design and production ==
The NS2000 is a 12-gauge pump-action shotgun weighing just under 4 kg (8.8 lb), designed primarily for security and civil disturbance situations.

The firearm includes a 570 mm (22 in) barrel despite the overall weapon length of just 690 mm (27 in). The short length makes the weapon easier to handle in close-quarters situations; however it can still remain accurate at relatively long ranges. The long barrel length is achieved by using a bullpup configuration, with a rear-fed tubular magazine.

Another aspect of the NS2000 is its dual six-round (6+6) magazine. The selector switch can be set to left, right, or alternating. In riot conditions, for example, less-lethal flexible baton rounds can be used with standard rounds in reserve.

A possible production variant of the NS2000 has a 460 mm (18 in) barrel in a weapon with an overall length of 560 mm (22 in). The shorter barrel length reduces capacity to a dual five-round (5+5) magazine. This makes the weapon easier to import or licence in some countries.

Its pump-action mechanism operates in a forward-and-back motion due to its moving-barrel mechanism, instead of the traditional moving-action of back-and-forward motion. This method of operation is quite rare. Safety is increased by this method, since the pumping hand cannot accidentally slide in front of the shooting barrel.

The NS2000 has been available for civilian purchase since 2003, with the majority of sales in Europe.

== Patent drawings ==
Patent drawings of the NeoStead 2000.

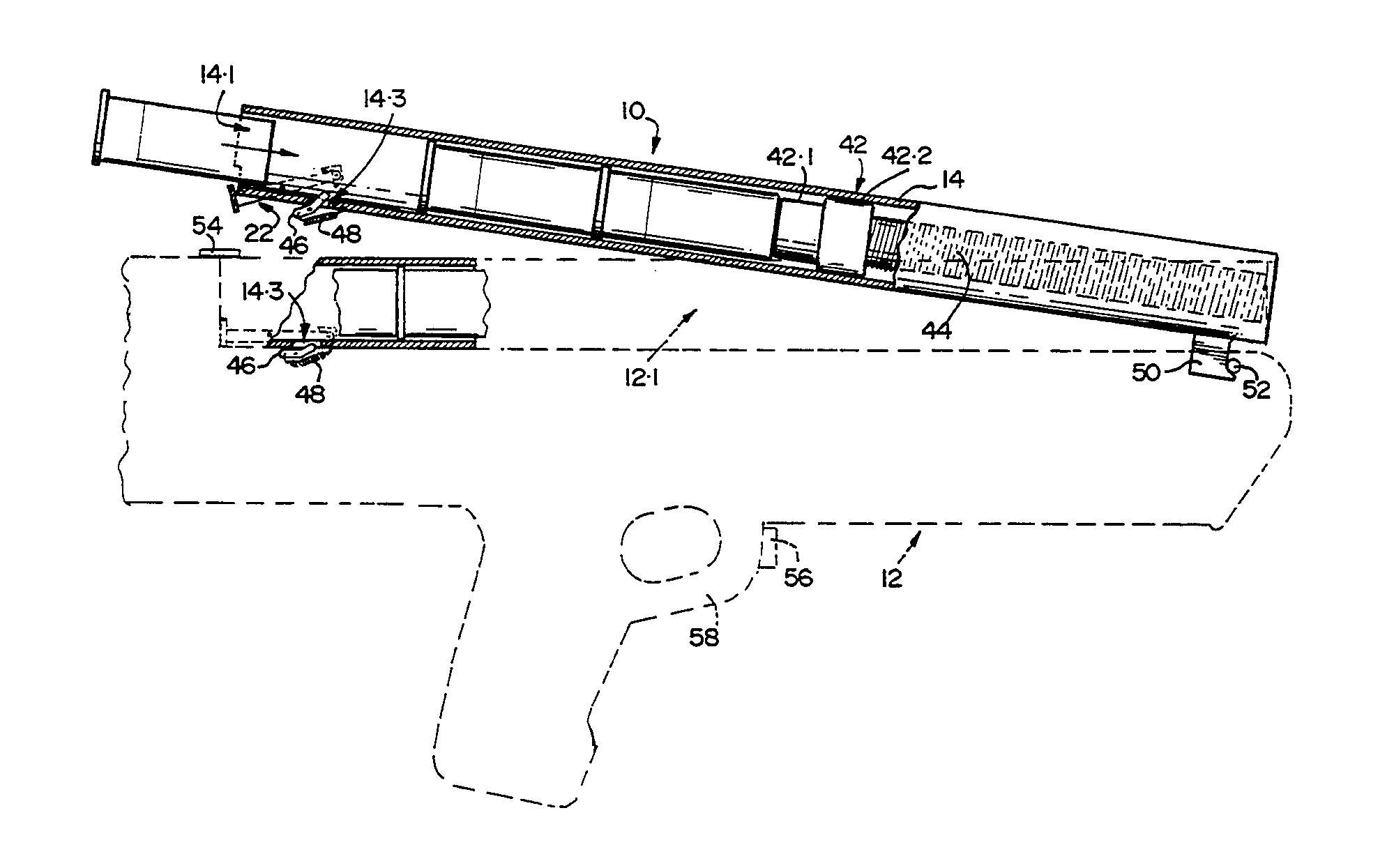
Magazine in loading position

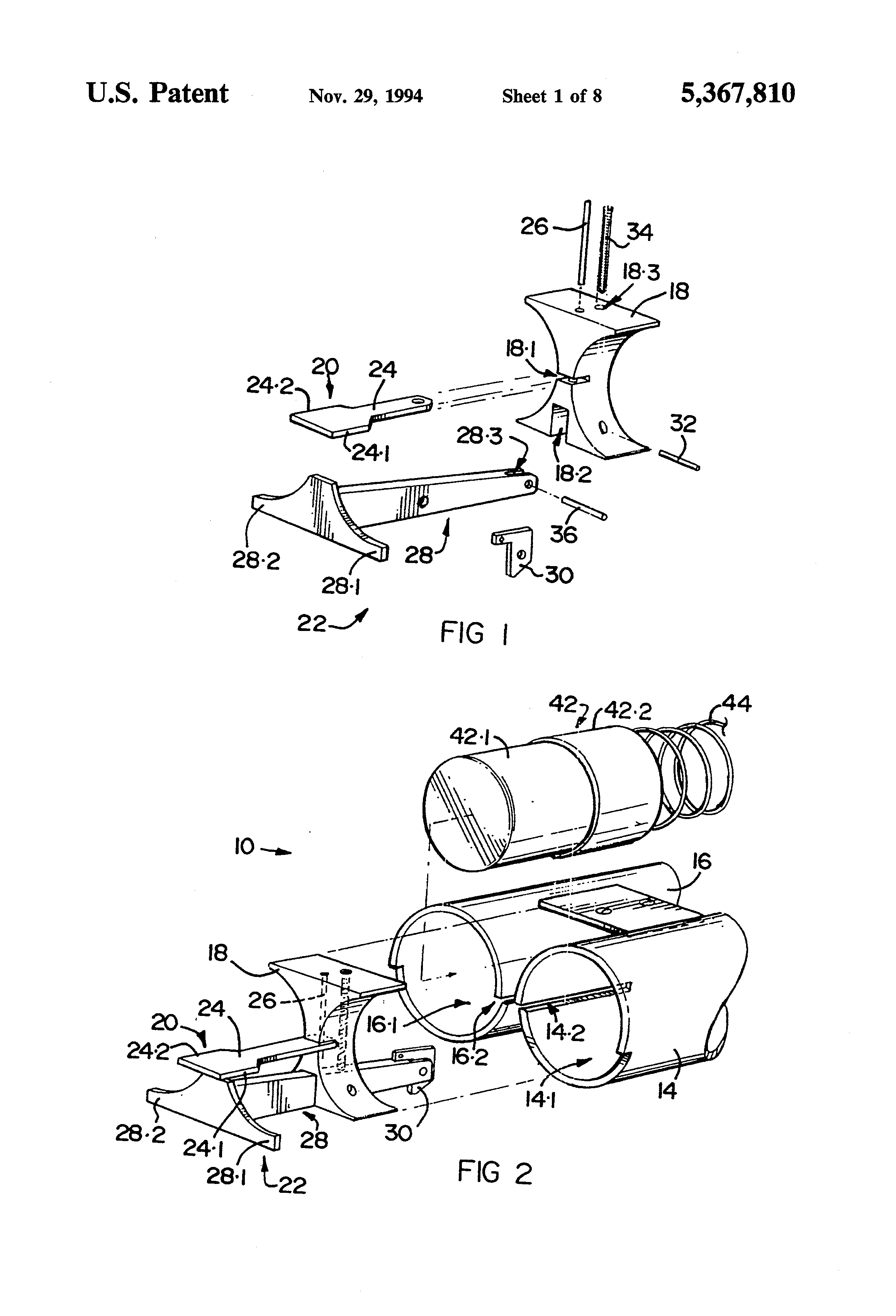
Details of Magazine

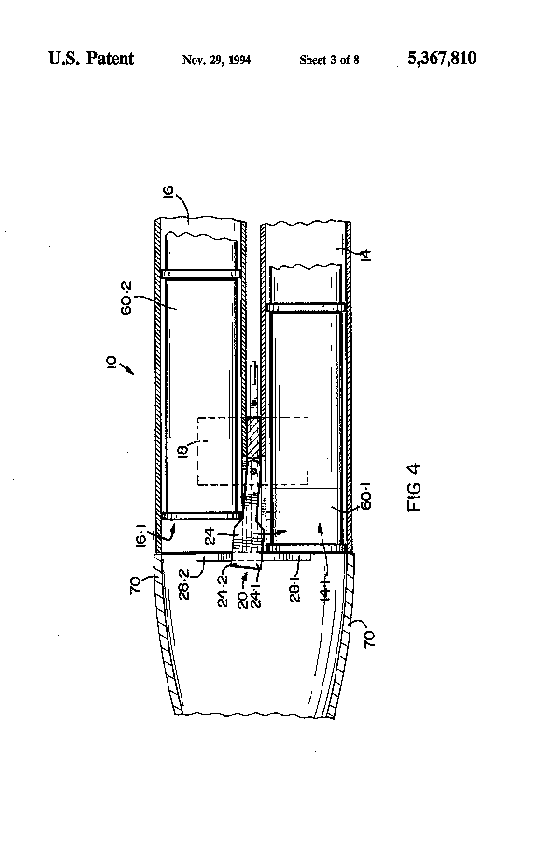
Feeding is possible only from one tube, the other is blocked

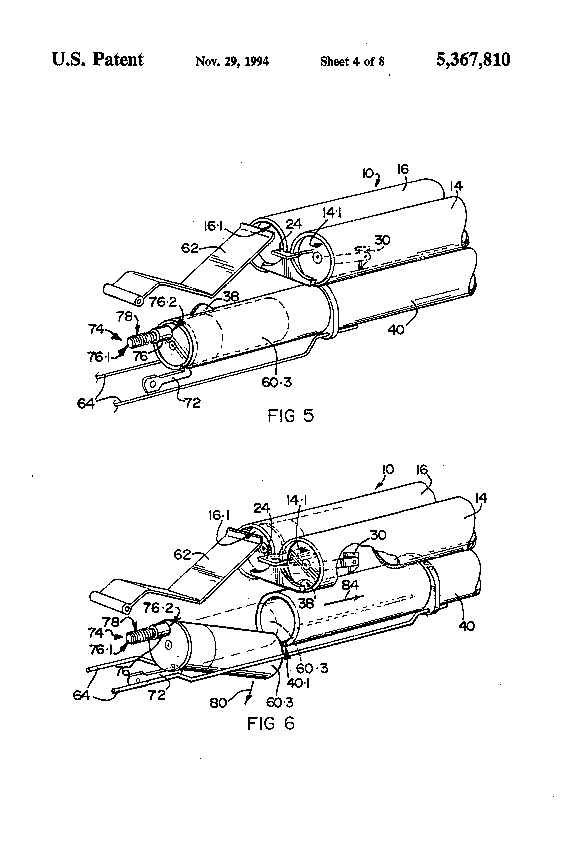
Ejecting the empty shell

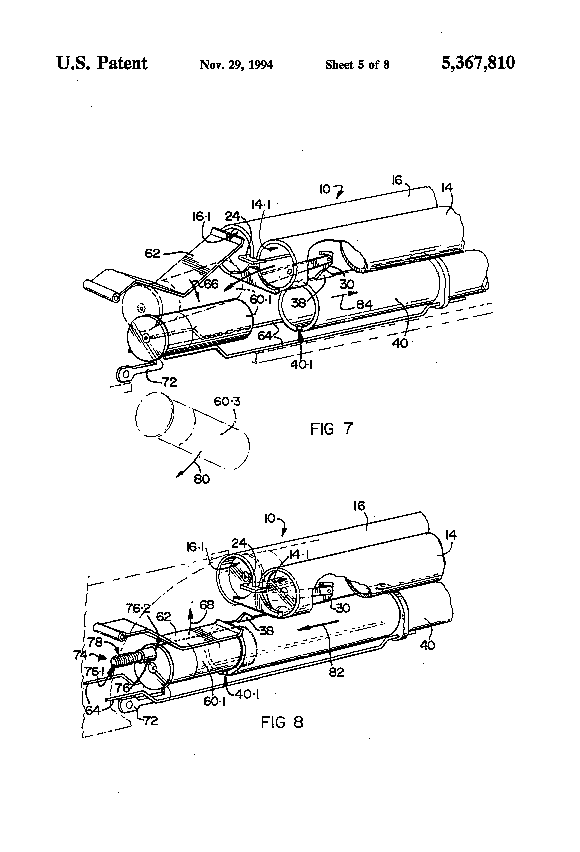
Feeding a new shell

== See also ==
- List of bullpup firearms
- List of shotguns
