= Smith & Wesson Model 1000 =

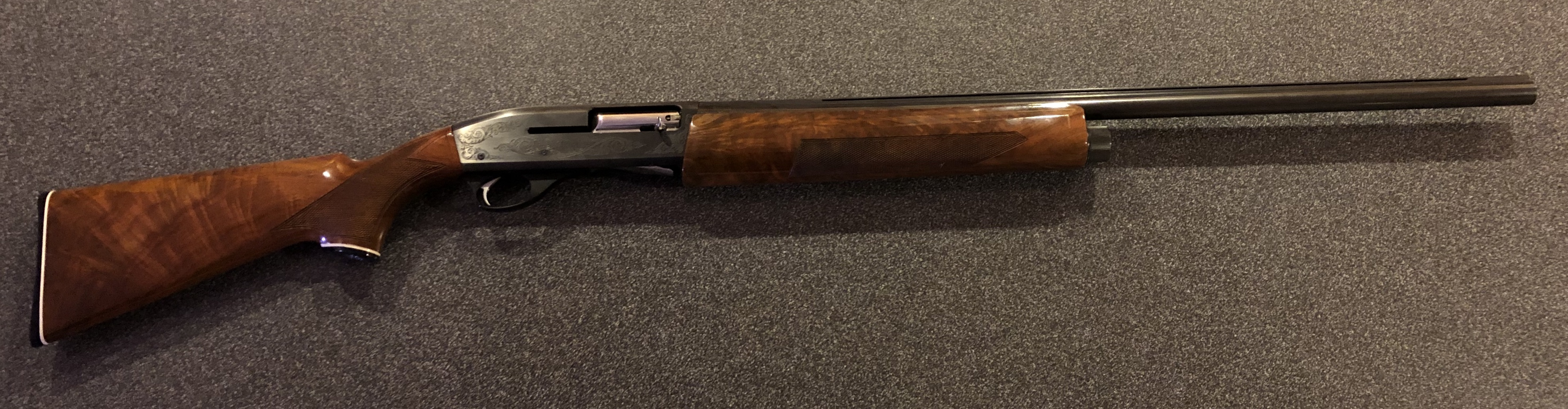
- A 12-gauge 1000T
- Type: Semi-automatic shotgun
- Place of origin: Japan

Production history
- Manufacturer: Howa Machinery
- Produced: c. 1973–1985
- Variants: 1000T (trap); 1000S (skeet)

Specifications
- Mass: 8 lb (3.6 kg) (12 ga. 30" barrel); 7 1/2 lb (3.4 kg) (12 ga. 28" barrel); 6 1/2 lb (2.9 kg) (20 ga. 28" barrel)
- Length: 48 in (120 cm) (28" barrel)
- Barrel length: 26, 28, 30 in (66, 71, 76 cm)
- Cartridge: 12 and 20 gauge
- Action: Semi-automatic
- Feed system: Tube magazine
- Sights: Front- and mid-beads

The Smith & Wesson Model 1000 is a semi-automatic shotgun offered in 12 and 20 gauge by Smith & Wesson during the 1970s and 1980s. The shotguns were developed and manufactured in Japan by Howa Machinery.

== History ==
The Model 1000 was available in 12-gauge and 20-gauge, with trap (1000T) and skeet (1000S) variants. Both gauges were offered with 2 3/4-inch (70 mm) chambers; the 12-gauge was also sold with a 3-inch (76 mm) chamber for magnum shotshells.

The Model 1000 was offered by Smith & Wesson from 1973 to 1985. It was subsequently sold by Mossberg for a few additional years.
