= Pump action =

Firearm operating mechanism

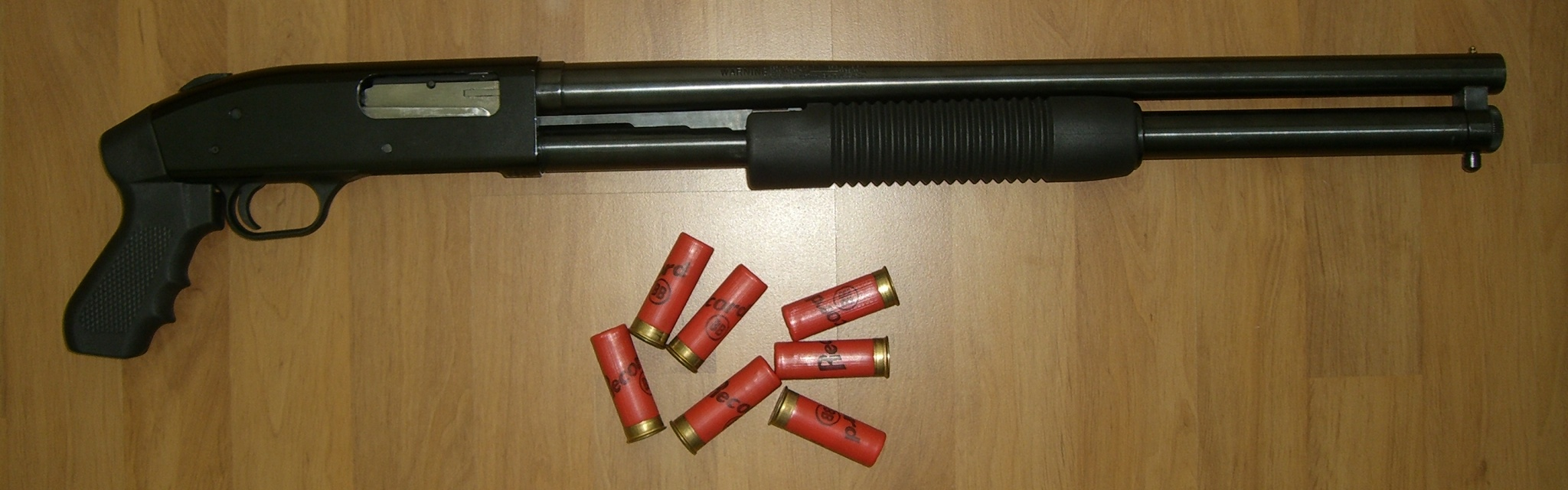
A Mossberg 500 12-gauge stockless pump-action shotgun with a pistol grip

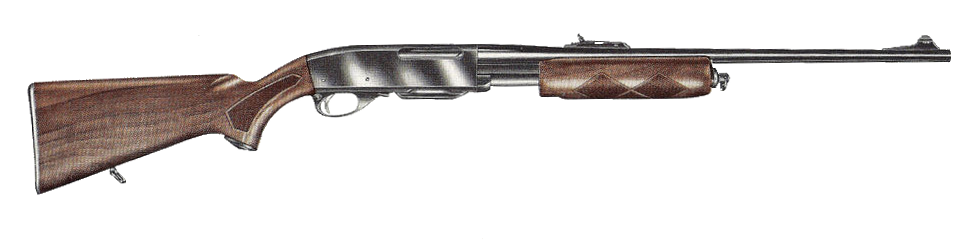
A Remington Model 760 .30-06 Springfield pump-action rifle

Pump action is a type of manual firearm action that is operated by moving a sliding handguard on the gun's forestock. After shooting a round, the sliding handguard is pulled rearward to eject the shell from an expended cartridge if present and typically to cock the hammer or striker, and then pushed forward to load a new cartridge into the chamber. Most pump-action firearms use an integral tubular magazine, although others use detachable box magazines. Pump-action mechanisms are typically found in shotguns, although they also may be found in rifles, grenade launchers, and other types of firearms. A firearm using this operating mechanism is colloquially referred to as a pumpgun.

Because the forend (handguard) is usually manipulated with the support hand, a pump-action firearm can fire additional shots much faster than a bolt-action and somewhat faster than a lever-action, as it does not require the trigger hand to be removed from the trigger while reloading. Also, because the action is cycled in a linear fashion, it creates less torque that can tilt and throw the gun off aim when rapidly firing repeatedly.

== History ==
The first slide action patent, in both single-shot breech-loader and repeating magazine form, was issued to Lewis Jennings of America in 1849, although the pump was actuated via a ring trigger rather than a sliding handguard underneath the barrel. Alexander Bain of Britain patented a pump action harmonica gun in 1854 that was actuated via a sliding piece underneath the barrel. Another pump action firearm with a magazine was the gun patented in America on the 22nd of May in 1866 by Josiah V. Meigs although the pump action was actuated via the trigger guard rather than a sliding handguard underneath the barrel. The first magazine-using pump-action firearm to operate using a sliding handguard underneath the barrel was the firearm patented by William Krutzsch of Britain on the 27th of August in 1866, a few months after Meigs. The first pump-action shotgun to be sold commercially and in substantial quantities was the Spencer 1882. The first pump-action rifle, later shotgun to use a multi-lug rotating bolt was the Fosbery Pump Shotgun of 1891.

Many older pump-action shotguns can be fired faster than modern ones, as they often did not have a trigger disconnector, and were capable of firing a new round as fast as the pump action was cycled, with the trigger held down continuously. This technique is called a slamfire, and was often used in conjunction with the M1897 and M1912 shotguns in World War I trench warfare.

Modern pump-action designs are a little slower than a semi-automatic shotgun, but the pump-action offers greater flexibility in selection of shotshells, allowing the shooter to mix different types of loads and for using low-power or specialty loads. Semi-automatic shotguns must use some of the energy of each round fired to cycle their actions, meaning that they must be loaded with shells powerful enough to reliably cycle. The pump-action avoids this limitation. In addition, like all manual action guns, pump-action guns are inherently more reliable than semi-automatic guns under adverse conditions, such as exposure to dirt, sand, or climatic extremes. Thus, until recently, military combat shotguns were almost exclusively pump-action designs.

== Disadvantages ==
Like most lever-action rifles and shotguns, the majority of pump-action shotguns and rifles use a fixed tubular magazine. This makes for slow reloading, as the cartridges have to be inserted individually into the magazine of the firearm. However, some pump-action shotguns and rifles, including the Russian Zlatoust RB-12, Italian Valtro PM5, American Remington 7600 series, and the Mossberg 590M, use detachable box magazines.

== Layout ==
A pump-action firearm is typically fed from a tubular magazine underneath the barrel, which also serves as a guide to the movable forend. The rounds are fed in one by one through a port in the receiver, where they are pushed forward. A latch at the rear of the magazine holds the rounds in place in the magazine until they are needed. If it is desired to load the gun fully, a round may be loaded through the ejection port directly into the chamber, or cycled from the magazine, which is then topped off with another round. Pump shotguns with detachable box magazines or even drums exist, and may or may not allow the magazine to be inserted without stripping the top round.

== Operating cycle ==
Nearly all pump-actions use a back-and-forward motion of the forend to cycle the action. Only a few pump-actions use the "reverse" or forward-and-back motion of the forend to cycle the action, a few examples are the Russian RMB-93 and South African NeoStead 2000. The forend is connected to the bolt by one or two bars; two bars are considered more reliable because it provides symmetric forces on the bolt and pump and reduces the chances of binding. The motion of the bolt back and forth in a tubular magazine model will also operate the elevator, which lifts the shells from the level of the magazine to the level of the barrel.

After firing a round, the bolt is unlocked and the forend is free to move. The shooter pulls back on the forend to begin the operating cycle. The bolt unlocks and begins to move to the rear, which extracts and ejects the empty shell from the chamber, cocks the hammer, and begins to load the new shell. In a tubular magazine design, as the bolt moves rearwards, a single shell is released from the magazine, and is pushed backwards to come to rest on the elevator.

As the forend reaches the rear and begins to move forward, the elevator lifts up the shell, lining it up with the barrel. As the bolt moves forward, the round slides into the chamber, and the final portion of the forend's travel locks the bolt into position. A pull of the trigger will fire the next round, where the cycle begins again.

Most pump-action firearms do not have any positive indication that they are out of ammunition, so it is possible to complete a cycle and have an empty chamber. The risk of running out of ammunition unexpectedly can be minimized in a tubular magazine firearm by topping off the magazine by loading new rounds to replace the rounds that have just been fired. This is especially important when hunting, as many locations have legal limits on the magazine capacity: for example, three rounds for shotguns and five rounds for rifles.

The BSA Machine Carbine used a unique pump-action that also required twisting the handguard.

Another variant was the Burgess Folding Shotgun from the late 19th century where instead of manipulating the forend to cycle the action, it had a sleeve around the grip area of the stock which the shooter would slide back and forward to cycle the gun. This was done because the forend based pump action was under patent at the time.

== Shotguns ==
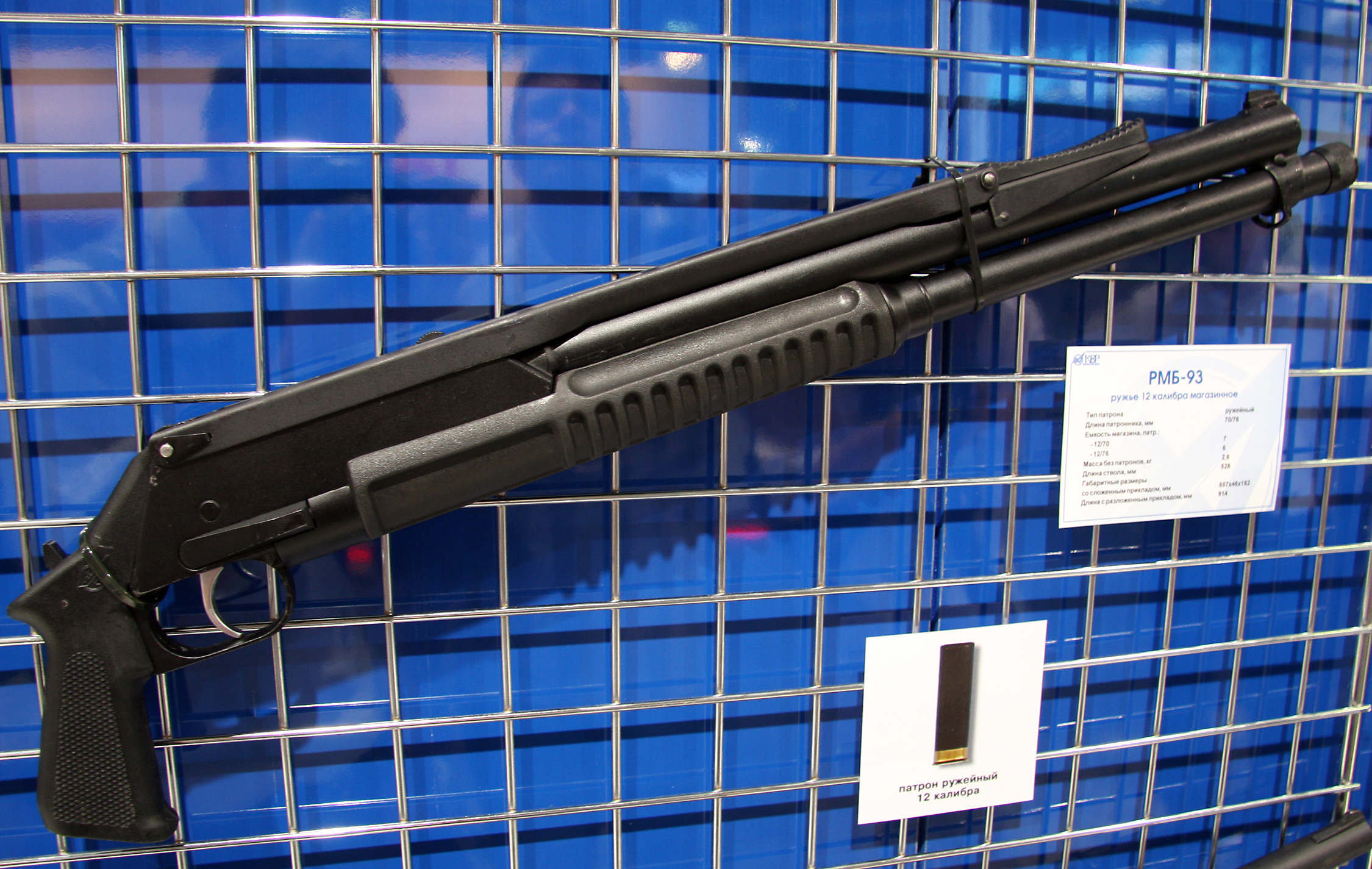
The RMB-93 pump action shotgun which has the barrel below the magazine tube

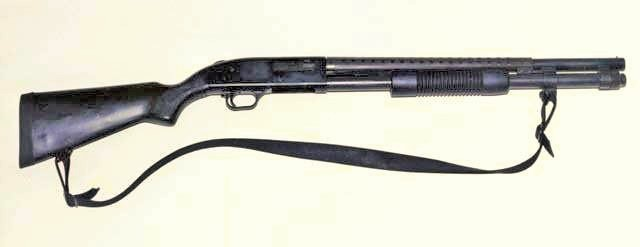
The Mossberg 590 pump action shotgun with the barrel over the tubular magazine

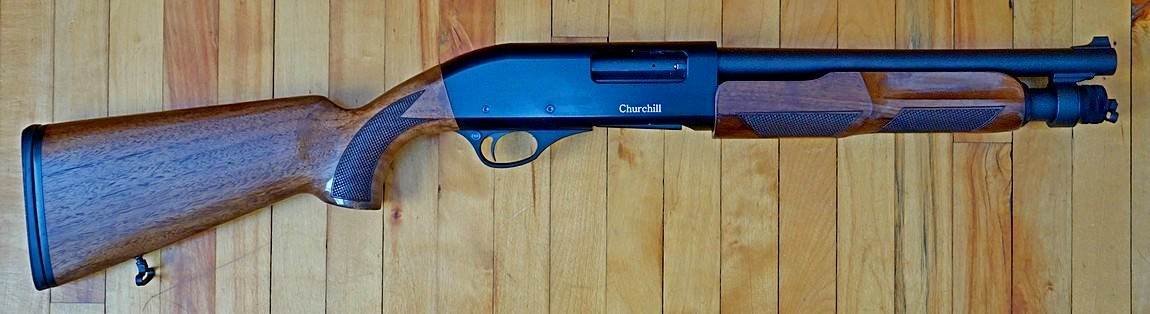
Akkar Churchill SBS (Short Barrel Shotgun) pump action shotgun 12 inch barrel

Pump-action shotguns, also called pump shotguns, slide-action repeating shotguns or slide-action shotguns are the most commonly seen pump-action firearms. These shotguns typically use a tubular magazine underneath the gun barrel to hold the shells, though there are some variants that use either a box magazine or externally mounted "shell holder" racks (usually as "sidesaddle" on one side of the receiver, or on the buttstock) for quick on-field reloading. The shells are chambered and extracted by pulling/pushing the sliding fore-end enveloping the tubular magazine toward the user.

In modern shotguns, the fore-end can be replaceable and often include picatinny rails or M-LOK for mounting accessories such as a tactical light, and the traditional straight grip might be replaced with a pistol grip for a more stable control.

=== Trigger disconnectors ===
Modern pump shotgun designs, such as the Remington 870 and Mossberg 500, have a safety feature called a trigger disconnector, which disconnects the trigger from the sear as the bolt moves back, so that the trigger must be released and pulled again to fire the shotgun after it closes. Many early pump shotguns, such as the Winchester 1897, did not have trigger disconnectors, and would, if the trigger were held back, fire immediately upon closing. Due to the higher rate of fire that this allows, some shooters prefer models without this feature, such as the Ithaca 37, Stevens Model 520/620, and Winchester Model 12.

== Rifles ==
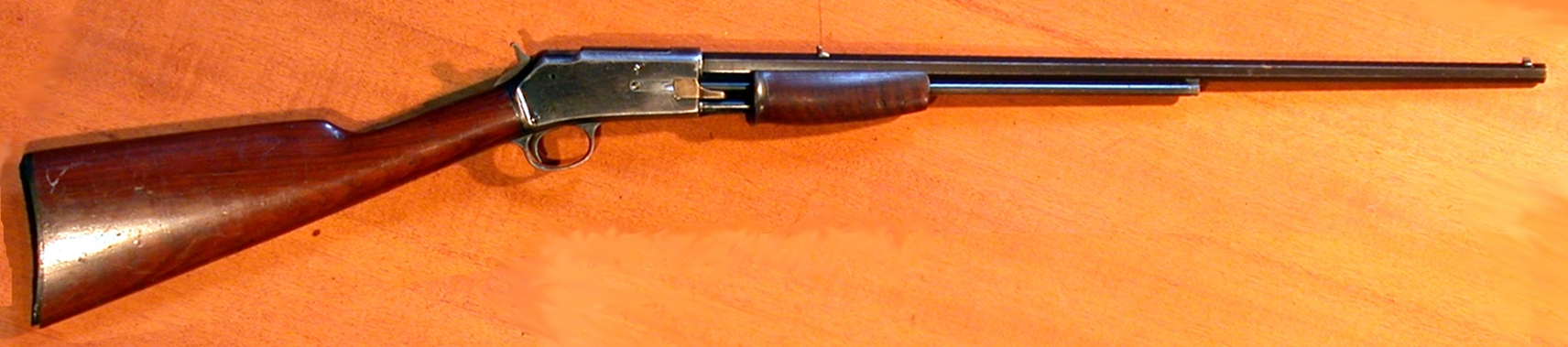
The Colt Lightning pump action rifle

When used in rifles, this action is also commonly called a slide action. In the late 19th and early 20th century it was referred to as a trombone action, because it functioned similarly to the musical instrument of the same name. Colt manufactured the Colt Lightning Carbine from 1884 to 1904 chambered in .44-40 caliber. The slide action Winchester Model 1890 chambered in .22 caliber was one of the most successful repeating rimfire rifle made by Winchester. Approximately 849,000 Model 1890 rifles were produced between 1890 and 1932. Later pump-action rifles were also manufactured by Winchester, Marlin, Browning and Remington.

A "reverse pump-action" design can sometimes be found, where the extraction is done by pushing the fore-end forwards, and re-chambered by pulling backwards. One such 21st-century variant is the Krieghoff Semprio "in-line repeating rifle". The Semprio is a reverse pump-action system that ejects cartridges when the fore-end is pushed forward and loads the chamber when pulled backward. The Semprio's 7-lug bolt head design displays a locking surface of 65 mm^{2} (0.101 in^{2}) compared to the 56 mm^{2} (0.087 in^{2}) of the Mauser M98 bolt-action rifle.

In addition to these firearms, there exists pump-action rifles that are based on the AR and AK rifle platforms that bypass laws restricting and prohibiting semi-auto rifles based on these mentioned platforms from civilian ownership and allow for civilian firearm owners to experience the ergonomics of Modern Sporting Rifles. Examples include the Troy Defense Pump Action Rifle, the Cugir PAR series, the Southern Cross Small Arms Taipan series, and the Wedgetail Industries Modular Pump Rifle (MPR) series.

== Airguns ==
The term pump-action can also be applied to various airsoft guns and air guns, which use a similar mechanism to both load a pellet and compress a spring piston for power, or pneumatic guns where a pump is used to compress the air used for power. See the airgun article for information on how spring piston and pneumatic airguns work.

== Grenade launchers ==
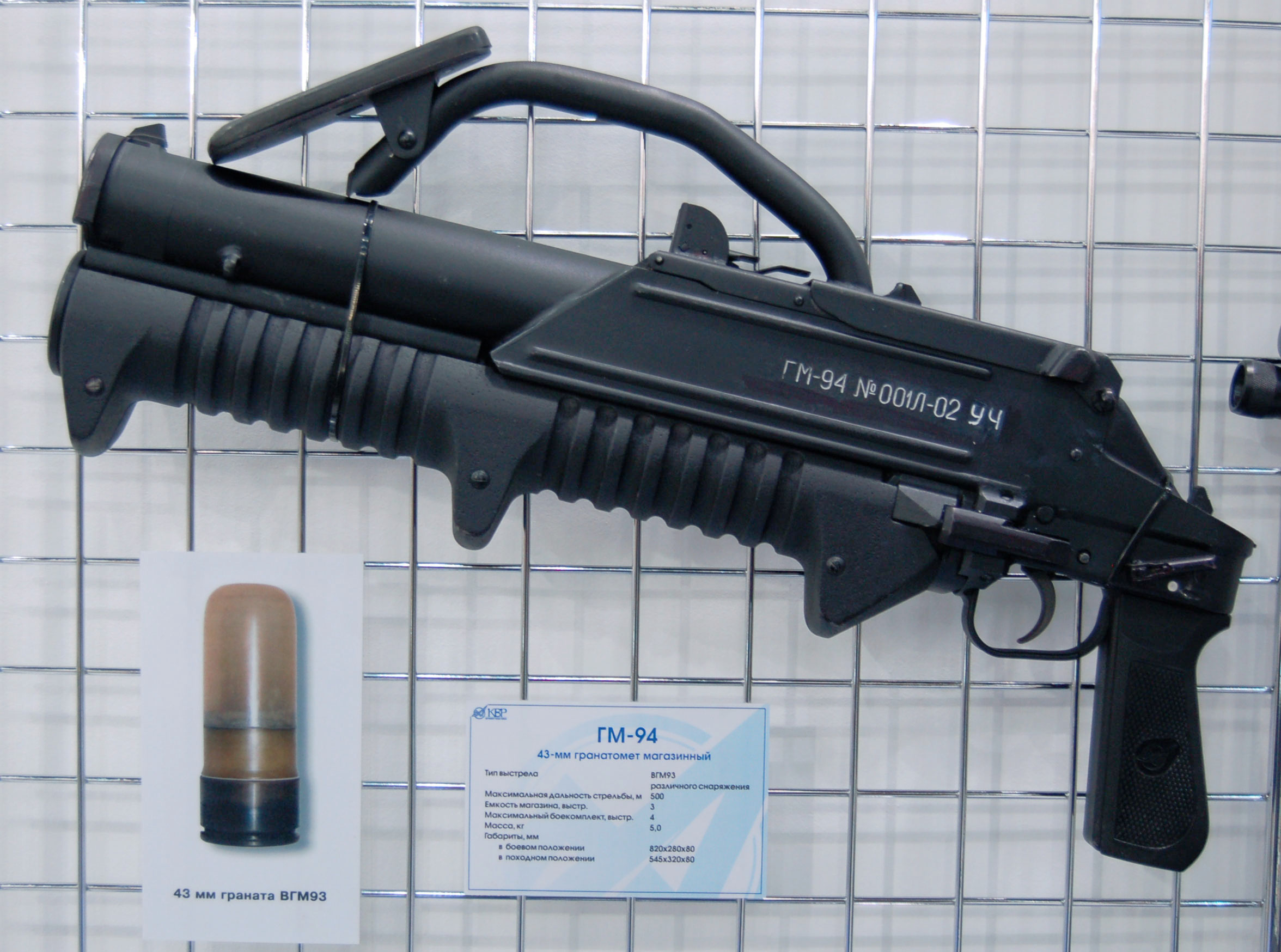
The GM-94 Pump action 43mm Russian grenade launcher

The 43mm GM-94 is a pump-action grenade launcher developed by the KBP design bureau for use by Russian special forces. It carries three rounds in an above-the-barrel tubular magazine.

Another pump-action grenade launcher is the China Lake grenade launcher, which saw usage by the U.S. Navy SEALS in the Vietnam War in limited numbers.

== See also ==
- Cocking handle
- List of pump-action rifles
- BSA experimental model 1949
- Remington 7600

=== Other long gun actions ===
- Single-shot
  - Break-action
  - Rolling block
  - Falling block
- Repeating
  - Revolving
  - Bolt-action
  - Lever-action
  - Self-loading (semi-/fully automatic, select fire)
    - Recoil operation
    - Blowback
    - Blow-forward
    - Gas operation
