= TOZ-B =

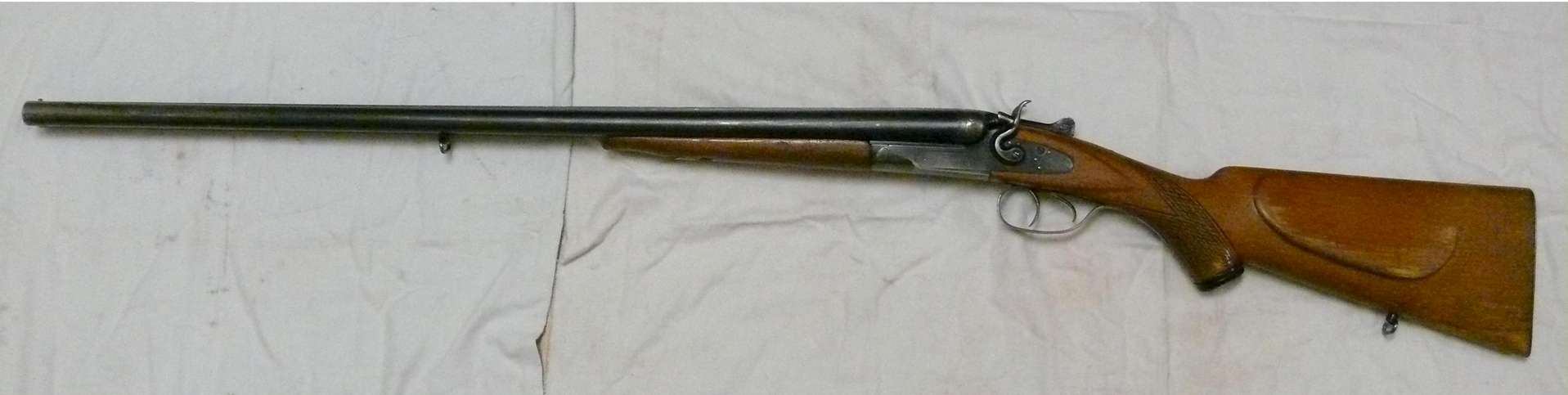
- The TOZ-BM in 16 gauge
- Type: Shotgun
- Place of origin: Russian Empire

Production history
- Manufacturer: Tula Arms Plant
- Produced: 1902–1956 (TOZ-B); 1957–1968 (TOZ-BM)
- Variants: TOZ-B; TOZ-BM

Specifications
- Mass: 3 kg (6.6 lb)-3.25 kg (7.2 lb) (TOZ-B, 16g); 3 kg (6.6 lb)-3.2 kg (7.1 lb) (TOZ-BM, 16g); 2.75 kg (6.1 lb)-3 kg (6.6 lb) (TOZ-BM, 20g)
- Length: 700 mm (28 in)-720 mm (28 in) (TOZ-B, 16g); 700 mm (28 in)-725 mm (28.5 in) (TOZ-BM)
- Cartridge: 16 gauge 20 gauge 12 gauge (Limited)
- Action: Break-action double-barrel shotgun
- Feed system: Breech-loaded
- Sights: Iron sights

The TOZ-B (Russian: ТОЗ-Б) is a Russian break-action side-by-side double-barreled shotgun. It was developed in the Imperial Tula Arms Plant (later Tula Arms Plant) of the Russian Empire in 1902. The TOZ-B has been primarily used for hunting since its introduction.

== History ==
The TOZ-B was developed by the Imperial Tula Arms Plant in 1902 in the Russian Empire for use in hunting birds and game, predominantly in 16-gauge. During World War I and the Russian Civil War, production of hunting weapons ceased nationwide, until production of the TOZ-B restarted in the 1920s. Due to its popularity with hunters in the interwar period, the TOZ-B was affectionately given the nickname of "tulka" or "hammer tulka" (Russian: курковая тулка) because of its exposed hammers. Production of the TOZ-B and other hunting weapons stopped in 1941 during World War II due to the German invasion of the Soviet Union, resuming in 1945 as manufacturing restrictions on certain parts were lifted. Material shortages immediately post-war caused TOZ-B barrels in early post-war batches to be fastened together with a clamp or "muff" rather than soldered, and primary production by Tula focused on the 16-gauge variant.

In 1956, the TOZ-B ended its production, replaced by the modernized TOZ-BM variant in 1957. The TOZ-BM has increased barrel strength compared to its predecessor, and up to 100,000 units were produced per year in the 1960s. The TOZ-BM barrel unit and locking mechanism were used for the TOZ-25, due to the popularity of external hammer double-barrel shotguns in the Soviet Union until the end of the 1950s.

In 1962, R. N. Barlow of GunSport wrote that Soviet hunting weapons such as the TOZ-BM were popular with American athletes and hunters. In 1964, the TOZ-BM 16- and 20- gauge variants were replaced by the TOZ-63, and the 12-gauge variant by the TOZ-66 in 1968.

At a seminar for the House of Technology in Moscow in 1969, TsKIB SOO chief designer V. N. Nikolaev called for the TOZ-BM to be considered "obsolete" and removed from mass production, only to be produced in small batches as souvenirs. Seminar participants disagreed, citing the TOZ-BM will still be purchased by hunters and thus has a "right to exist".

== Design ==
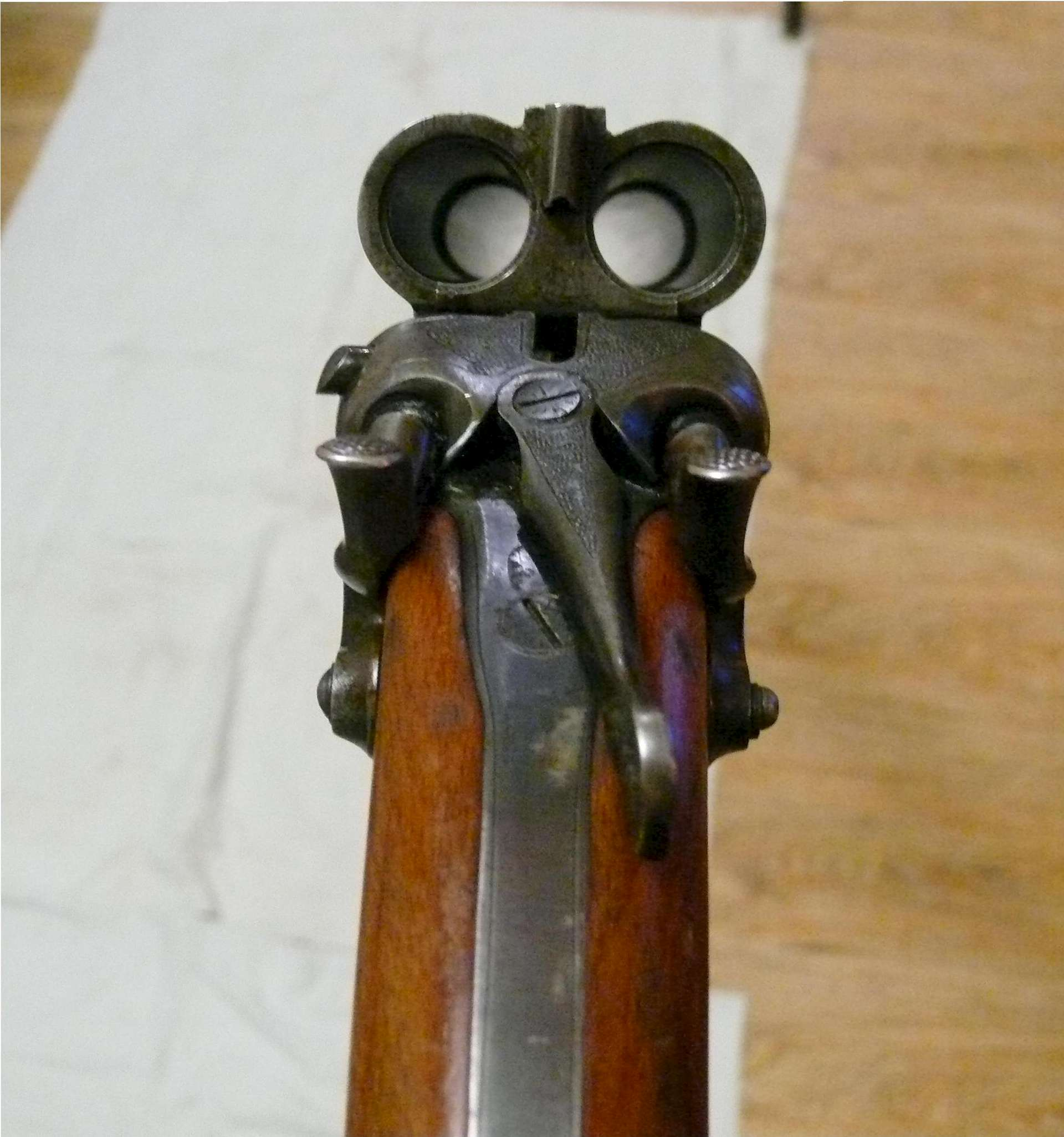
The barrels and breech of a 16-gauge TOZ-BM.

Through the entire production run of the TOZ-B and TOZ-BM, the weapons were mainly manufactured in 16-gauge, with some amounts in 20- and very rare productions in 12-gauge. In each variant, the right barrel is cylinder bore or a modified choke, and the left barrel is equipped with a full choke. The TOZ-B and TOZ-BM were produced with a semi-pistol grip, with rare productions in straight or full pistol grip stock configurations.

The barrels were originally made out of raw steel, switching to heat treatment since at least 1961. The heat treatment process allowed the barrels to be thinner, increasing mechanical strength, improving balance and handling, and reducing weight by roughly 400 grams. In addition to the heat treatment, manufacturing and materials development allowed further improvements and changes to the design such as a different hammer shape, different fastening of lock components and different barrel boring. Simplified manufacturing and increased material quality improved the quality of parts and their kinematics in the 1960s, including the improvement of metal coating to improve corrosion resistance of components, alongside the introduction of chrome plating of the barrel. The trigger guard of the TOZ-B remained popular into the 1980s due to its cheap, durable, and simple design. The barrels were connected by a hinge at the front part of the barrel hook, a hinge pin and a hinge sleeve of the rear part of the fore-end iron frame.

The locking mechanism of all variants was a Purdey triple-lock operated with a top lever and external hammers. The barrels functioned as a standard break-action, in a side-by-side horizontal format. The locks and hammers were mounted on separate steel plates. Two locks of the mechanism functioned with the barrel hooks through operation of the special frame and a transverse Greener crossbolt engaging a round hole in the extension of the shotgun rib similar to the TOZ-63, TOZ-66, and TOZ-54. The chamber length was approximately 70mm. The bore diameter of 18.76mm was manufactured to maximum tolerance for paper cartridges to mitigate deterioration in performance pattern when using a metal cartridge.

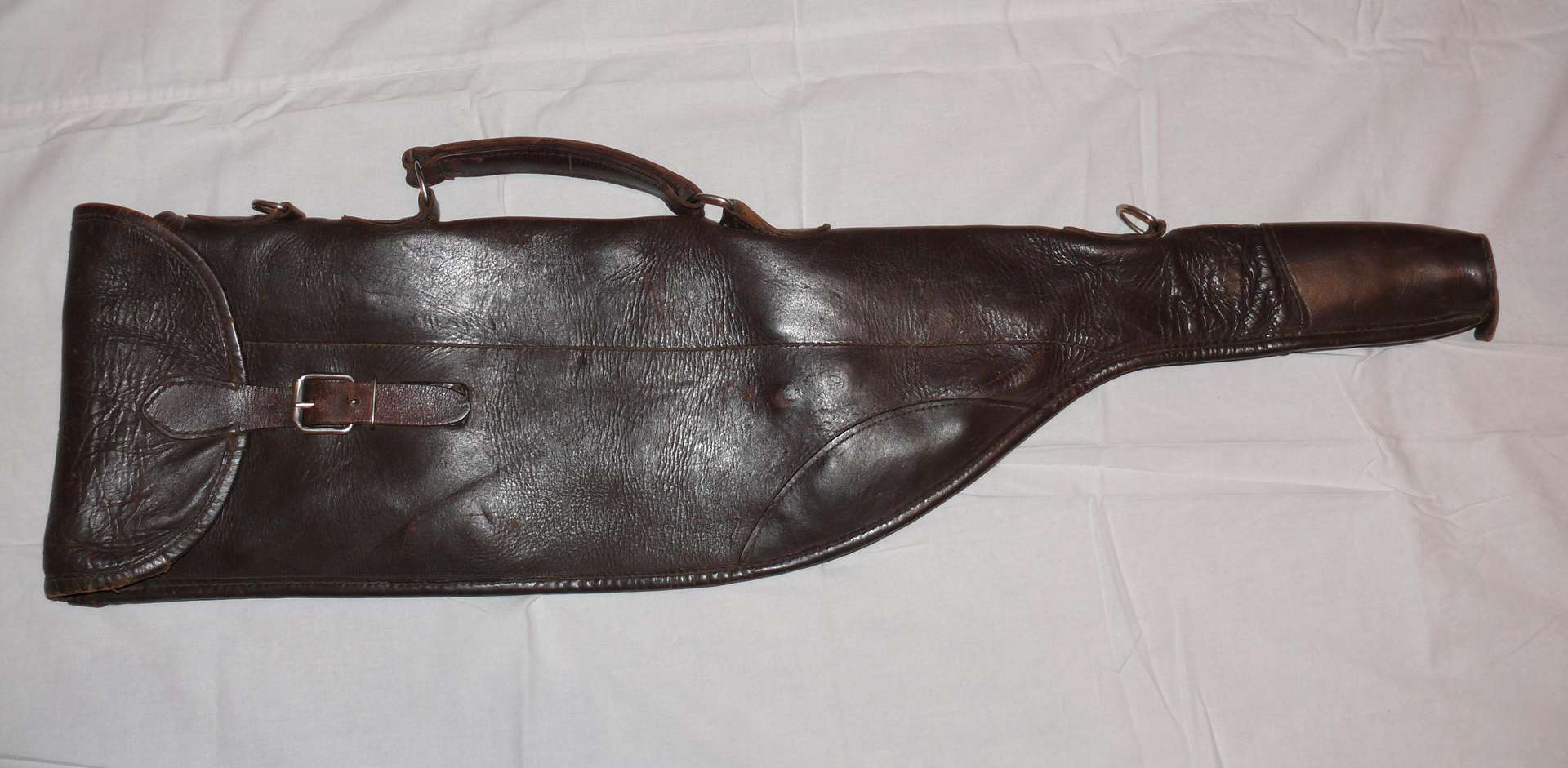
The holster for the TOZ-BM in 16-gauge.

The hammers feature a rebounding mechanism that returns the hammers to a half-cock (safety) position after striking the firing pins. The rigid firing springs in the hammers are relaxed until tensioned by the operator prior to shooting. The external hammers featured drawbacks, including the hammers snagging on clothing and other objects, or being lost or clogged with snow during hunting.

A leather holster was produced for the TOZ-B.

=== TOZ-B ===
The stock of the mass-produced versions of the TOZ-B were assembled using beech or walnut wood, with custom variants only produced in walnut. In the 1950s, the TOZ-B was manufactured with 700-720mm barrels, with custom variants up to 750mm. The 16-gauge variant weighed roughly 3-3.25 kg.

=== TOZ-BM ===
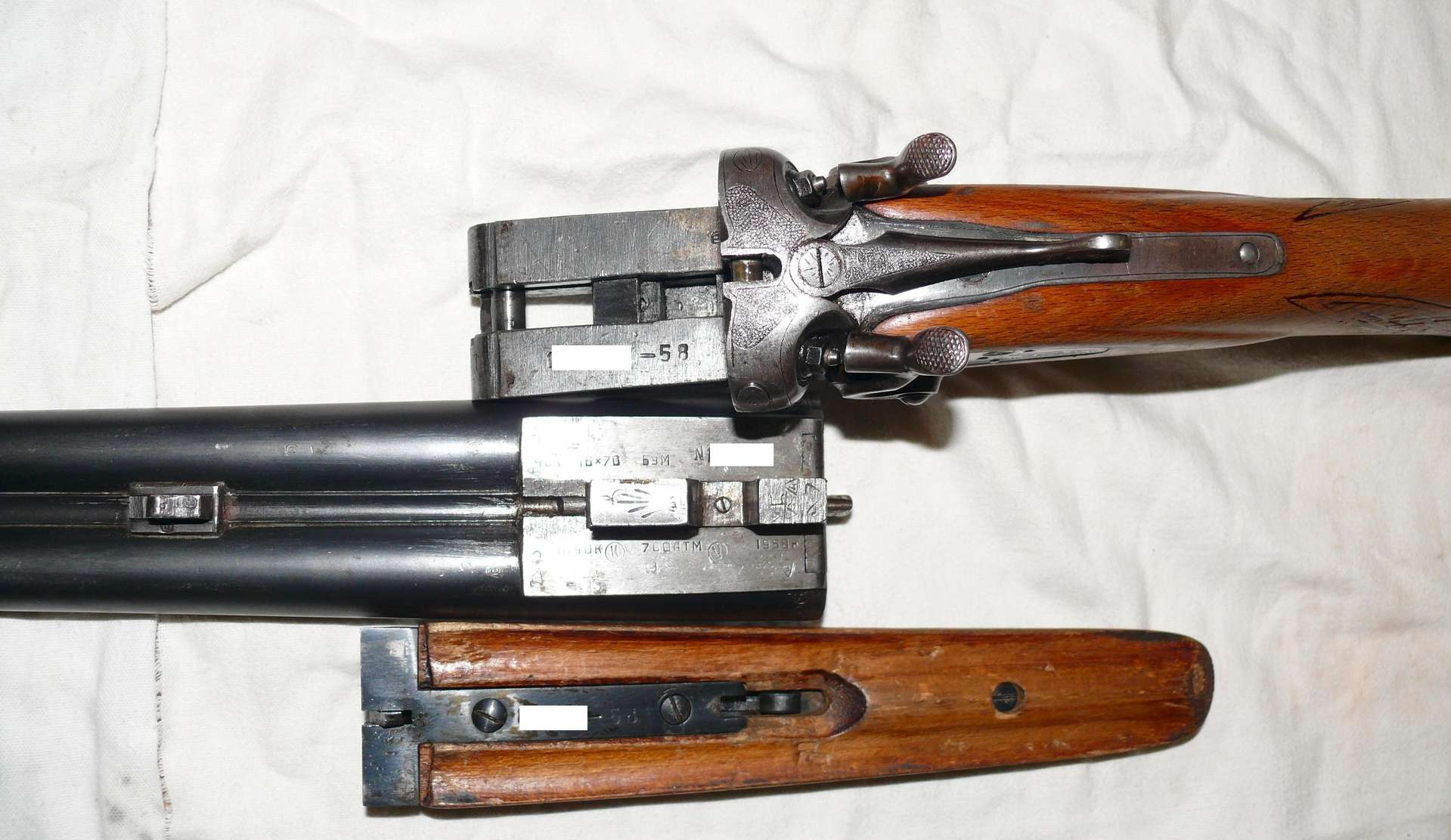
A disassembled TOZ-BM in 16-gauge.

The stocks of the mass-produced versions of the TOZ-BM were assembled using beech and birch wood, with walnut being exclusive to custom variants. The TOZ-BM had a barrel length of 700-725mm. The 16-gauge version weighed roughly 3-3.2 kg, and the 20-gauge version weighed roughly 2.75–3 kg. The bore of the barrel was mainly 0.25mm and 0.5mm for the right and left barrels respectively, sometimes manufactured with bores of 0.5mm and 1mm. The trigger pull is approximately 1.5-2.75 kg for the right trigger, and 1.75–3 kg for the left trigger.

The TOZ-BM was offered, alongside its mass-produced version, an improved variant, and a custom variant, with better shot patterns, custom engraving and finishing, and walnut stocks. The mass-produced version of the TOZ-BM cost 43 rubles and 50 kopeks. The improved and custom versions cost 60 and 82 rubles respectively. Russian firearms magazine MasterGun attributes the popularity of the TOZ-BM in the 1960s to its price being approximately one-third that of an amateur hunter's monthly salary.

A review by E. Petrov of Hunting and Game Management in 1970 noted the TOZ-BM is inefficient to fire due to poor ergonomics of the stock and heavy barrels. Petrov noted that the use of metal cartridges loaded with "Tserentrovoi" primer can reduce the penetration of shot as the primer does not ignite smokeless powder properly, and the barrels were designed for paper shells. In a 2010 test performed by MasterGun, the TOZ-BM had a weaker penetration of shot compared to contemporary shotguns such as the IZh-39.

== In popular culture ==
Due to its popularity and availability within Russia and other former Soviet bloc countries, the TOZ-B has been featured in media developed by studios based in these countries. Its most prevalent feature is in the S.T.A.L.K.E.R series by Ukrainian developers GSC Game World, featuring in a sawed-off variant in use by bandits and rookie Stalkers and able to use slugs, buckshot, and sabot rounds. A full length version was cut from the game due to being too cumbersome, according to the developers. The TOZ-B is also featured in the video games Enlisted and Active Matter, published by Russian-Hungarian company Gaijin Entertainment.
