= TOZ-84 =

Soviet double-barreled shotgun

- Type: double barreled shotgun
- Place of origin: USSR

Production history
- Designer: N. I. Korovyakov; S. V. Popikov
- Manufacturer: Tulsky Oruzheiny Zavod
- Produced: 1980s

Specifications
- Mass: 3.2 kg
- Length: 1175mm
- Barrel length: 711mm
- Width: 55mm
- Height: 210mm
- Caliber: 12 gauge.22 LR, 9×53mmR
- Action: Break action
- Sights: iron sights

The TOZ-84 (ТОЗ-84) is a Soviet double-barreled shotgun.

== History ==
The shotgun was designed in 1980s. In 1984 - 1986, the first TOZ-84 shotguns were made, they were shown at several exhibitions. In 1985 - 1987, several variants of this gun were shown at VDNKh exhibitions in Moscow. In April 1987, it was announced that Tulsky Oruzheiny Zavod would begin mass production of TOZ-84 and this gun will replace in production TOZ-34, TOZ-55 and TOZ-57 models.

However, after the fall of the Soviet Union due to the economic crisis in Russian Federation in the 1990s, Tula Arms Plant decided to discontinue production of TOZ-84 and to continue production of TOZ-34.

== Design ==
TOZ-84 is a hammerless over and under gun, with one barrel above the other. Both barrels have chokes at muzzle end

The frame is made by milling and reinforced by carburisation. All details of trigger mechanism made from high-quality alloy steel

All shotguns equipped with safety mechanism used to help prevent the accidental discharge of a firearm, helping to ensure safer handling.

It has a wooden stock and fore-end.

== Variants ==
- TOZ-84-10 (ТОЗ-84-10) - standard variant with 711mm barrels, smoothbore 12/70 mm shotgun with ejector, 3.2 kg
- TOZ-84-11 (ТОЗ-84-11) - smoothbore shotgun with 711mm barrels, 12/70 mm shotgun without ejector
- TOZ-84-12/32 (ТОЗ-84-12/32) - smoothbore shotgun with 660mm barrels, 12 gauge barrel over 32 gauge barrel, 3.3 kg
- TOZ-84-20/5,6 (ТОЗ-84-20/5,6) - over/under combination gun with a rifled .22 LR barrel over a 20 gauge smoothbore barrel. It has 500mm barrels and can be equipped with 2x magnifying optical sight. The weight of the gun is 2.7 kg without a scope
- TOZ-84-28/5,6 (ТОЗ-84-28/5,6) - over/under combination gun with a rifled .22 LR barrel over a 28 gauge smoothbore barrel. It has 500mm barrels and can be equipped with 2x magnifying optical sight. The weight of the gun is 2.7 kg without a scope
- TOZ-84-12/9,27 (ТОЗ-84-12/9,27) - over/under combination gun with a rifled 9×53mmR barrel over a 12 gauge smoothbore barrel. It has 675mm barrels and can be equipped with optical sight. The weight of the gun is 3.8 kg without a scope

== Sources ==
- ТОЗ-84 // В. Н. Шунков. Охотничьи ружья России. М., ЭКСМО, 2010. стр.200
