= MTs 21-12 =

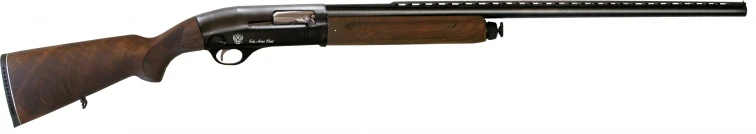
- Type: Semi-automatic shotgun
- Place of origin: USSR

Production history
- Designer: V. A. Nikolaev
- Manufacturer: TsKIB SOO; Tula Arms Plant
- Produced: since 1965
- No. built: over 300 000

Specifications
- Mass: 3.7 kg
- Length: 1275-1285mm
- Barrel length: 750mm
- Width: 65
- Height: 200
- Cartridge: 12/70
- Caliber: 12 gauge
- Feed system: four round tubular magazine, plus 1 in the chamber
- Sights: iron sights

The MTs 21-12 (МЦ 21-12) is a Soviet semi-automatic shotgun.

== History ==
The shotgun was designed in 1956-1958 in TsKIB SOO, it was the first Soviet semi-automatic shotgun. In 1965, the shotgun was awarded the golden medal of the Leipzig Trade Fair.

Since 1965 began the serial production of the shotgun by Tula Arms Plant. The price of one standard MTs 21-12 was 350 roubles and custom guns were more expensive.

In February 1981 a detachable ring sight was proposed for this shotgun. In April 1981, the price of one standard MTs 21-12 was 335 roubles and custom guns were more expensive.

In December 1988, MTs 21-12 was the most common semi-automatic hunting shotgun in the Soviet Union (the second was Browning Auto-5), although TOZ-87 had already begun to make.

After the fall of the Soviet Union due to the economic crisis in Russian Federation in the 1990s, the prices of firearms increased. In September 1994, the cost of one new standard serial MTs 21-12 shotgun was from 480 thousand roubles to 3.3 million roubles.

Over 300 000 MTs 21-12 shotguns were produced. Unknown number of shotguns were sold in foreign countries.

== Design ==
MTs 21-12 is a smoothbore shotgun.

The detachable barrel is chrome-plated and has 1mm choke at the muzzle end.

It has a walnut shoulder stock (with or without cheekpiece) and fore-end

Shotgun shells with paper or plastic cases must be used for shooting. It should be taken into account that the USSR produced two different types of 12 gauge plastic cases, and for shooting from MTs 21-12 it was recommended to use plastic cases with a length of 67.5-68 mm, made according to GOST 23568-79.

== Variants ==
- MTs 21 (МЦ 21) - the first version, was produced by TsKIB SOO in small numbers for less than a decade. It was chambered for 12, 16 and 20 gauge
- MTs 21-12 (МЦ 21-12) - the main production version, was produced by Tula Arms Plant from 1965 and was chambered only for 12/70 shells
- MTs 21-12P (МЦ 21-12П)
- MTs 21-12R (МЦ 21-12Р) - MTs 21-12 with rubber recoil pad on its shoulder stock
- MTs 22-12 (МЦ 22-12) - was chambered only for 12/65 mm shells, and only one prototype was made in 1960
- TTs 22 (ТЦ 22) - next model

== Users ==
- USSR
- Belarus - is allowed as civilian hunting weapon
- Moldova - is allowed as civilian hunting weapon
- Russian Federation - is allowed as civilian hunting weapon

== Museum exhibits ==
- MTs 21-12 shotgun is in collection of Tula State Arms Museum in Tula Kremlin
- MTs 21-12 shotgun is in collection of Museum of hunting and fishing in Moscow.

== Sources ==
- Охотничье самозарядное ружьё МЦ 21 // Охотничье, спортивное огнестрельное оружие. Каталог. М., 1958. стр.28-29
- Охотничье самозарядное ружьё МЦ 21 // Спортивно-охотничье оружие и патроны. Бухарест, "Внешторгиздат", 1965. стр.20-21
- Ружьё МЦ 21 // Охотничье огнестрельное оружие отечественного производства. Справочное методическое пособие для экспертов-криминалистов, следователей и оперативных работников органов МВД / под ред. А. И. Устинова. М., 1969. стр.107
- В. Шостаковский. Тульский полуавтомат в работе. Как разобрать, собрать, отладить МЦ 21-12 // журнал «Охота и охотничье хозяйство», № 7, 1980. стp.30-32
- В. Бабкин. Охотничье самозарядное. МЦ 21: эксплуатация и уход // журнал «Охота и охотничье хозяйство», № 4, 1990. стp.20-21
- Схема МЦ 21-12 // журнал "Мастер-ружьё", No. 55, 2001. стр.48-49
- А. Азаров. За что я люблю МЦ 21-12 // журнал «Охота и охотничье хозяйство», No. 6, 2014. стр.25-26
