= TTs 22 =

Soviet shotgun

TTs 22 (MTs 22)
- Type: semi-automatic shotgun
- Place of origin: USSR

Production history
- Designer: Yu. V. Dyablov
- Designed: 1986 - 1988
- Manufacturer: TsKIB SOO

Specifications
- Mass: 3.6 kg
- Length: 1230
- Barrel length: 700mm
- Width: 45
- Height: 110
- Cartridge: 12/70
- Caliber: 12 gauge
- Feed system: four round tubular magazine, plus 1 in the chamber
- Sights: iron sights

The TTs 22 (ТЦ 22) is a Soviet semi-automatic shotgun.

== History ==
The shotgun was designed in 1986–1988 in TsKIB SOO as new standard semi-automatic hunting shotgun, which was supposed to replace previous models MTs 21-12 and TOZ-87.

In October 1987, the first TTs 22 shotgun was shown at VDNKh exhibition in Moscow.

In 1987-1988 first two prototypes were made (serial number 0001 and serial number 0002). In 1989, they successfully passed all tests and trials. After that, the state commission ordered to begin production of this model.

All drawings, schemes and other necessary technical documents were sent from Tula to Uralsk machine-building plant "Metallist" (in Uralsk, Kazakh Soviet Socialist Republic).

However, after the fall of the Soviet Union Kazakhstan became an independent state. Due to the economic crisis in the 1990s the plant had problems.

It was announced that production of TTs 22 shotgun will be continued under designation MTs 22 but the production of this shotguns was discontinued.

== Design ==
TTs 22 (MTs 22) is a gas-operated smoothbore shotgun with a short-stroke piston and adjustable gas system. It is equipped with manual safety mechanism.

It has a walnut stock and detachable fore-end.

It has milled steel receiver which is made from high-quality steel (3ХН2МФА steel).

== Sources ==
- Товары народного потребления. Каталог. Автомобили. Мотоциклы. Мотороллеры. Спортивно-охотничье оружие и патроны / сост. Н. В. Аксенов. М., 1988.
