= MTs 20-01 =

- Type: bolt-action shotgun
- Place of origin: USSR

Production history
- Designer: Yu. I. Berezin
- Manufacturer: TsKIB SOO; Tulsky Oruzheiny Zavod

Specifications
- Mass: 2.85 kg
- Length: 1150mm
- Barrel length: 635mm
- Cartridge: 20, 28 and 32 gauge
- Action: bolt action
- Rate of fire: variable
- Feed system: 2/4 round box magazine
- Sights: iron sights

The MTs 20-01 (МЦ 20-01) is a Soviet bolt-action shotgun.

== History ==
The lightweight hunting shotgun MTs 20 was designed in 1957-1960s in TsKIB SOO, although its serial production began at the Tulsky Oruzheiny Zavod. The first information and the first photograph of this new experimental lightweight hunting shotgun were published in August 1961.

In the summer of 1969, the production of 28 and 32 gauge variants of the MTs 20 was announced.

In 1979, the first model was replaced by the second model (MTs 20-01).

In 1988 - 1989, the price of one standard MTs 20-01 was 170 roubles.

In early 1990s new compact variants were designed (MTs 20-04, MTs 20-08 and MTs 20-09).

After the fall of the Soviet Union due to the economic crisis in Russian Federation in the 1990s, the prices of firearms increased. In September 1994, the cost of one new standard serial MTs 20-01 shotgun was from 200 thousand roubles to 220 thousand roubles.

== Design ==
The shotgun has single column detachable box magazine and smoothbore barrel with chrome plating. The bolt has two lugs.

All shotguns equipped with safety mechanism used to help prevent the accidental discharge of a firearm, helping to ensure safer handling.

== Variants ==
- MTs 20 (МЦ 20) - the first version, was produced in small numbers since 1964 until 1971. Some shotguns had wooden stock and fore-end (walnut or birch), other had black plastic furniture. These first guns had only 2-round magazine.
- MTs 20-01 (МЦ 20-01) - standard serial version, 20 gauge (20/70 mm R). It was produced by Tulsky Oruzheiny Zavod with birch stock and fore-end
- MTs 20-01M (МЦ 20-01M) - standard serial MTs 20-01 equipped with optical sight
- MTs 20-02 (МЦ 20-02) - 28 gauge version, it was produced since 1969 in small numbers
- MTs 20-03 (МЦ 20-03) - 32 gauge version, it was produced since 1969
- MTs 20-04 (МЦ 20-04) - compact model with short barrel, metal stock that folds underneath the weapon in order to make it more compact, and pistol grip. This gun was launched in serial production in the early 1990s under the name TOZ-106
- MTs 20-07 (МЦ 20-07) - bolt-action rifle (.308 Winchester)
- MTs 20-08 (МЦ 20-08) - standard serial MTs 20-01 with 550 mm barrel, wooden pistol grip and without stock
- MTs 20-09 (МЦ 20-09) - standard serial MTs 20-01 with 550 mm barrel and fixed wooden stock

== Users ==
- USSR
- Belarus - is allowed as civilian hunting weapon
- Moldova - is allowed as civilian hunting weapon
- Russian Federation - is allowed as civilian hunting weapon

== Sources ==
- Промысловое одноствольное магазинное ружьё МЦ 20 // Спортивно-охотничье оружие и патроны. Бухарест, "Внешторгиздат", 1965. стр.18-20
- Ружьё модели МЦ 20 // Охотничье огнестрельное оружие отечественного производства. Справочное методическое пособие для экспертов-криминалистов, следователей и оперативных работников органов МВД / под ред. А. И. Устинова. М., 1969. стр.99
- инженеры А. Захарян, Ю. Березин. Новые модели. МЦ 20-01 // журнал "Охота и охотничье хозяйство", № 6, 1989. стр.26
- Александр Поваренков. МЦ-20-01: вариация на тему берданки // журнал "Мастер-ружьё", № 1 (82), январь 2004. стр.50-53
- Ружья с продольно скользящим затвором МЦ 20 // В. Н. Трофимов. Отечественные охотничьи ружья гладкоствольные. М., ДАИРС, 2000. стр.61-70
