= TOZ-55 =

TOZ-55 «Zubr»
- Type: double barreled shotgun
- Place of origin: USSR

Production history
- Designer: N. I. Korovyakov
- Manufacturer: Tulsky Oruzheiny Zavod
- Produced: since 1975

Specifications
- Mass: 3.8 kg
- Barrel length: 600mm, 675mm
- Caliber: 12 gauge 9×53mmR
- Action: Break action
- Rate of fire: variable
- Sights: iron sights optical sight

The TOZ-55 «Zubr» (ТОЗ-55 «Зубр») is a Soviet double-barreled combination gun for big-game hunting.

== History ==
In the early 1970s N. I. Korovyakov began work on design the new model of double-barreled combination gun based on design of his TOZ-34 shotgun. In 1975, first TOZ-55 «Zubr» shotguns were made.

In April 1987, it was announced that Tula Arms Plant would begin mass production of new TOZ-84 shotgun and this gun will replace in production TOZ-34, TOZ-55 and TOZ-57. After this, production of TOZ-55 was discontinued.

However, even in December 1988 TOZ-55 was the most common hunting firearm in 9×53mmR caliber in the Soviet Union.

After the fall of the Soviet Union, some unfinished TOZ-55 shotguns and their spare parts remained in Tula Arms Plant. In 1990s it was announced that new TOZ-55-2 «Zubr» combination gun will be made. However, due to the economic crisis in Russian Federation in 1992 production of 9×53mmR ammunition was discontinued and TOZ decided not to make this model and to continue production of TOZ-34.

== Design ==
TOZ-55 is an over and under hammerless shotgun, with one barrel above the other.

All TOZ-55s were equipped with three pairs of detachable chrome plated barrels

- a pair of 9mm rifled barrels (600mm)
- a pair of 12/70mm smoothbore shotgun barrels (675mm)
- a rifled 9mm barrel over a 12 gauge smoothbore barrel

All TOZ-55s have iron sights and they were equipped with scope base for optical sight.

- PO-4×34 (ПО-4×34), TO-6P (ТО-6П) and TO-6PM (ТО-6ПМ) scopes were standard optical sights, although custom aftermarket variants are known.

All TOZ-55 have a walnut stock and fore-end, some of them were decorated with engravings.

== Variants ==
- TOZ-55-2 «Zubr» (ТОЗ-55-2 «Зубр») - simplified and cheaper version of TOZ-55. It was equipped with one pair of detachable barrels (a rifled 9mm barrel with six right grooves over a 12 gauge smoothbore barrel)
- TOZ-55-3 «Zubr» (ТОЗ-55-3 «Зубр») - simplified and cheaper version of TOZ-55. It was equipped with one pair of detachable barrels (a 12 gauge smoothbore shotgun)
- TOZ-56 (ТОЗ-56) - test prototype, a double-barreled combination gun (with rifled 9mm barrel and smoothbore barrel)

== Users ==
- Soviet Union
- Latvia
- Russian Federation
- USA - the import was allowed

== Sources ==
- Новинки охотничьего оружия. Двуствольное ружьё ТОЗ-55 "Зубр" // журнал «Охота и охотничье хозяйство», No. 12, 1972. стр.29
- ТОЗ-55 // История Тульского оружейного завода, 1712 - 1972. М., "Мысль", 1973. стр.488
