= Anatoly Onoprienko =

Soviet-Ukrainian serial mass murderer

Anatoly Onoprienko Анатолій Онопрієнко
- Mugshot of Anatoly Onoprienko
- Born: Anatoly Yuriyovych Onoprienko; 25 July 1959; Lasky, Zhytomyr Oblast, Ukrainian SSR, USSR
- Died: 27 August 2013 (aged 54); Zhytomyr, Zhytomyr Oblast, Ukraine
- Other names: The Beast of Ukraine; The Terminator; Citizen O
- Motive: Misanthropy, robbery
- Conviction: Murders
- Penalty: Death; commuted to life imprisonment

Details
- Victims: 52
- Span of crimes: 1989–1996
- Country: Soviet Union (Note: Ukrainian SSR was a part of USSR since 1922 till it was dissolved in 1991.); Ukraine
- Weapons: Sawed-off TOZ-34 double-barreled shotgun, knife, screwdriver
- Date apprehended: 16 April 1996

Anatoly Yuriyovych Onoprienko (Ukrainian: Анатолій Юрійович Онопрієнко; Russian: Анато́лий Ю́рьевич Оноприе́нко, Anatoly Yuryevich Onoprienko; 25 July 1959 – 27 August 2013) was a Soviet and Ukrainian serial killer and mass murderer. Known by the nicknames The Beast of Ukraine, The Terminator, and Citizen O, Onoprienko confessed to killing fifty-two people upon being apprehended in April 1996.

== Early life ==
Anatoly Onoprienko was born in the village of Lasky in Zhytomyr Oblast, Ukrainian SSR, Soviet Union. He was the younger of two sons; his brother, Valentin, was thirteen years older. His father, Yuri Onoprienko, was decorated for bravery while serving on the Eastern Front during the Second World War.

Onoprienko's mother died when he was four years old. He was cared for by his grandparents and aunt for a time before being handed over to an orphanage in the village of Pryvitne, Volyn Oblast. According to Onoprienko, he resented the fact that he had been given away by his father, while his brother continued to stay under his care. In one interview, he later alleged that it was this that predetermined his destiny, and remarked that seventy percent of those brought up in orphanages end up in prison as adults.

== Murders ==
When finally arrested by police, Onoprienko was found to be in possession of a total of 122 items, including a sawed-off TOZ-34 shotgun, a number of other weapons which matched those used in several killings, and a number of items which had been removed from victims. He eventually confessed to eight killings between 1989 and 1995. He initially denied other charges but ultimately confessed to the killing of fifty-two victims over a six-year period. While in custody, Onoprienko claimed that he killed in response to commands he was given by inner voices.

The following murders were confessed by Onoprienko, in chronological order:

1–10. In 1989, a family of ten – two adults and eight children – were killed during an attempted robbery. Onoprienko confessed that he and an accomplice, Sergei Rogozin, committed the murders with weapons that they carried for self-defense. He also stated that he cut off all contact with Rogozin afterwards.

11–15. In that same year, five people, including an 11-year-old boy, were shot dead while sleeping in a car before their bodies were burned. Onoprienko stated that the murders were unintentional and that he had planned only to burglarize the car.

16–19. On 24 December 1995, the Zaichenko family of four were killed with a sawed-off TOZ-34 double-barreled shotgun during a robbery in their home at Garmarnia, a village in central Ukraine, which was set ablaze afterwards.

20–24. On 2 January 1996, a family of four were shot and killed. The murders were quickly followed by that of a male pedestrian whom Onoprienko killed in order to eliminate potential witnesses.

25–28. On 6 January 1996, Onoprienko allegedly killed four people in three separate incidents on the Berdyansk-Dnieprovs'k highway, by stopping cars before killing the drivers. The victims were Kasai, a Ukrainian Navy ensign; Savitsky, a taxi driver; Kochergina, a kolkhoz cook; and an unidentified victim.

29–35. On 17 January 1996, the Pilat family of five were shot and killed in their home, which was then set ablaze. Two potential witnesses were then killed, a 27-year-old railroad worker named Kondzela and a 56-year-old pedestrian named Zakharko.

36–39. On 30 January 1996, Marusina, her two sons, and a 32-year-old visitor named Zagranichniy were all shot dead in Fastiv, Kyiv Oblast.

40–43. On 19 February 1996, the Dubchak family were killed in their home in Olevsk, Zhytomyr Oblast. According to Onoprienko, he shot and killed the father and the son, mauled the mother to death with a hammer, and demanded money from the daughter before mauling her to death as well when she refused.

44–48. On 27 February 1996, the Bodnarchuk family were killed in their home in Malyn, Zhytomyr Oblast. According to Onoprienko, he fatally shot the parents and then hacked the daughters, aged seven and eight, to death with an axe. An hour later, Onoprienko then allegedly shot and killed a neighbouring businessman named Tsalk who was wandering around the Bodnarchuk property, hacking his corpse with the axe afterwards.

49–52. On 22 March 1996, the Novosad family of four was Onoprienko's last alleged victims. According to him, he shot and killed all of the family members and set their home on fire to eliminate any traces of evidence.

== Methods ==
Onoprienko's modus operandi consisted of choosing an isolated house and gaining the attention of the occupants by creating a commotion. He would kill all occupants starting with the adult male, before going to find and kill the spouse and finally the children. He would then usually set the buildings alight in an attempt to cover the evidence. He would also kill any potential witness who crossed his path during his murderous rampages.

== Capture and conviction ==
In March 1996, the Security Service of Ukraine (SBU) and Public Prosecutor's Office specialists detained 26-year-old Yury Mozola as a suspect in several brutal murders. Over the course of three days, six SBU members and one representative of the Public Prosecutor's Office tortured Mozola. Mozola refused to confess to the crimes and died during the torture. Seven responsible for the death were sentenced to prison terms. Seventeen days later, the real murderer, Onoprienko, was found after a massive manhunt, seven years after his first murder. This happened after he moved in with one of his relatives and his stash of weapons was discovered. Onoprienko was forced to leave the house. Days later, from the information received, Onoprienko was captured.

Onoprienko was sentenced to death, but had his sentence commuted to life imprisonment; in 1995 Ukraine had entered the Council of Europe and thus (at the time) it undertook to abolish capital punishment. (Note: In 2000 the “death penalty” was withdrawn from the list of official punishments of Ukraine.)

== Death ==
Onoprienko died in Zhytomyr prison on 27 August 2013, at the age of 54 of heart failure

== See also ==
- List of serial killers by country
- List of serial killers by number of victims
