= TOZ-57 =

- Type: double barreled shotgun
- Place of origin: USSR

Production history
- Manufacturer: Tula Arms Plant

Specifications
- Mass: 3.8 kg
- Length: 1100, 1130 or 1185
- Barrel length: 675, 711 or 750
- Width: 55
- Height: 210
- Caliber: 12 gauge
- Action: Break action
- Rate of fire: variable
- Sights: iron sights

The TOZ-57 (ТОЗ-57) is a family of Soviet double-barreled high-quality skeet shotguns.

== History ==
Development of the TOZ-57 began in connection with the growing popularity of skeet shooting in the USSR in the 1970s. The first prototypes were made in 1974.

In 1977, TOZ-57 shotgun was awarded the golden medal of the Leipzig Trade Fair and received the State quality mark of the USSR. In July 1978, TOZ-57K and TOZ-57K-1S were officially announced as new models of skeet shotguns.

After tests and trials, in January 1979, TOZ-57K и TOZ-57T shotguns were shown at VDNKh exhibition in Moscow and Tula Arms Plant began the serial production of these shotguns. In summer 1981, the price of one standard TOZ-57K (or TOZ-57T) shotgun was 640 roubles.

At the beginning of 1983, it was proposed to produce versions of IZh-27 and TOZ-57 shotguns with "paradox" rifling for hunting in densely populated areas In February 1983, TOZ-57-12E was presented at the hunting weapons exhibition in Krasnoyarsk.

In April 1987, it was announced that Tula Arms Plant would begin mass production of new TOZ-84 shotgun and this gun will replace in production TOZ-34, TOZ-55 and TOZ-57. After this, production of TOZ-57 was discontinued.

These shotguns were used by Soviet teams in international shooting competitions (incl. the ISSF World Shooting Championships and the Olympic Games).

== Design ==
TOZ-57 is an over and under hammerless shotgun, with one barrel above the other. The design is based on TOZ-34 and TOZ-55 models, but it has different barrels, receiver and trigger mechanism

It was equipped with detachable chrome plated barrels.

TOZ-57 has a walnut shoulder stock and fore-end without sling swivels.

== Variants ==
- TOZ-57 (ТОЗ-57) - hunting and skeet shooting shotgun with 711mm barrels
- TOZ-57K (ТОЗ-57К) - skeet shooting shotgun with 675mm barrels
- TOZ-57K-1S (ТОЗ-57К-1С) - skeet shooting shotgun with 675mm barrels (TOZ-57K with different trigger mechanism)
- TOZ-57T (ТОЗ-57Т) - skeet shooting shotgun with 750mm barrels
- TOZ-57T-1S (ТОЗ-57Т-1С) - skeet shooting shotgun with 750mm barrels (TOZ-57T with different trigger mechanism)
- TOZ-57T-12E (ТОЗ-57Т-12Е) - custom skeet shooting shotgun for the Olympic Games and other international competitions (TOZ-57T variant with special trigger mechanism and special lightweight fore-end)

== Museum exhibits ==
- TOZ-57 shotgun is in collection of Tula State Arms Museum in Tula Kremlin

== Sources ==
- Д. М. Закутский, В. А. Лесников, В. В. Филиппов. Охотничье огнестрельное оружие отечественного производства (1968 - 1986 гг.): учебное пособие. М., ВНИИ МВД СССР, 1988. стр.53-54
- Ружьё двуствольное ТОЗ-57 // Охотничье и спортивное оружие, патроны. М., Внешторгиздат, 1989
- Юрий Максимов. ТОЗ-57. Спортивный потомок ТОЗ-34 // журнал "Охота", № 11 (159), 2011. стр.64-70
- Евгений Копейко. Редкое, но меткое // "Охота и рыбалка - XXI век", № 3, 2017. стр.12-17 - ISSN 1727-5539
