= TOZ-34 =

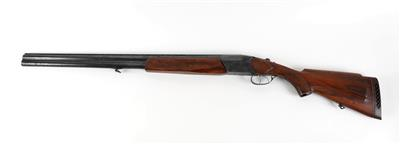
- Type: Double-barreled shotgun
- Place of origin: Soviet Union

Production history
- Designer: N. I. Korovyakov
- Manufacturer: Tula Arms Plant
- Produced: 1964

Specifications
- Mass: 3.0 - 3.3 kg
- Length: 1160mm
- Barrel length: 711mm
- Caliber: 12, 20, 28 and 32 gauge
- Action: Break action
- Rate of fire: Variable
- Sights: Iron sights

The TOZ-34 (Russian: ТОЗ-34) is a Soviet double-barreled shotgun.

== History ==
The TOZ-34 is produced and sold by Tulsky Oruzheiny Zavod since 1964. In 1965, the shotgun was awarded the golden medal of the Leipzig Trade Fair.

In 1967, the price of one standard TOZ-34 was 150 - 160 roubles. Also, since 1960s these shotguns were sold to foreign countries.

In 1970, TOZ-34 and TOZ-34E received the State quality mark of the USSR. In May 1972, the shotgun was awarded the golden medal in Paris.

In 1974, the first experimental 28 and 32 gauge TOZ-34 shotguns were made. After all tests and trials were completed, they were officially presented at exhibitions in Petrozavodsk and Yakutsk in 1976. Since autumn 1976, Tula Arms Plant began serial production of 28 gauge TOZ-34 shotguns.

In 1977, TOZ-34 and TOZ-34E were among the ten most common hunting shotguns in the Soviet Union.

Since 1982 began the production of combination guns based on TOZ-34 design (TOZ-34-5,6/20 and TOZ-34-5,6/28), although only a small number of them was made and sold to hunters until July 1987.

In 1985, IZh-27 and TOZ-34 were the most common hunting shotguns in the Soviet Union.

In April 1987, it was announced that Tula Arms Plant would begin mass production of the new TOZ-84 shotgun and this gun will replace in production TOZ-34, TOZ-55 and TOZ-57. However, after the fall of the Soviet Union and the 1990s economic crisis in the Russian Federation, TOZ decided to discontinue production of TOZ-84 and to continue production of TOZ-34.

In 1990s, the prices of firearms increased. In September 1994, the cost of a one new TOZ-34 shotgun was from 430 thousand roubles to 1.4 million roubles.

More than one million TOZ-34 shotguns have been made.

== Design ==
The TOZ-34 is an over and under hammerless smoothbore shotgun, with one barrel above the other. The barrels are chrome-plated and have chokes at the muzzle end.

Soviet TOZ-34 have a walnut, birch or beech stock and fore-end.

TOZ-34-5,6/20 and TOZ-34-5,6/28 may be equipped with PO-2,5x20 (ПО-2,5х20) optical sight or PO-1 (ПО-1) optical sight

== Variants ==
- TOZ-34 (ТОЗ-34) - standard variant, 3.15 kg
- TOZ-34E (ТОЗ-34Е) - variant with ejector, since 1968, 3.2 kg
- TOZ-34ER (ТОЗ-34ЕР) - TOZ-34E with rubber recoil pad on its shoulder stock
- TOZ-34R (ТОЗ-34Р) - TOZ-34 with rubber recoil pad on its shoulder stock
- TOZ-34-5,6/20 (ТОЗ-34-5,6/20) - over/under combination gun with a rifled .22 LR barrel over a 20 gauge smoothbore barrel. It was announced in March 1980
- TOZ-34-5,6/28 (ТОЗ-34-5,6/28) - over/under combination gun with a rifled .22 LR barrel over a 28 gauge smoothbore barrel The first test prototype was built in 1980
- TOZ-34-1 (ТОЗ-34-1) - single-shot shotgun, since 1995

== Users ==
- USSR - was allowed as civilian hunting weapon
- Austria - unknown number of shotguns were sold as civilian hunting weapon
- Belarus - is allowed as civilian hunting weapon
- Moldova - is allowed as civilian hunting weapon
- Poland
- Russian Federation - they were on the territory of RSFSR in Soviet times, now they are allowed as civilian hunting weapon
- Sweden
- West Germany
- Yugoslavia

== Museum exhibits ==
- TOZ-34 and TOZ-34E shotguns are in collection of Tula State Arms Museum in Tula Kremlin

== Criminal use ==
- A sawn-off TOZ-34 was one of the weapons used by Anatoly Onoprienko during his 7-year killing spree
- A 12-gauge TOZ-34 was the firearm allegedly used by vehicle repair and maintenance student Ilya O. during the 2026 Anapa college shooting

== Sources ==
- Э. Штейнгольд. Разборка ружья ТОЗ-34 // журнал «Охота и охотничье хозяйство», No. 1, 1972. стр.38-39
- Отечественное охотничье оружие. ТОЗ-34 // журнал «Охота и охотничье хозяйство», No. 2, 1981. стр.21
- Г. Коновалов. ТОЗ-34 в эксплуатации // журнал «Охота и охотничье хозяйство», No. 6, 1985. стр.20-21
- Николай Аксенов. 30 лет тульской тридцатьчетверке // журнал «Охота», No. 11-12, 1999
- А. В. Кузьминский. Оружие для охотника: практическое пособие / под общ. ред. А. Е. Тараса М., ООО «Издательство АСТ», 2002. стр.146-150
- Охотничье ружьё ТОЗ-34 // В. Н. Шунков. Охотничьи ружья России. М., ЭКСМО, 2010. стр.190
