= List of Changes =

The List of Changes was a series of instructions and specifications issued by the War Office relating to the stores and equipment issued by the British Government to the armed forces. Originally named List of Changes in Artillery Matériel, Small Arms, Accoutrements and other Military Stores which have been Approved and Sealed; With Instructions Relating Thereto, in the late 1860s it became List of Changes in Artillery Matériel, Small Arms and other Military Stores which have been Approved and Sealed; With Instructions Relating Thereto and then, in 1872, List of Changes in War Matériel and of Patterns of Military Stores which have been Approved and Sealed; With Instructions Relating Thereto. For convenience, it is usually referred to simply as the List of Changes or L.o.C.

Appearing first in May 1860, it was issued irregularly until March 1868, after which it was published monthly in the Army Circular (from January 1888 in its successor, Army Orders) by Her Majesty's Stationery Office, on the first day of the month until August 1919 and on the last day of the month thereafter. This date of publication was generally the official date of introduction (or designation as obsolete) of any item of military stores.

Each change consisted of a section number (§, plural §§), the item(s) of equipment to which the change referred, the date of acceptance by the War Office, and the instruction or procedure specified to be carried out. Individual changes might have more than one date of acceptance if more than one item was laid down in that section. The date of acceptance might precede the date of publication by some considerable time, on occasion a matter of years. For example, the Carrier, hand grenades was originally approved by the War Office on 23 March 1916, but was not listed until §20298 was published on 1 April 1918. After 1891, a letter was added when necessary to indicate whether the instruction applied to land (L) or naval (N) services, or was common to both (C ). In 1918, on the formation of the Royal Air Force, the letter 'A' was added to refer to air services.

The original series ran from §1 published in 1860 to §26231 in December 1923. From January 1924 a second series, prefixed with the letter 'A', ran, beginning with §A 1. A 'B' series followed from 1936, with a subsequent 'C' and a short 'D' series continuing into the early 1960s.

The scope of the list encompassed, amongst other things, the introduction and specifications of new equipment, the modification, care and maintenance of existing equipment, and the withdrawal of obsolete items. It covered virtually every item purchased by, manufactured for or issued by the British armed forces, ranging from artillery pieces, via humane killers to chamber pots. Locally purchased items were not listed. Some equipment which would be expected to have appeared did not (for example, the introduction of the Martini-Metford rifles, although the introductions of the various marks of Martini-Metford carbine are listed). Similarly, some items that are listed were never issued.

The List of Changes did not cover officers' uniforms, accoutrements or side-arms because equipping himself with these was the responsibility of the officer himself and not the Government. For example, he could purchase his sword from the manufacturer or military clothier of his choice, so long as the sword conformed to the current Dress Regulations. (Note: He, and now she, can still do so, although the number of suppliers is now very limited.) Similarly, officers were required to buy their own side-arm (from a military outfitter, gunsmith or the Government) and, until the latter stages of the Great War, could carry any weapon that would fire standard government ammunition. (Note: Even this relatively lax restriction was ignored by a number of officers, notably including Winston Churchill, who favoured the Mauser C96 during the Boer War.) (From 1900, officers were recommended to purchase the Webley revolver. On the outbreak of war in 1914, virtually all the output of the British arms industry was purchased by the Government, making it difficult for officers to obtain pistols from other sources. (Note: There is the strong suggestion that those pistols that did come onto the private market had been manufactured for Government contracts and had failed inspection.) Finally, from May 1917, officers were required to buy a standard revolver from the Government and purchase from private sources was forbidden.)

== Bibliography ==
- Barthorp, Michael (1988). The British Army on Campaign (4): 1882-1902. Oxford: Osprey Publishing. ISBN 0-85045-849-8. OCLC 60062251.
- Laband, John (2009). Historical Dictionary of the Zulu Wars. Lanham MD: Scarecrow Press. ISBN 0-8108-6300-6. OCLC 434042311.
- Maze, Robert (2012). The Webley Service Revolver. Oxford: Osprey Publishing. ISBN 9781849088039. OCLC 769427418.
- Skennerton, Ian D., ed. (1977–1998). List of Changes in British War Material in Relation to Edged Weapons, Firearms and Associated Ammunition and Accoutrements. Margate, QLD, Australia: Ian D. Skennerton.
  - 1860–1886. Vol. 1. 1979. ISBN 0-9597438-3-9. OCLC 29014650.
  - 1886–1900. Vol. 2. 1977. ISBN 0-9597438-4-7. OCLC 27623326.
  - 1900–1910. Vol. 3. 1987. ISBN 0-9597438-5-5.
  - 1910–1918. Vol. 4. 1993.
  - 1918–1926. Vol. 5. 1998.
- Thomas, David (2010). The Pistol in British Military Service during the Great War (MA). University of Birmingham.
