= Nicolas-Noël Boutet =

French gunsmith and bladesmith

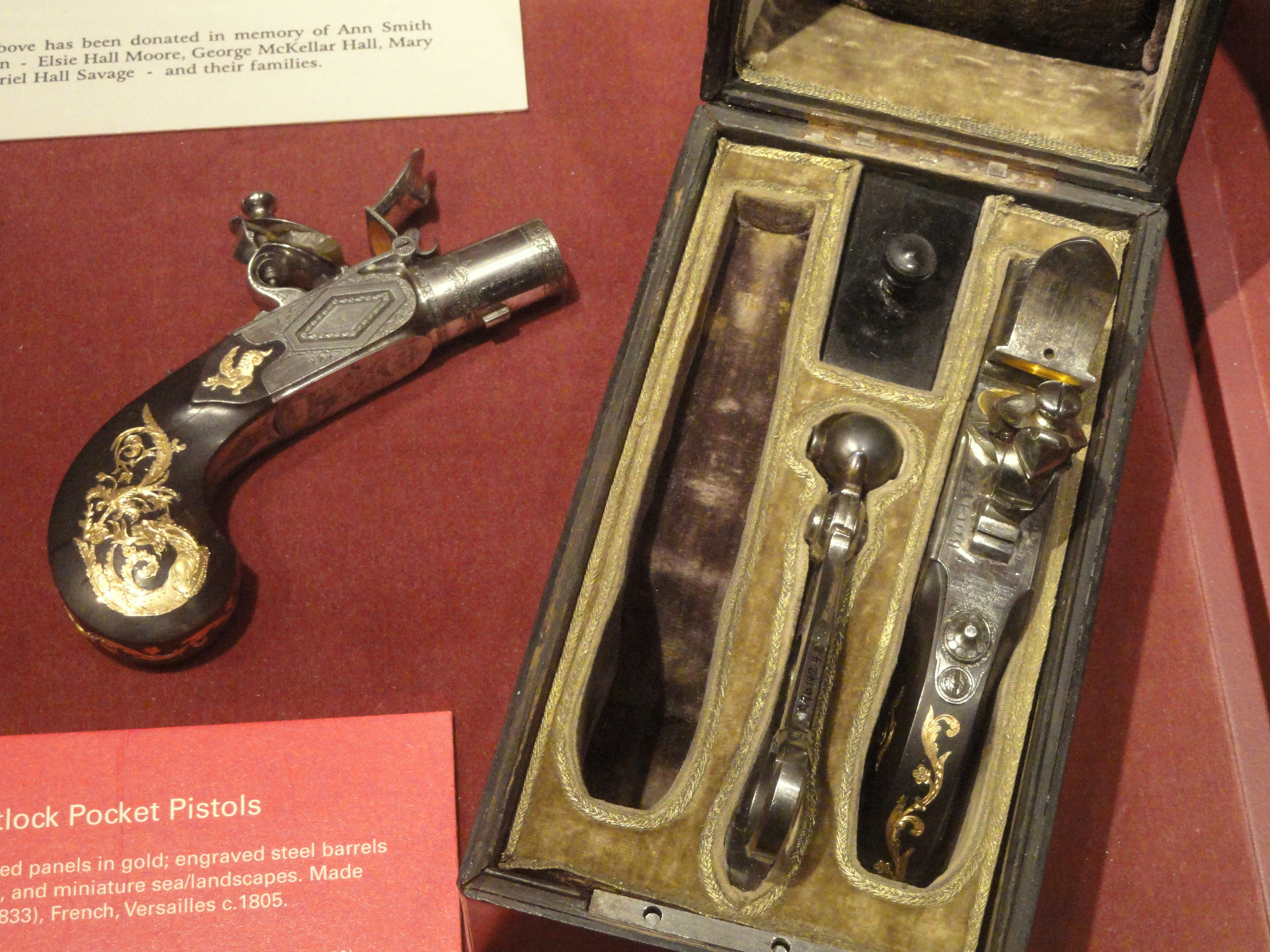
A case with a pair of flintlock pocket pistols with ebony grips and engraved steel barrels, c. 1805

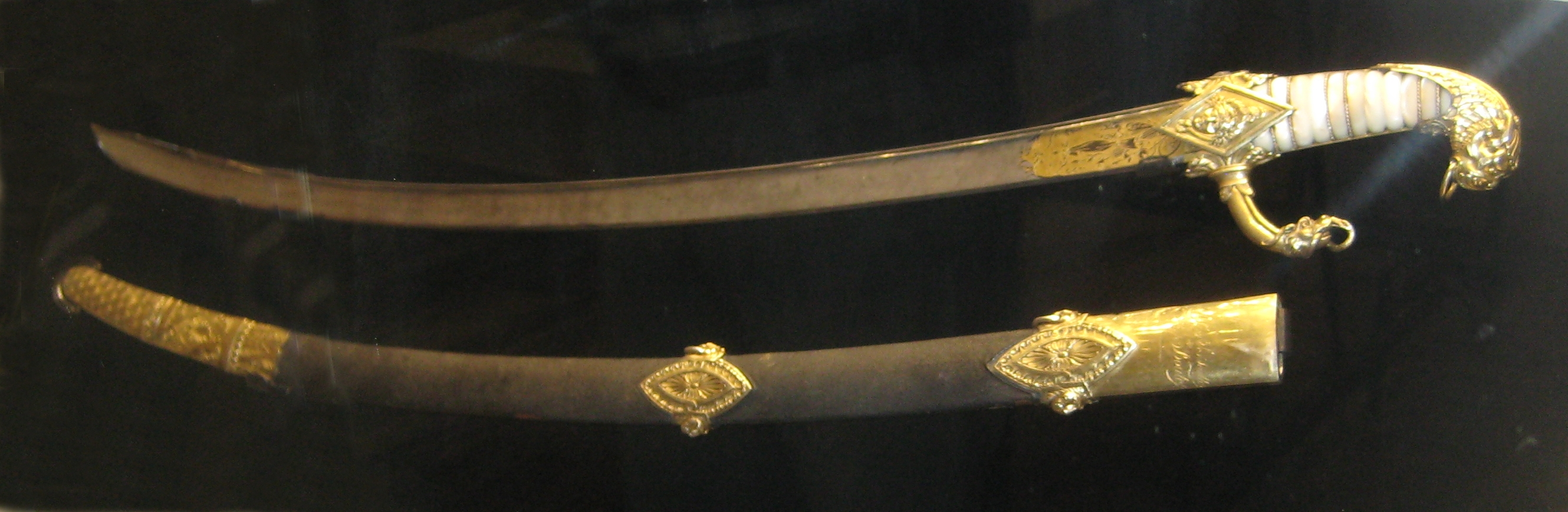
Napoléon Bonaparte's sabre by Nicolas-Noël Boutet, presented in 1799

Nicolas-Noël Boutet (31 August 1761 – 1833) was a French gunsmith and bladesmith who was director of the Versailles state arms factory. More than 600,000 weapons were produced under his directorship.

== Biography ==
Boutet was born in Paris, the son of the royal gunsmith Noël Boutet, and became his father's assistant. In 1788, he married Leonie-Emilie Desainte, the daughter of his father's colleague, which gave him an even better position at court and the title of "gunmaker-in-ordinary" to King Louis XVI.

During the revolution he worked for Napoleon as director of the state arms manufactory.

He died in Paris.

== See also ==
- Flintlock
- Napoleonic weaponry and warfare
- W. W. Greener

== Bibliography ==
- Nicolas-Noël Boutet on American Society of Arms Collectors
