= TOZ-250 =

- Type: Combination gun
- Place of origin: USSR

Production history
- Manufacturer: Tula Arms Plant
- Produced: 1960s

Specifications
- Mass: 2.9 - 3.0 kg
- Length: 1125 - 1150mm
- Barrel length: 625 - 630mm
- Caliber: 16 gauge.22 LR
- Rate of fire: variable
- Feed system: 8-round detachable box magazine
- Sights: iron sights

The TOZ-250 (ТОЗ-250) is a Soviet double-barreled combination gun.

== History ==
On March 17, 1958, gunsmith designers K. I. Shekhvatov (К. И. Шехватов) and V. L. Chernopyatov (В. Л. Чернопятов) submitted to the Committee on Inventions and Discoveries of the Council of Ministers of the Soviet Union an application for the invention of a universal double-barreled combination gun for small and medium-sized game hunting.

In the spring of 1965, information about the TOZ-250 was published. In August 1965 the public learned about preparations for the production of the first batch of guns of this model at the Tula Arms Plant (the cost of the gun at that time was estimated at 90-100 roubles).

Later, the decision to manufacture TOZ-250 was cancelled and serial production of this gun has not been started.

== Design ==
TOZ-250 is an over and under hammerless gun, with one barrel above the other. Both barrels are detachable.

It was a semi-automatic weapon (16/70 gauge shotgun and .22 LR carbine equipped with detachable box magazine).

To reduce the weight of the gun, the TOZ-250 receiver was made of light alloy, and its forearm, shoulder stock and trigger guard were made of plastic.

== Variants ==
- TOZ-250-5,6/16 (ТОЗ-250-5,6/16) - the only known version
