= TOZ-87 =

- Type: Semi-automatic shotgun
- Place of origin: USSR

Production history
- Designer: N. V. Babanin
- Designed: 1978
- Manufacturer: TsKIB SOO; Tula Arms Plant
- Produced: since 1987

Specifications
- Mass: 3.2 kg
- Length: 1240mm
- Barrel length: 711mm
- Width: 60
- Height: 200
- Cartridge: 12/70
- Caliber: 12 gauge
- Feed system: four round tubular magazine, plus 1 in the chamber
- Sights: iron sights

The TOZ-87 (ТОЗ-87) is a Soviet gas-operated semi-automatic shotgun.

== History ==
The shotgun MTs 24-12 was designed in 1978-1987 in TsKIB SOO, as a successor to the MTs 21-12 (the first Soviet semi-automatic shotgun), under the leadership of N. V. Babanin. In 1987 it was renamed to TOZ-87 and Tula Arms Plant began serial production of the shotgun.

After the fall of the Soviet Union due to the economic crisis in Russian Federation in the 1990s, the prices of firearms increased. In September 1994, the cost of one new standard serial TOZ-87 shotgun was from 970 thousand rubles to 1.5 million rubles.

The TOZ-87 led to the development of the pump-action TOZ-194 in 1994.

== Design ==
TOZ-87 is a smoothbore shotgun.

It has a beech or walnut fore-end and shoulder stock with rubber recoil pad on it.

== Variants ==
- TOZ-87-01 (ТОЗ-87-01), also known as MTs 24-12 (МЦ 24-12) - the first version with 711mm barrel, wooden stock and wooden fore-end
- TOZ-87-02 (ТОЗ-87-02) and TOZ-87-03 (ТОЗ-87-03) - with 660mm barrel and interchangeable detachable chokes
- TOZ-87-04 (ТОЗ-87-04) and TOZ-87-05 (ТОЗ-87-05) - with 540mm barrel, 3.1 kg
- TOZ-187 - the second version, with 540mm barrel, plastic folding stock and plastic fore-end, 3.0 kg
- TOZ-187-01 (ТОЗ-187-01)
- TOZ-88 - the last version with 711mm barrel, 3.3 kg
- TOZ-87-4M and TOZ-87-5M - TOZ-87-04 & TOZ-87-05 models with 54 cm barrels
- TOZ-87-06 - rifled slug barrel that can fire Paradox slugs.

== Users ==
- Soviet Union
- Belarus - is allowed as civilian hunting weapon
- Kazakhstan - is allowed as civilian hunting weapon
- Russian Federation - is allowed as civilian hunting weapon

== Sources ==
- Николай Аксенов. А с чем на охоту? // журнал "Техника молодёжи", № 12, 1995. стр.40-43
- ТОЗ-87 // журнал "Оружие и охота", № 7, 2002
- Охотничье ружьё ТОЗ-87 // В. Н. Шунков. Охотничьи ружья России. М., ЭКСМО, 2010. стр.203
- Виктор Рон. Восемьдесят седьмое одноствольное самозарядное // журнал "Оружие", № 9, 2015. стр.63-64 - ISSN 1728-9203
