= Korovin pistol =

TK pistol
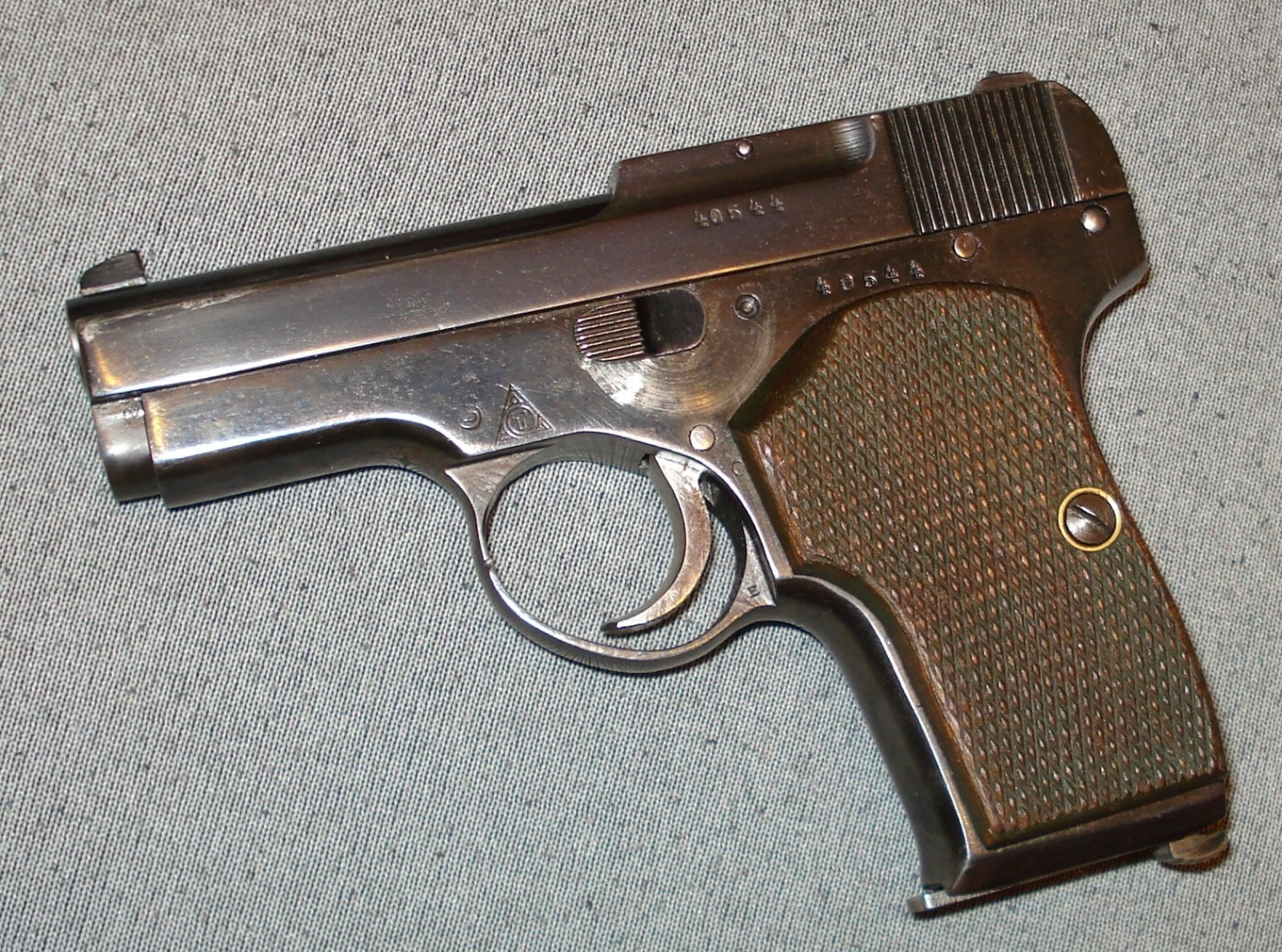
- TK pistol
- Type: Semi-automatic pistol
- Place of origin: Soviet Union

Service history
- In service: 1926–1950s
- Used by: NKVD; Red Army; Gosbank
- Wars: World War II

Production history
- Designer: S.A. Korovin
- Designed: 1925–1926
- Manufacturer: Tula Arms Plant
- Produced: 1926–1935

Specifications
- Mass: 423 g (14.9 oz)
- Length: 127 mm (5.0 in)
- Barrel length: 67.5 mm (2.7 in)
- Width: 24 mm (0.945 in)
- Height: 98 mm (3.9 in)
- Cartridge: 6.35x15.5 mm SR
- Action: Type: single-action semi-automatic pistol
- Muzzle velocity: 228 m/s (748 ft/s)
- Feed system: 8-round detachable box magazine

The Korovin pistol (Пистолет Коровина, Тульский Коровин (ТК), GAU Index 56-A-112) is regarded as the first Soviet semi-automatic pistol.

== History ==
Sergey Korovin designed the first 7.65 mm caliber military pistol around 1922, while working at the famous Tula arms factory TOZ. However, this model proved too complex and difficult. But in 1925 the sport society Dinamo placed an order for a 6.35 mm pocket pistol for sports and civic needs. By 1926, Korovin completed development of a model, and at the end of that year, TOZ began its release.

The following year the gun was approved for use, having received the official title of «Pistol TK Model 1926». The gun was not intended for the army, and it was considered a "civilian weapon". It was used by NKVD operatives, militsiya, senior officers of the Red Army and senior government or party officials. TKs were often used as gifts or awards.

Some TK pistols remained in offices of the State Labor Savings Banks System of the USSR even after the end of the Great Patriotic War.

== Construction ==
The pistol is of simple blowback type. A safety is located on the left side of the frame above the trigger; the magazine catch is located at the bottom of the grip.

The grip panels came in two types: plastic with the TOZ logo, or wooden. Wooden grips came in two versions: checkered or with larger vertical grooves. Until the early 1930s grips were secured with screws, later with spring latches.

== Ammo ==
The Korovin was developed for the .25 ACP cartridge of J.M.Browning design. The official designation of the cartridge in Soviet Russia were: 6.35-mm pistol cartridge 57-N-112 (Browning) - 6,35-мм пистолетный патрон 57-Н-112 (Браунинга), where 57-Н-112 is ГАУ/GAU index for product. Some Russian sources mention the use of a more powerful cartridge in the gun, which is a copied mistake. According to GAU documents the standard only Browning 6,35 mm cartridges produced in the USSR, since 1934, when the TK pistol production was already ended.

== In popular culture ==
The Korovin is mentioned in Len Deighton's spy novel Billion Dollar Brain when Harvey Newbegin is giving Ralph Pike the equipment needed for his mission in Russia. It is referred to as "the little 6.35-mm. Tula-Korovin automatic that the Russians used to call 'the nurses' gun'".

== See also ==
- List of Russian weaponry
