= TOZ-106 =

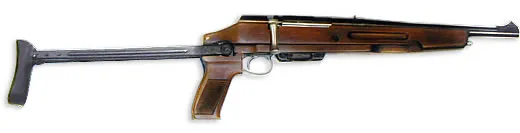
- Type: Bolt-action Shotgun
- Place of origin: Russia

Production history
- Designer: Tulsky Oruzheiny Zavod
- Manufacturer: Tulsky Oruzheiny Zavod
- Produced: 1993 -

Specifications
- Mass: 2.5 kg
- Length: 530/810mm (stock folded/open)
- Barrel length: 295mm
- Width: 70mm
- Height: 170mm
- Cartridge: 20 gauge
- Action: bolt action
- Feed system: 2/4 round box magazine
- Sights: iron sights

The TOZ-106 is a small, lightweight bolt-action shotgun produced and sold by Tulsky Oruzheiny Zavod.

== Design ==
This is a compact version of Soviet MTs 20-01 hunting shotgun.

It features a metal stock that folds underneath the weapon in order to make it more compact, and a pistol grip. The rest of the stock is wooden. This shotgun was officially marketed as a hunting shotgun, but became popular among farmers, adventurers, travelers, campers, truck drivers and other people who needed a self-defense weapon for use in the countryside or wilderness. Illegal sawn-off versions of Soviet shotguns historically earned the name "Death of a collective farm chairman" (rus."Смерть председателя") hinting at their possible use, and TOZ-106 naturally inherited the name. It received an indifferent welcome among hunters, though it is somewhat popular for finishing wounded game.

== Users ==
- Belarus - is allowed as civilian hunting weapon
- Kazakhstan - used in private security companies
- Russian Federation - is allowed as civilian hunting weapon

== Sources ==
- А. И. Благовестов. То, из чего стреляют в СНГ: Справочник стрелкового оружия. / под. общ. ред. А. Е. Тараса. Минск, «Харвест», 2000. стр.418-419
- А. В. Кузьминский. Оружие для охотника: практическое пособие / под общ. ред. А. Е. Тараса М., ООО «Издательство АСТ», 2002. стр.228-229
