= TOZ-28 =

- Type: drilling
- Place of origin: USSR

Production history
- Designer: G. P. Chetverikova
- Manufacturer: Tula Arms Plant

Specifications
- Mass: 3.1 - 3.3 kg
- Barrel length: 600mm
- Caliber: 20 gauge 7.62×38mmR; 6.5×38mmR
- Action: Break action
- Rate of fire: variable
- Sights: iron sights

The TOZ-28 (ТОЗ-28) is a Soviet hunting combination gun.

== History ==
The gun was designed by G. P. Chetverikova (Г. П. Четверикова) in early 1960s.

Since 1963 began the production of this shotgun by Tula Arms Plant. In 1963-1964 it was shown at VDNKh exhibition in Moscow. In 1965, this gun was included in the list of firearms offered for export to other countries.

On December 13, 1996, president of the Russian Federation B. N. Yeltsin signed the federal law № 150, which entered into force on July 1, 1997. In accordance with this law, possession of civilian firearms chambered for handgun ammunition was prohibited. As a result, since July 1, 1997, all TOZ-28 guns were banned on the territory of the Russian Federation and they had to be handed over to governmental law enforcement agencies for destruction.

== Design ==
TOZ-28 is a combination gun, with one rifled barrel under two other.

- smoothbore barrels are chambered for standard 20/70 mm R shotgun shells.
- a rifled barrel was chambered for 7.62×38mmR round or special 6.5×38mmR round

It is equipped with extractor.

All guns have a birch shoulder stock (with or without cheekpiece) and fore-end.

== Museum exhibits ==
- TOZ-28 shotgun was in collection of Tula State Arms Museum in Tula Kremlin

== Sources ==
- ТОЗ-28 // История Тульского оружейного завода, 1712 - 1972. М., "Мысль", 1973. стр.484
- Виктор Рон. Тройник от ТОЗа // журнал "Оружие", № 7, 2017. стр.64 - ISSN 1728-9203
