= TKB-010 =

TKB-09
- Type: Assault rifle
- Place of origin: Soviet Union

Production history
- Designer: German A. Korobov
- Manufacturer: Tula Arms Plant

Specifications
- Mass: 2.48 kg w. empty magazine
- Length: 860 mm
- Barrel length: 405 mm
- Cartridge: 5.45×39mm (TKB-09); 7.62×39mm (TKB-010)
- Action: Delayed blowback
- Rate of fire: 800-850 rpm
- Muzzle velocity: 890 m/s
- Feed system: 30 round box magazine
- Sights: Iron

The TKB-09 (ТКБ-09) was a Soviet delayed blowback assault rifle chambered in 5.45×39mm. It used a bolt attached to a spring in a tube above the barrel. The TKB-09 was intended to force the weight forward as means of increasing accuracy. TKB-010 was the variant chambered in 7.62×39mm.
