= Lasky, Ukraine =

Lasky
- Village
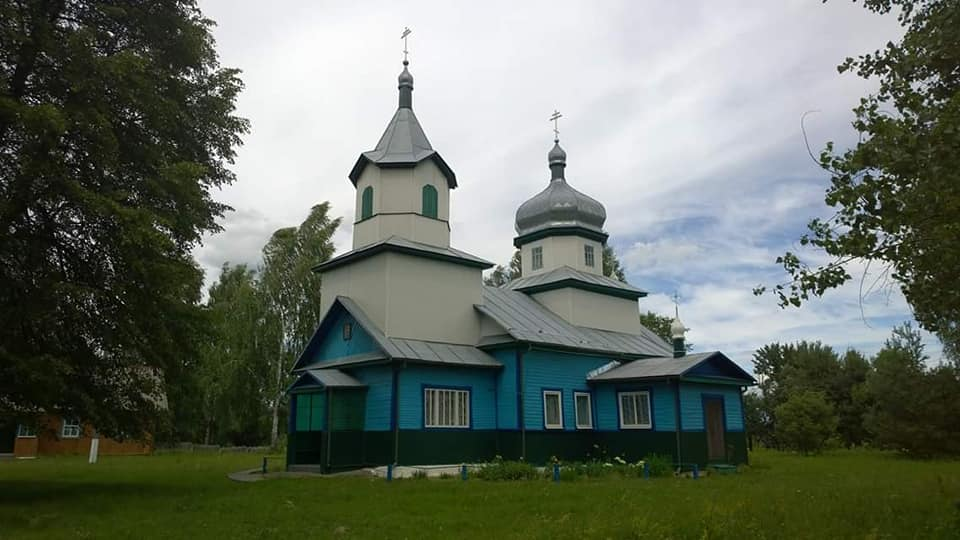
- The Church of the Holy Trinity in Lasky

- Location within Zhytomyr Oblast Location within Ukraine
- Country: Ukraine
- Oblast: Zhytomyr Oblast
- Raion: Korosten
- Population: 709

Lasky (Ukrainian: Ласки) is a Ukrainian village in the Korosten Raion (district) of Zhytomyr Oblast (province).

Lasky was previously located in Narodychi Raion until was abolished on 18 July 2020 as part of the administrative reform of Ukraine, which reduced the number of raions of Zhytomyr Oblast to four. The area of Narodychi Raion was merged into Korosten Raion.

== Notable people ==
- Anatoly Onoprienko, serial/mass murderer
