= William Greener =

British gunmaker (1806–1869)

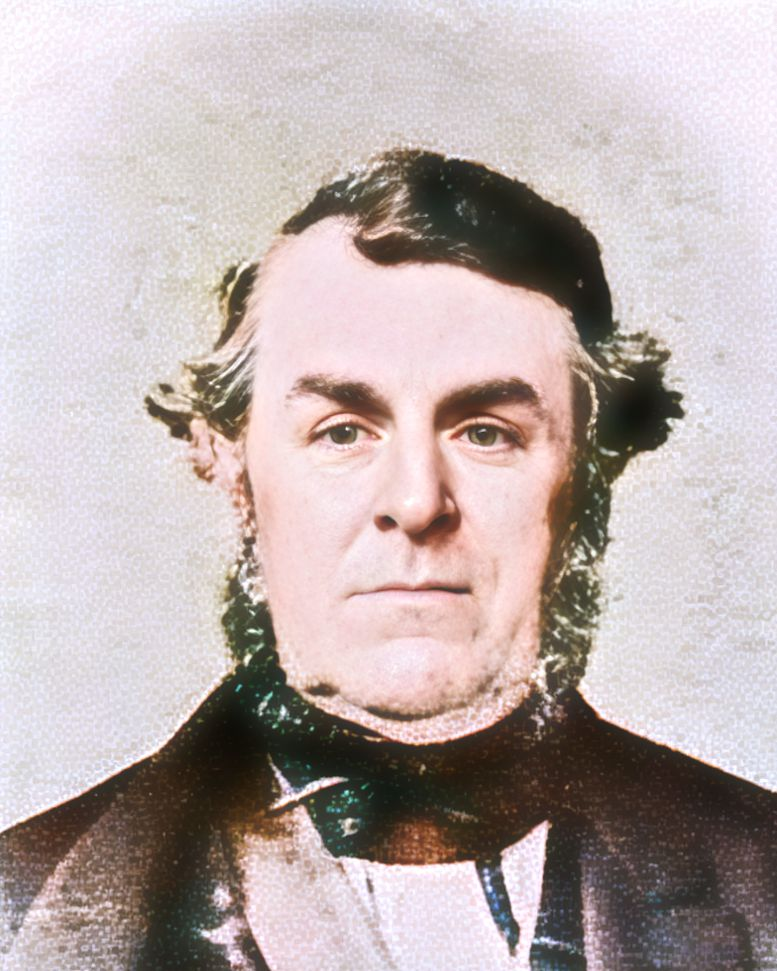

William Greener (1806–1869) was an English inventor and gunmaker. He developed a self-expanding bullet in 1835, an electric lamp in 1846 (patent specification 11076 of that year) some 33 years before Thomas Edison's patent in 1879. William Greener also invented the percussion system for firing cannon, made improvements to the miner's safety lamp and won a prize for designing a mechanical device by which four gates at railway/road level crossings could be opened or closed simultaneously. He also invented a self-righting lifeboat, which was exhibited with a rocket gun and several of his famous percussion muzzle-loading shotguns and rifles at the Great Exhibition of 1851, where he was awarded a gold medal.

The Greener bullet had a hollow base which was fitted with a plug which forced the base of the bullet to expand and catch the rifling. This allowed the bullet to fit easily into the muzzle of the rifle so that it could be easily loaded, but then expand upon firing so that as little of the explosion as possible leaked out the muzzle. Thus the bullet's velocity was not damped. Tests proved that Greener's bullet was extremely effective but it was rejected because, being two parts, it was judged too complicated to produce. The Minié ball, developed in 1847 by Claude-Étienne Minié, was based on Greener's ideas.

Greener was born in Felling, County Durham, England. He died in 1869. His son, William Wellington Greener (1834-1921) trained under his father but later left to set up an independent firm, which took over most of Greener's business after his death.
