= Museum of hunting and fishing (Moscow) =

Museum in Moscow, Russia

Coordinates: 55.8397°N 37.4886°E

Museum of hunting and fishing (Russian: Музей охоты и рыболовства) is a museum in the north of Moscow near the Vodny Stadion metro station. Opened in 1988 in the building of the Central Hunter and Fisherman's House (Golovinskoye Shosse, 1a), the museum is the country's first museum of its kind. Its exhibition is devoted to the history of hunting and fishing in Russia. The museum is represented by the Russian association of public associations of hunters and fishermen.

== Exposition ==
The museum exhibits taxidermy works by masters N. K. Kazimov and VP Korotkov. There are models of hunting weapons and equipment of the 19th and early 20th century. Among the presented hunting trophies are skins of lynx, wolf, bear, and leopard, as well as fangs of wild boar, elk, maral, saiga, Siberian roe deer, and reindeer. The museum has collected documents on the history of hunting and fishing in Russia, and the history of societies of hunters and fishermen. The museum also tells about the main commercial species of animals, their habitats, reserves, and the work on the restoration of numbers. It contains information about traditional and modern ways of hunting and about amateur fishing. The museum holds the work of animal artists V. Gorbatov, I. Makoveeva, M. Nekrasov, A. Maksimov, as well as a collection of animalistic icons of the biologist V. Flint. In addition, models, stained-glass windows, ancient man's tools, cups, photographs, and objects of applied hunting art are presented. The museum conducts active educational work with the younger generation.

== Sources ==
- Музей и его друзья. Посвящается 25-летию Музея охоты и рыболовства Росохотрыболовсоюза // журнал «Охота и охотничье хозяйство», No. 7, 2013. стp.42-43
