= TOZ-66 =

Double-barreled Soviet shotgun

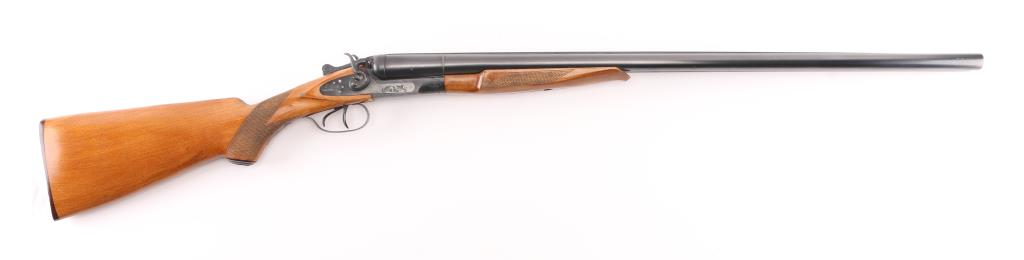
- Type: Double-barreled shotgun
- Place of origin: Soviet Union

Production history
- Manufacturer: Tula Arms Plant
- Produced: 1968-1974

Specifications
- Mass: 3.2kg
- Length: 1150mm
- Barrel length: 710mm
- Cartridge: 12 gauge
- Caliber: 18.5mm
- Action: Break action with hammers
- Rate of fire: Variable
- Sights: Iron sights

The TOZ-66 (Russian: ТОЗ-66) is a Soviet double-barreled shotgun.

== History ==
The TOZ-66 was introduced in 1968 as a rugged, reliable shotgun designed for hunting, particularly in the Soviet Union.

The TOZ-66 is a successor of the TOZ-63, an earlier double-barreled shotgun that featured a similar break-action design but with internal hammers. The TOZ-66, however, stood out because of its external hammers - this feature gave hunters manual control over each barrel’s readiness to fire, making it reliable in operation.

Production of the TOZ-66 continued through the 1970s, but by the late 1970s and early 1980s, more modern designs began to overshadow it. Shotguns with internal hammers and more advanced safety mechanisms became more common, gradually phasing out external hammer designs like the TOZ-66. Though TOZ-66 remained in use for many years after production ceased due to its durability and widespread availability.

== Design ==
The external hammers of the TOZ-66 were part of a design that appealed to hunters - the hammers provided a visual and tactile cue as to whether the gun was ready to fire, which was considered a safer option for those who might need to carry their shotgun loaded but uncocked during long hunting trips. The gun’s double triggers also allowed the shooter to fire each barrel independently, which was ideal for close-quarters combat.
