= William Wellington Greener =

British gunsmith (1834–1921)

- Born: 1834
- Died: 1922 (aged 87–88)
- Occupation: Gunsmith
- Known for: Founder of the W. W. Greener company

William Wellington Greener (1834–1921) was an English gunsmith, the founder of the W. W. Greener company. He was also an author of books on guns, many of which went through multiple editions, most notably The Gun and Its Development (first published 1881; 9th edition 1910; subsequently reprinted 1972, 1989, 2002).

He was the son of the gunsmith William Greener (1806-1869).

== Bibliography ==
- Modern Breech-loaders: Sporting and Military. London: Cassell, Petter and Galpin, 1871.
- Choke-bore Guns, and How to Load for All Kinds of Game. London and New York: Cassell, Petter & Galpin, 1876.
- The Gun and Its Development. London, Paris & New York: Cassell, Petter, Galpin & Co., 1881.
- Modern Shot Guns. London and New York : Cassell, 1888 (2nd ed. 1891)
- The Breechloader and How to Use It. London: Cassell & Co., 1892.
- Sharpshooting for Sport and War. London: R. A. Everett & Co., 1900.
- The British Miniature Rifle. London: Everett & Co., 1908.
- Sharpshooting for War and Defence. London: Simpkin, Marshall & Co., 1914.
