= W. W. Greener =

British gun manufacturer

W. W. Greener Ltd
- Type: Private
- Industry: Firearms
- Founded: 1829
- Founder: William Greener
- Headquarters: Chippenham, United Kingdom
- Area served: Local
- Products: Rifles
- Website: http://www.wwgreener.com/

W.W. Greener is a sporting shotgun and rifle manufacturer from England. The company produced its first firearm in 1829 and is still in business, with a fifth generation Greener serving on its board of directors.

== History ==
The history of W.W. Greener begins in 1829, when William Greener, who had been working in London for Manton, a prominent gun maker, returned to his hometown of Newcastle and founded the W. Greener company. In November 1844, he determined that most of the materials and components he used for gun making came from Birmingham, and his business was being hampered by the distance between the two towns. Hence, he moved his business from Newcastle to Aston New Town, Birmingham.

During the period of 1845-58, W. Greener was appointed to make guns for Prince Albert.

William Wellington Greener erected a factory on "Rifle Hill", Aston, in phases between 1859 and, at the earliest, 1864-5. W. W. Greener started out in one of the live/work courts off Loveday Street (Court 11). The first phase of the factory replaced some of the Court 11 buildings. W. W. Greener expanded the factory northwards in stages, building when land came available through his purchase of buildings in the two adjacent courts.

It was around this time that the company began to really prosper.

Greener was a firm believer in the concept of muzzleloaders and refused to make any breechloaders. Hence, his son, William Wellington Greener, struck out a line of his own (the W.W. Greener company) and produced his first breechloader in 1864. When William Greener died in 1869, the two companies were amalgamated as the W.W. Greener Company, and carried on by William Wellington Greener. William Wellington Greener was responsible for several innovations, as described in the sections below, and it was on the strength of his inventions that the company became famous. Under W.W. Greener, the company established offices in Birmingham, London, Hull, Montreal and New York City.

William Wellington Greener was succeeded by two of his sons, Harry Greener and Charles Greener. Leyton Greener, Harry's son and fourth generation took over as Chairman in 1951 and today the company has a fifth generation, Graham Greener, as one of its directors.

== Production ==
Production of Greener weapons started in 1829, when W. Greener began manufacturing his muzzleloaders. W. Greener was the first to discard vent holes in breeches. He was also instrumental in improving the hardness and quality of barrels, by using more steel in their manufacture. He also improved the Harpoon Gun and his model was the one adopted by the Scottish Fisheries, and is still in use today. His greatest innovation was the invention of the expanding rifle bullet.

In 1845-59, W. Greener was appointed to make sporting guns for the Prince Consort. In the 1851 London Exhibition, the company received the highest award "for guns and barrels perfectly forged and finished". In 1853 and 1855, the company received Silver medals at the New York City and Paris Exhibitions. The company's products were also sold for as much as 75 pounds, in the Southern states of America, before the Civil War.

Since W. Greener did not believe in breechloaders, his son, W.W. Greener started his own factory. In 1864, he produced his first patent, an under-lever pin-fire half-cocking breechloader with a top bolt entering the barrel underneath the top rib.

When W. Greener died in 1869, his son W.W. Greener merged the two companies into one. His next patent was the self-acting striker, followed by a famous cross-bolt mechanism produced as a single top bolt, in 1865. In 1873, this cross-bolt mechanism was combined with the bottom holding down bolts to produce the "Treble Wedge-Fast" breech action. The treble wedge-fast was one of the strongest breech actions ever invented and was widely copied by other manufacturers, after the patent rights expired.

The introduction of choke boring in 1874 is regarded as W.W. Greener's greatest achievement. It was this invention that made the firm's name famous. A discussion about this is in the section below.

In 1876, the firm introduced the Treble Wedge-Fast Hammerless Gun, otherwise known as the "Facile Princeps". This gun was cocked by the dropping of the barrels. This action was one of the strongest ever produced. The W.W. Greener company restarted production of Facile Princeps guns in 1998.

In 1880, the firm produced a self-acting ejector for its guns, followed by the "Unique" ejector gun. These guns were designed to eject the spent cartridges when the gun was opened. Manufacture of the "Unique" ejectors stopped during the Second World War, and the company has recently begun to manufacture them again.

In 1895, W.W. Greener invented the world's first Humane Killer, a gun designed to kill cattle, sheep, pigs and horses, quickly and easily. This instrument was adopted by the War Office, for use in the Veterinary, Remount and Butchering Departments, and by the Admiralty for its Victualling yards. The instrument was also modified to use .310 caliber cartridges. After several years, the models became obsolete in the 1960s and ammunition for the older models was impossible to obtain. Recently though, the company was asked to manufacture another model and hence, the Humane Killer Mk II was introduced. This new gun fires a .32 ACP round.

== Choke bores ==
The introduction of choke bores was largely responsible for the fame of the W.W. Greener name. The invention of choke boring is usually attributed to American gunsmiths. The first known patents for choke boring were granted to a Mr. Sylvester H. Roper, an American inventor and gunsmith, (U.S. patent 53,881, Improvement In Revolving Fire-Arms, April 10, 1866; and U.S. patent 79,861, Improvements In Detachable Muzzle For Shot-Guns, dated July 14, 1868.) This was followed by a patent claim in London by Mr. Pape, an English Gun maker, whose patent application was six weeks too late to the 1866 Roper patent. Mr. J.W. Long, in his book "American Wildfowling", credits a Mr. Jeremiah Smith of Southfield, Rhode Island, as the gunsmith who first discovered the concept, as far back as 1827.

While American gunsmiths were the pioneers of the choke boring system, they had not really progressed beyond the elementary stage and their guns would lead, throw irregular patterns and not shoot straight.

W.W. Greener's first intimation of the choke formation was derived from instructions given in a customer's letter, in early 1874. The customer's instructions described a choke, but did not give any details on the size or shape, or how it was to be obtained. Hence, W.W. Greener had to conduct many experiments to determine the perfect shape and size of a choke for a given bore. After that, he developed tools to produce the choke bore profile correctly and smoothly. The system of choke boring that he pioneered was so successful that it was later adopted by other manufacturers and hence, some authorities give him the credit for inventing the concept.

In December 1874, the first mention of Greener's choke bore appeared in an article by J.H. Walsh, the Editor of Field magazine. The article mentioned the extraordinary shot pattern that the Greener shotgun could produce. The next issue came with an advertisement from W.W. Greener, stating that the firm would guarantee that their new guns would shoot a closer pattern than any other manufacturer. The advertisement claimed that Greener 12 bores were warranted to shoot an average pattern of 210, when the best 12 bore gun in the London Gun Trial of 1866 could only average 127. Naturally, the advertisement generated considerable controversy, especially from rival manufacturers of cylinder guns, who refused to believe the numbers quoted in the advertisement.

In order to resolve the controversy, the Editors of Field magazine decided to conduct a public trial in 1875. The London Trial of 1875 pitted choke bores and cylinder guns of various manufacturers in four categories—Class 1 (large bores, any boring), Class 2 (Choke bores, 12 gauge), Class 3 (Guns of English boring or Cylinders) and Class 4 (Small gauges, any boring). The choke bored guns performed better than the cylinder guns in all these tests, and W.W. Greener choke bore guns won the class 1, class 2 and class 4 categories. Greener Choke bores also won at the London Gun Trials of 1877 and 1879, and the Chicago Field Gun Trial of 1879. The results of these trials were responsible for making the W.W. Greener name famous.

== Fake Greener guns ==
During the 1880s, as the company became well known, several small manufacturers in Belgium and Australia attempted to manufacture copies of Greener weapons. In several cases, the name was misleadingly similar: Greenen, Horace Greener, Albert Greener, A. Greener, W.H. Greener, A.H. Greener etc. are several examples of names of spurious weapons. Note that J.H. Greener and Albert Greener were two brothers of W W Greener and both brothers also made guns. Most J H Greener and a few Albert Greener guns are genuine.

In other cases, the maker would print "Greener" in bold gilt letters on the top rib and their own name in small characters, elsewhere on the gun. When one of these makers was challenged in Belgian courts, the defence advanced the theory that the weapons were using the Greener cross-bolt system and hence, the larger letters were intended to refer to the system, and not the maker of the weapon.

Due to the large number of forgeries, the W.W. Greener company offers to authenticate genuine Greener weapons for a small fee.

== See also ==
- Gun Quarter, Birmingham
- Nicolas-Noël Boutet

== Bibliography ==
- Teasdale-Buckle, G.T., Experts on Guns and Shooting, Sampson Low, Marston & Co.
- Greener, William Wellington, The Gun and Its Development, Ninth Edition, Bonanza Books NY, 1910
- Greener, Graham N., The Greener Story, Quiller Press, 2000
