= Pryvitne =

Village in Volyn Oblast, Ukraine

Pryvitne Привітне
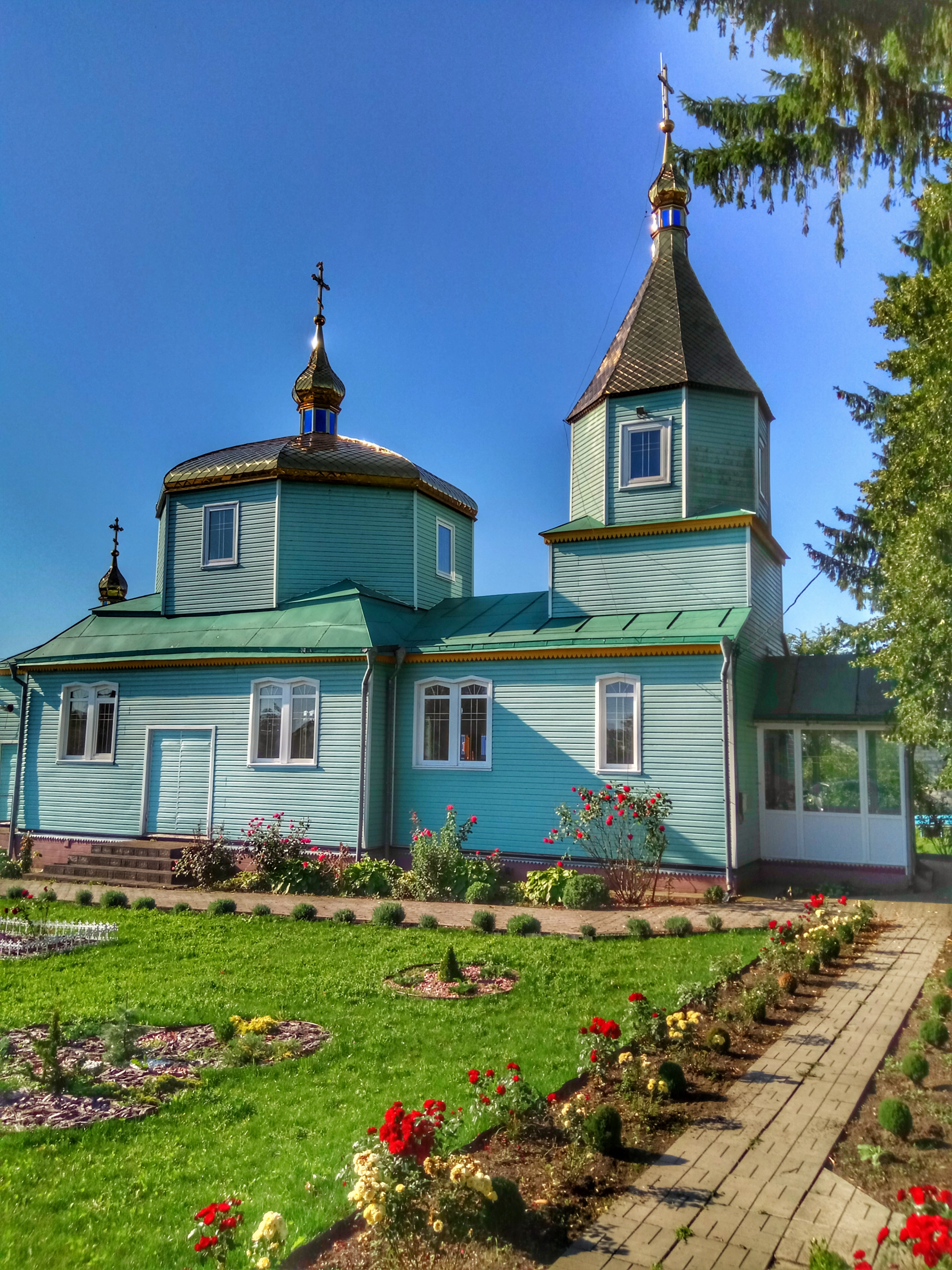

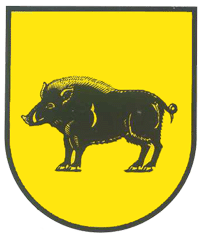
- Coat of arms

- Location within Ukraine
- Coordinates: 50°38′N 24°45′E
- Country: Ukraine
- Oblast: Volyn Oblast
- Raion: Volodymyr Raion

Pryvitne (Ukrainian: Привітне) is a small village in western Ukraine, in the Volodymyr Raion of Volyn Oblast, but was formerly administered within Lokachi Raion. It is located approximately 75 miles northeast of the city of Lviv, Ukraine. In the past, it was a town of Svyniukhy (Ukrainian: Свинюхи, Polish: Świniuchy, Yiddish: סווינעך Svinekh).

== History ==
It was a royal town of the Kingdom of Poland.

During the Polish–Soviet War, on 8 August 1920, it was the place of a battle, in which the Poles defeated the invading Soviets.

=== Judaism in Svyniukhy ===
Jews first settled here in the 16th century. By the year 1897, 629 Jews lived here out of a total of 1,780 people. During World War I, many Jews left the shtetl because of the nearby fighting. In 1921, only 173 Jews were living here.

Due to a high birth rate, as most of the Jewish citizens of Svyniukhy belonged to the orthodox sects of Olyka and Tuczyn Hasidism, the Jewish population grew to 498 by 1936. In July 1941, the Ukrainian local government police persecuted the Jews of Svyniukhy after being ordered to by the Nazi invaders. During October of that year, they were sent to the Lokachi ghetto where they were executed on September 13, 1942. The diary of Michael Diment, the only known survivor of the liquidation of the Jewish population of Svyniukhy is a moving account of the last days of the community. See Michael Diment, The Lone Survivor: A Diary of the Lukacze Ghetto and Svyniukhy, Ukraine (1992), published by the Holocaust Library in New York.

There are known descendants of the Jews of Svyniukhy living in the United States. Specifically, there were former Svyniukhy residents and their descendants who settled in the area of Detroit and Flint, Michigan, along with branches of those families scattered in Pittsburgh PA, Toledo OH, Baltimore, Maryland, and New York City. Evident in its history, the Baltimore community formed a landesmanschaft (organization of Jews from a particular area in Europe), known as the Swiniche Woliner (Volhynya) Benevolent Association, which persists to this day. An extensive family tree of the Schafer family (which comes from Svyniukhy) can be found at http://www.schaferfamily.org. There are also descendants of this family living in Israel.

=== Life in pre-war Svyniukhy ===
Svyniukhy was an old town with a laid-back feel. As typical of the region, homes were decaying rustic whitewashed clay huts lit by kerosene lamps. The village was, of course, centered on trade. Poles, Ukrainians, and Jews alike shared the small town, living together, though with suspicions. Food was cheap, most of the Jews were observant, and basically all of them were below the poverty line. Also, there was no generation gap, as it was such a small, close-knit community. Homes were made, white clay, with thatched roofs.
