= Choke (firearms) =

Tapered constriction of the muzzle on a firearm barrel

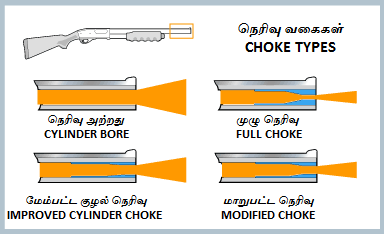
Illustration of the effect that different types of chokes have on the spread ("pattern") of shotgun projectiles

A choke is a tapered constriction of a firearm barrel at its muzzle end. Chokes are most commonly seen on shotguns, but are also used on some rifles, pistols, or even airguns.

Chokes are almost always used with modern hunting and target shotguns to improve performance. Their purpose is to shape the spread of the shot "cloud" or "string" to gain better range and accuracy, and to deliver the optimum pattern of pellet density, for the particular target, depending on its size, range, aspect and whether it is traveling towards, across or away from the shooter. Chokes are implemented as either screw-in chokes, selected for particular applications, or as fixed, permanent chokes, integral to the shotgun barrel.

Chokes may be formed at the time of manufacture either as part of the barrel, by squeezing the end of the bore down over a mandrel, or by threading the barrel and screwing in an interchangeable choke tube. Chokes may also be formed even after a barrel is manufactured by increasing the diameter of the bore inside a barrel, creating what is called a "jug choke", or by installing screw-in chokes within a barrel. However implemented, a choke typically consists of a conical section that smoothly tapers from the bore diameter down to the choke diameter, followed by a cylindrical section of the choke diameter. Briley Manufacturing, one maker of interchangeable shotgun chokes, uses a conical portion about 3 times the bore diameter in length, so that the shot is gradually squeezed down with minimal deformation. The cylindrical section is shorter and usually between 15 and 19 mm (0.6 to 0.75 inches) in diameter.

== Function ==
A choke is designed to alter or shape the distribution of the shot as it leaves the firearm. For shooting most game birds and clay pigeons, a desirable pattern is one that is as large as possible while being dense enough to ensure multiple hits on the target, at a particular range. The choke should be tailored to the range and size of the targets. Shotguns intended for defensive use often have cylinder or improved cylinder chokes for the widest shot pattern at typically short defensive ranges; "cylinder barrels" have no constriction.

A skeet shooter shooting at close crossing targets might use 0.13 mm (0.005 in) of constriction to produce a 75 cm (30 in) diameter pattern at a distance of 20 m (22 yd). A trap shooter shooting at distant targets traveling away from the gun might use 0.75 mm (0.030 in) of constriction to produce a 75 cm (30 in) diameter pattern at 35 m (38 yd). Special chokes for turkey hunting, which requires long range shots at the small head and neck of the bird, can go as high as 1.5 mm (0.059 in).

The use of too much choke and a small pattern increases the difficulty of hitting the target; the use of too little choke produces large patterns with insufficient pellet density to reliably break targets or kill game.

== History ==
As far back as 1787 a Frenchman by the name of M. Magne de Marolles gave an account of choke-boring, though he argued against it.

Some sources state that the first pioneer was a Czech named Dominik Brandejs, who made shotguns with a choke in order to reduce the dispersion of shots, but his design was not popular in the 1820s.

The invention of choke boring is usually attributed to American gunsmiths. J.W. Long, in his book American Wildfowling, credits Jeremiah Smith of Southfield, Rhode Island, as the gunsmith who first discovered the concept, as far back as 1827.

The first known patents for choke boring were granted Sylvester H. Roper, an American inventor and gunsmith. This was followed by a patent claim in London by W.R. Pape, an English gun maker, whose patent application was six weeks too late to the 1866 Roper patent.

While American gunsmiths were the pioneers of the choke boring system, they had not really progressed beyond the elementary stage and their choked shotguns would lead, throw irregular patterns, and not shoot straight.

W. W. Greener's first intimation of the choke formation was derived from instructions given in a customer's letter, in early 1874. The customer's instructions described a choke but did not give any details on the size or shape nor how it was to be obtained. Hence, Greener had to conduct many experiments to determine the perfect shape and size of a choke for a given bore. After that, he developed tools to produce the choke bore profile correctly and smoothly. The system of choke boring that he pioneered was so successful that it was later adopted by other manufacturers and hence, some authorities give him the credit for inventing the concept, since his method became the first repeatable method of choke boring. William Wellington Greener is thus widely credited as being the inventor of the first practical choke, as documented in his classic 1888 publication, The Gun and its Development.

In December 1874, the first mention of Greener's choke bore appeared in an article by J.H. Walsh, the editor of Field magazine. The article mentioned the extraordinary shot pattern that the Greener shotgun could produce. The next issue came with an advertisement from Greener, stating that the firm would guarantee that their new guns would shoot a closer pattern than any other manufacturer. The advertisement claimed that Greener 12 bores were warranted to shoot an average pattern of 210, when the best 12 bore gun in the London Gun Trial of 1866 could only average 127. Naturally, the advertisement generated considerable controversy, especially from rival manufacturers of cylinder guns, who refused to believe the numbers quoted in the advertisement.

To resolve the controversy, the editors of Field magazine decided to conduct a public trial in 1875. The London Trial of 1875 pitted choke bores and cylinder guns of various manufacturers in four categories—Class 1 (large bores, any boring), Class 2 (choke bores, 12 gauge), Class 3 (guns of English boring or cylinders) and Class 4 (small gauges, any boring). The choke bored guns performed better than the cylinder guns in all these tests, and W.W. Greener choke bore guns won the class 1, class 2 and class 4 categories. Greener Choke bores also won at the London Gun Trials of 1877 and 1879, and the Chicago Field Gun Trial of 1879. The results of these trials were responsible for making the W.W. Greener name famous, and for confirming the practical advantage of a repeatable method of controlling the performance of a choke on a shotgun.

== Use in competition ==
The choice of choke type has an impact on performance in shooting competitions. At the Shoot-Off at the 2018 Shotgun World Shoot, U.S. shooter Scott Greene and Russian Roman Anikin both fired their last shots almost simultaneously, but Greene had chosen a more constricted barrel choke. This gave a tighter shot pattern and a greater risk of missing, but ultimately led to his target falling faster to win the Shoot-Off.

== Constriction ==
Greatly exaggerated illustration of different choke constrictions, German names: A: Cylinder (no choke) B: Improved cylinder C: Glocken D: Skeet E: Full (normal) F: Spitzbogen G: Jug H: Paradox

The exit end of a choke is smaller by some dimension than the actual bore of the barrel. This difference in diameter is the amount of constriction. For example, for a 12 gauge, the bore diameter of the barrel is nominally 18.5 mm (0.73 in), although different manufacturers do vary their as-manufactured bore from this diameter slightly. This is commonly called "overbore", when the as-built diameter exceeds the nominal diameter. The advantages touted for "overbore" are a perceived reduction in recoil and a lessened shot deformation for improving shot patterns.

Generally, the constriction ranges for chokes will be 0.00–1.15 mm (0.000–0.045 in), while the constriction for relatively common turkey chokes may be as much as 2.50 mm (0.098 in). Choke is measured experimentally by observing the percentage of pellets in a charge that impact inside a 75 cm circle at 35 m (25 m for "cylinder" and "Skeet"). Although different choke manufacturers have different identification of their chokes, the notches in the chart below are generally accepted. One of the reasons these experiments need to be run is that choke constriction is measured in absolute terms (measurable in inches or millimetres) rather than relative to the barrel (or shot) diameter being choked; a .5 mm choke is unlikely to behave identically in both a 19.7 mm barrel loaded with 2.49 mm shot and a 15.6 mm barrel loaded with 4.57 mm shot.

A common method of expressing the amount of constriction is by "points". A "point" is equivalent to 0.025 mm (0.001 in) of constriction of the inner diameter of a choke. Hence, 40 points of constriction would correspond to a constriction of .040 inches (1.0 millimetre) in the inner diameter of a choke, corresponding to "Extra Full".

Choke (American designation)	Constriction	Percentage of lead shot in 75 cm circle at 35 m (30-inch circle at 40 yards)	Identification (notches)	Identification (British)	Identification (stars) (Spanish shotguns)
Cylinder (no choke)	0.00 mm (0 in)	40% at 35 m (40 yd); 70% at 23 m (25 yd)	IIIII (5 notches)		***** (5 stars)
Skeet 1	0.13 mm (0.005 in)	45% at 35 m (40 yd); 75% at 23 m (25 yd)		1/8	
Improved Cylinder	0.25 mm (0.01 in)	50%	IIII (4 notches)	1/4	**** (4 stars)
Skeet 2 (light Mod.)	0.38 mm (0.015 in)	55%		3/8	
Modified	0.51 mm (0.020 in)	60%	III (3 notches)	1/2	*** (3 stars)
Improved Modified	0.635 mm (0.025 in)	65%	II (2 notches)	3/4	** (2 stars)
Full	0.76 mm (0.030 in)	70%	I (1 notch)	1/1	* (1 star)
Extra Full	1.015 mm (0.040 in)	73%	I (1 notch)		
Turkey	1.145 mm (0.045 in) plus	75% plus	I (1 notch)		

=== Markings ===
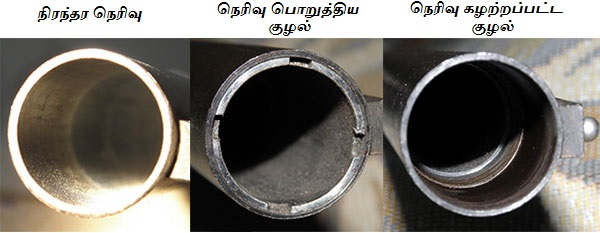
Left: Permanent choke. Center: Replaceable choke inserted into the muzzle. Right: Threaded barrel without choke insert. (For illustration only; a threaded barrel must never be fired without a properly inserted choke tube.)

The marking is usually stamped on the underside of the barrel for older guns without choke tubes, or is spelled out in abbreviated text on the barrel near the gauge marking.

In the case of choke tubes, the amount of choke for each barrel is usually stamped on the side of the choke tube, or there may be thin slots cut in the exposed rim of the tube at the barrel opening with the number of slots corresponding to the number of stars in this table. (The four wider slots present in the exposed rim of the tube are intended for use with a choke wrench, in the event that a choke tube ever becomes stuck in the barrel, and have no relationship to the amount of choke.)

For the case of older, side-by-side, Spanish guns, the choke is often marked on the tang of the barrels, becoming exposed when the wooden forearm is removed, after the double barrels are pivoted off of the break-action, such as when performing a field-stripping and cleaning. The manufacturer's mark, along with the proof marks, and the weight of the barrels in grams, and the proof test pressures are also stamped alongside the choke marking on the tang of the barrels, near where the shells are inserted into the barrels.

In practice, choke tubes tighter than "Full", such as "Turkey", are also commonly marked with but a single thin notch on the end of the tube. Hence, to distinguish between "Full" vs. even tighter chokes, such as "Turkey", it becomes necessary to measure the bore exit diameter of the choke tube to determine precisely which choke type is present among the "Full" and tighter (smaller diameter) chokes.

=== Alternative chokes ===
Other specialized choke tubes exist as well. Some turkey hunting tubes have constrictions greater than "Turkey", or additional features like porting to reduce recoil, or "straight rifling" that is designed to stop any spin that the shot column might acquire when traveling down the barrel. These tubes are often extended tubes, meaning they project beyond the end of the bore, giving more room for things like a longer conical section. Shot spreaders or diffusion chokes work opposite of normal chokes—they are designed to spread the shot more than a cylinder bore, generating wider patterns for very short range use. A basic spreader choke is simply a "choke" with a larger diameter than the barrel; the spreader choke still makes the barrel more restrictive than just having a shorter barrel, but a shorter barrel may not be allowed due to legal restrictions. A number of recent spreader chokes, such as the Briley "Diffusion" line, actually use rifling in the choke to spin the shot slightly, creating a wider spread. The Briley Diffusion uses a 360 mm twist (1:14"), as does the FABARM Lion Paradox shotgun.

Oval chokes, which are designed to provide a shot pattern wider than it is tall, are sometimes found on combat shotguns, primarily those of the Vietnam War era. They were available for aftermarket addition in the 1970s from companies like A & W Engineering. Military versions of the Ithaca 37 with duckbill choke were used in limited numbers during the Vietnam War by US Navy Seals. It arguably increased effectiveness in close range engagements against multiple targets. Two major disadvantages plagued the system. One was erratic patterning. The second was that the shot would spread too quickly providing a very limited effective zone.

Offset chokes, where the pattern is intentionally slightly off of center, are used to change the point of impact. For instance, an offset choke can be used to make a double barrelled shotgun with poorly aligned barrels hit the same spot with both barrels.

For shotguns with fixed chokes integral to the barrel, it is sometimes still possible to change the choke to a tighter choke. This is done by increasing the diameter of the bore inside the barrel for a short length of barrel, while the portion of the barrel and bore nearest the muzzle is left as it was. The effect is to form what is called a "jug choke" or a "reverse choke". This method is sometimes used by gunsmiths to implement a tighter choke on an existing gun without replaceable chokes, and can be done without requiring replacement of a barrel and without installing new screw-in replaceable chokes. Advantages claimed for a "jug choke" include improved patterns, reduction of recoil, and an increase of choke in a shotgun that does not have replaceable choke tubes. When a "jug choke" is implemented in an existing choked barrel, the bore inside the bored-out section of barrel effectively becomes "overbored", and this also typically lessens the amount of shot deformation, thereby increasing the shot pattern density.

== Compatibility chart ==
The following list should only be used as a guide, and there may be exceptions.

Gauge	Choke threads (metric designation)	Choke threads (imperial designation)	Manufacturer and type	Comment
10 ga (19.69 mm)	M22.12×0.794 mm	0.871"-32 TPI	Remington pro-bore	
10 ga (19.69 mm)	M21.97×0.577 mm	0.865"-44 TPI	Tru-Choke	
12 ga (18.53 mm)	M20.62×0.794 mm	0.812"-32 TPI	Winchester Win-choke, Browning Invector, Mossberg Accu-choke, Weatherby IMC, Savage	Note that although Win and Rem-choke have the same thread pitch, their shapes are different.
12 ga (18.53 mm)	M20.62×0.794 mm	0.812"-32 TPI	Remington Rem-choke	Note that although Win-choke and Rem-choke have the same thread pitch, their shape are different.
12 ga (18.53 mm)	M20.83×0.794 mm	0.820"-32 TPI	Browning Invector plus	
12 ga (18.53 mm)	M20.574×1 mm	0.810"-25.4 TPI	Benelli/ Beretta; Krieghoff	
12 ga (18.53 mm)	M20.75×1 mm	0.817"-25.4 TPI	Hastings choke II barrels	
12 ga (18.53 mm)	M22.20×0.794 mm	0.874"-32 TPI	Mossberg Ulti-Mag	
12 ga (18.53 mm)	M20.19×0.577 mm	0.795"-44 TPI	Tru-Choke	
12 ga (18.53 mm)	M19.66×0.577 mm	0.774"-44 TPI	Tru-Choke thinwall	
16 ga (16.83 mm)	M18.24×0.577 mm	0.718"-44 TPI	Tru-Choke	
20 ga (15.63 mm)	M17.45×0.794 mm	0.687"-32 TPI	Winchester Win-choke, Browning Invector, Mossberg Accu-choke, Weatherby IMC, Savage	
20 ga (15.63 mm)	M17.46×0.794 mm	11/16"-32 TPI (0.697"-32 TPI)	Remington Rem-choke	
20 ga (15.63 mm)	M17.15×0.577 mm	0.675"-44 TPI	Tru-Choke	
28 ga (13.97 mm)	M15.57×0.577 mm	0.613"-44 TPI	Tru-Choke	
.410 (10.41 mm)	M12.14×0.577 mm	0.478"-44 TPI	Tru-Choke	

== Steel shot and alternatives ==
Older shotgun barrels and chokes were designed for use with lead shot only. Due to changing worldwide waterfowl hunting law restrictions, the use of lead shot has been banned in many parts of the world by international agreement. The reason is that waterfowl hunting with lead shot was identified as a major cause of lead poisoning in waterfowl, which often feed off the bottom of lakes and wetlands where lead shot collects. In the United States, UK, Canada, and many western European countries (France as of 2006), all shot used for waterfowl must now be non-toxic, and therefore may not contain any lead. One method commonly used to work around this legislative change, at least for hunters with newer shotguns with chokes designed for steel shot, is to use steel shot, but the use of steel shot may damage chokes on older firearms that were designed for use with lead shot only, such as Damascus-barreled shotguns. Most non-toxic shot shells produce higher chamber pressures than lead shot and can severely damage these older shotguns and as a rule of thumb, use a more open choke than one would for lead shells. An example would be an improved cylinder choke will perform like a modified choke when shooting steel or tungsten shells. For such hunters, wishing to continue to use older shotguns with chokes not rated for use with steel shot, the use of bismuth shotshells in the place of lead shotshells is common. Other alternatives to lead shotshells than bismuth also exist that are legal for hunting waterfowl, and which are safe for use with older chokes. Within recent years, several companies have created "heavier than lead" non-toxic shot out of tungsten, bismuth (which is lighter than lead, but reasonably similar), or other elements with a density similar to or greater than lead, and with a shot softness comparable to lead. These shells provide more consistent patterns and greater range than steel shot. They are also generally safe to use in older shotguns with barrels and chokes not rated for use with steel shot, such as for bismuth and tungsten-polymer (although not tungsten-iron) shot. The increase in performance of "heavier than lead" non-toxic shot comes at a higher cost. Boxes of such non-toxic shotshells can cost upwards of $40 (2013) a box for twenty five shells, compared with less than $8 per box (2013) for lead pellet shotshells.

In practice, steel shot patterns as much as two chokes tighter for a given amount of constriction. In other words, a choke that patterns "Modified" with lead or bismuth shot would give a "Full" pattern with steel shot. To avoid excessive wear or grooving from occurring within chokes when shooting steel shot, many manufacturers recommend avoiding shooting steel shot in any chokes marked tighter than "Modified", unless the choke tube is specifically marked as being safe for use with steel shot.

== See also ==
- Slug barrel
- Squeeze bore
