= Tula Arms Plant =

Russian weapons manufacturer

Coordinates: 54°12′02″N 37°36′53.4″E

Imperial Tula Arms Plant

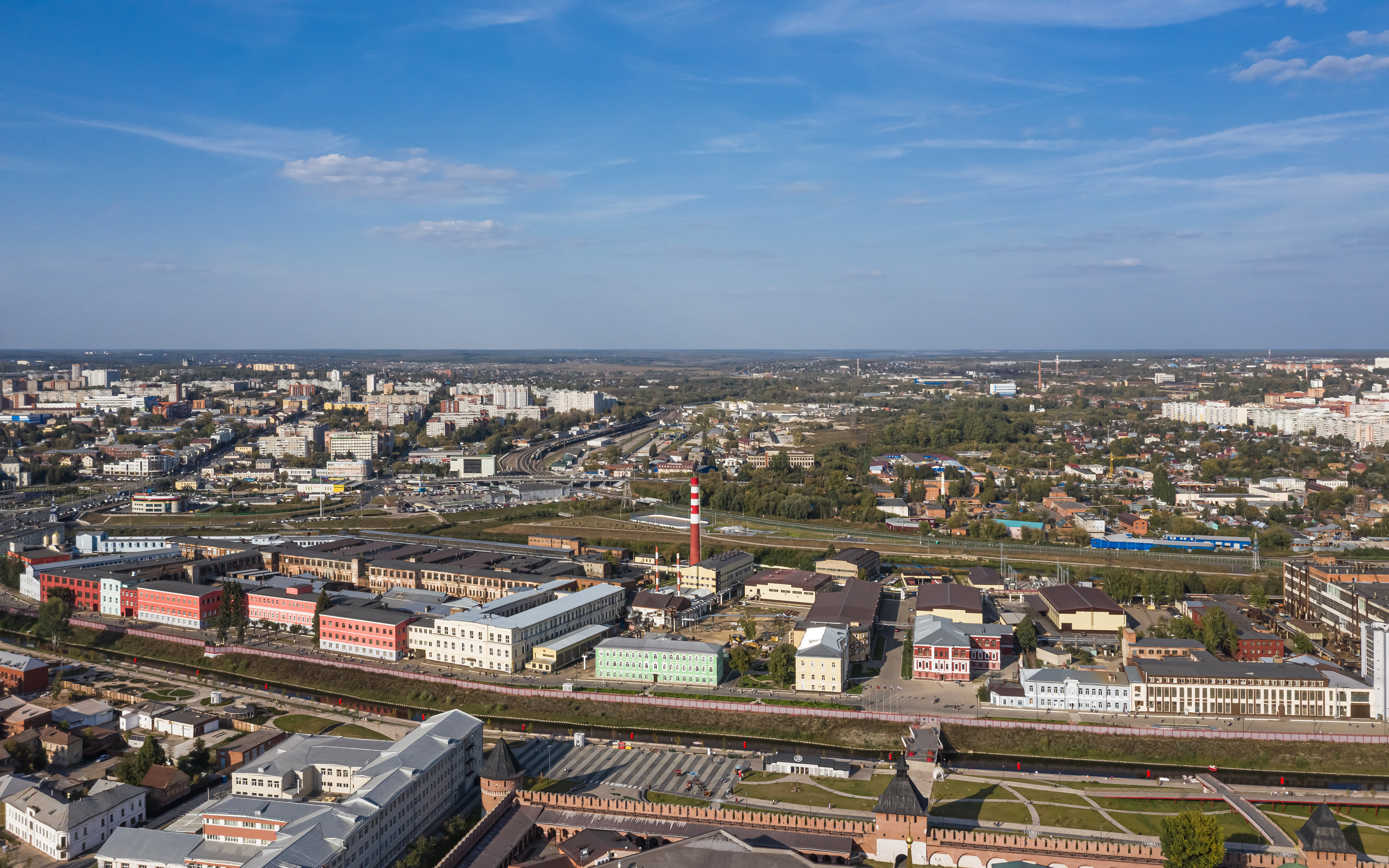
- Tula Arms Plant
- Native name: Императорский Тульский оружейный завод
- Type: Public limited company
- Industry: Arms industry
- Founded: 1712; 314 years ago
- Founder: Peter the Great
- Headquarters: Tula, Tula Oblast, Russia
- Key people: Sergey Pariyskiy (CEO)
- Products: ammunition, Firearms, autocannons, ATGMs, grenade launchers
- Revenue: $122 million (2017; 2021; 2022; 2023)
- Operating income: $13.9 million (2017; 2022; 2023)
- Net income: $10.1 million (2017; 2021; 2022; 2023)
- Total assets: $309 million (2017; 2021; 2022; 2023)
- Total equity: $26.8 million (2017; 2021; 2022; 2023)
- Number of employees: 3600 (August 2010)
- Parent: High Precision Systems (Rostec)
- Website: Official page
- Footnotes; Website page might be broken depending on user location

Imperial Tula Arms Plant (Russian: Императорский Тульский оружейный завод, romanized: Imperatorskiy Tulsky Oruzheiny Zavod) is a Russian weapons manufacturer founded by Tsar Peter I of Russia in 1712 in Tula, Tula Oblast as Tula Arsenal. Throughout its history, it has produced weapons for the Russian state. Its name was changed from Tula Arsenal to Tula Arms Plant during the Soviet era.

== History of the plant ==
Historically, the plant produced a wide variety of sports weapons and arms for the Imperial Russian Army.

=== 18th century ===
In the 18th century, the Tula Arsenal was recognized as setting the standard for Russian Arms Production.

=== 19th and early 20th century ===
Reconstructed in the 19th century, the Tula Arsenal became one of the most prominent arms factories in Europe.

In 1910 the Arsenal started production of the Maxim machine gun.

Under the Soviets, the name was changed to Tula Arms Plant. In 1927, a planning and design office was established in order to improve the work of all of the plant's designers, one result of which was the development of aircraft machine guns - the PV-1 and ShKAS. Between 1927 and 1938, the plant built the country's first spinning machines.

=== Importance during World War II ===
During World War II, Axis countries invaded the USSR as part of Operation Barbarossa. By December 5, 1941, the German 2nd Panzer Division had advanced to within a few kilometers of Tula, forcing the Soviets to evacuate the Arms Plant. As a result, far fewer weapons were produced there than at other Soviet factories such as the Izhevsk Mechanical Plant.

In 1941-1945, working under the slogan "Everything for the front, everything for victory", Tula gunsmiths produced Mosin–Nagant 91/30 rifles, SVT-40 self-loading rifles, ShVAK aircraft guns, Nagant revolvers and Tokarev pistols.

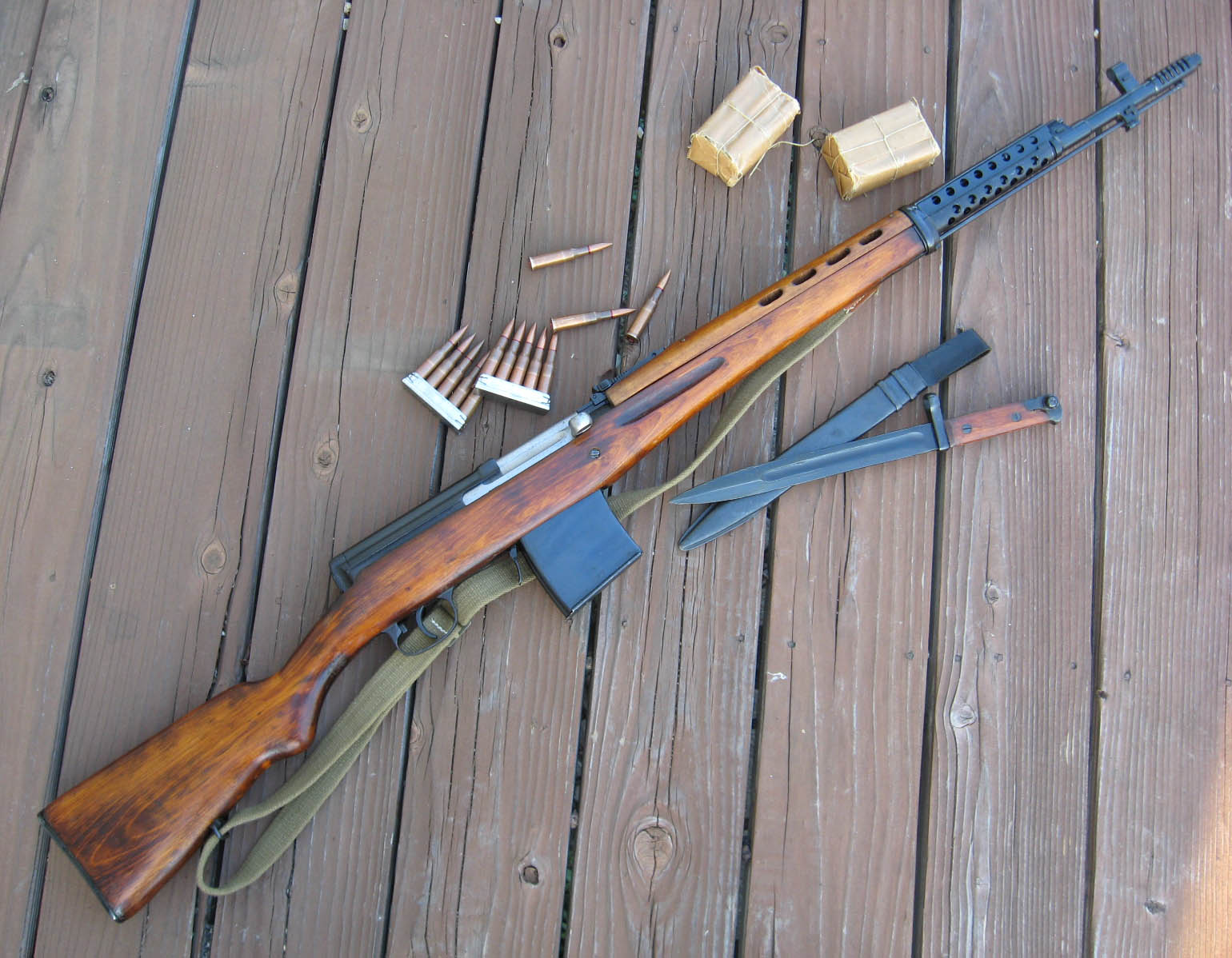
An SVT-40 Semi-auto rifle, made at Tula in 1940, chambered in 7.62x54mmR

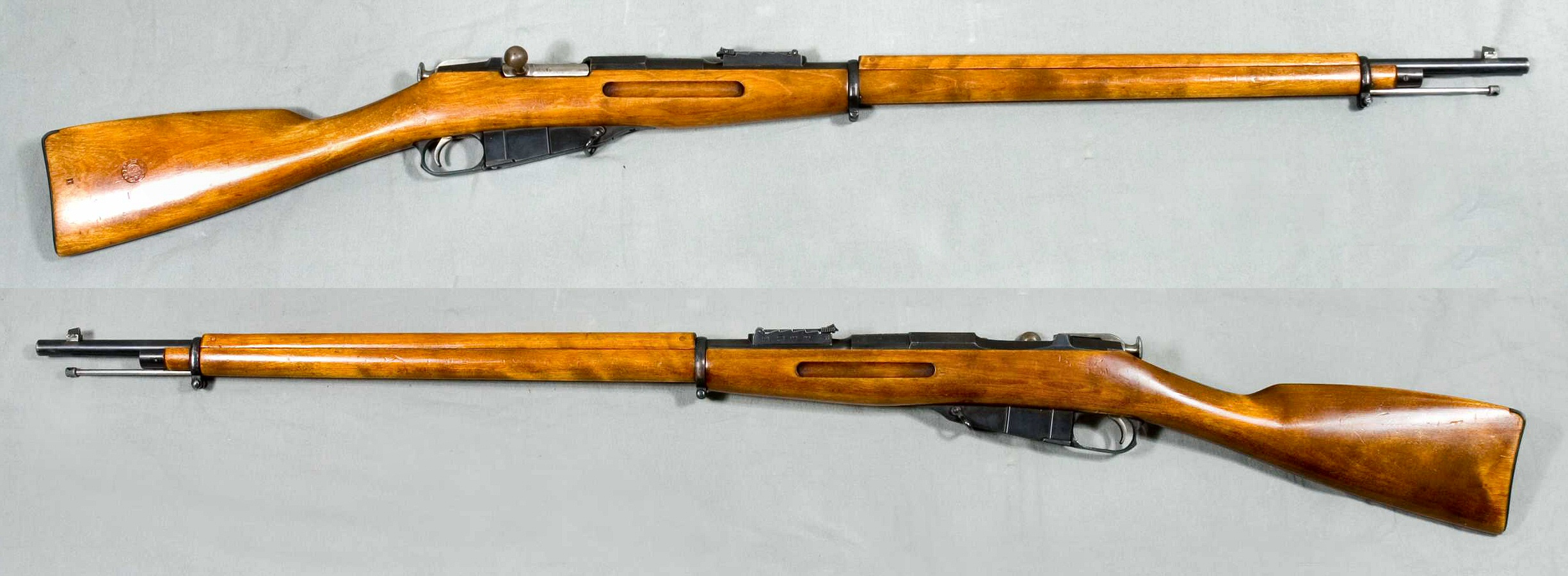
A Mosin-Nagant Bolt-Action rifle, chambered in 7.62x54mmR. From the collections of Armémuseum (Swedish Army Museum)

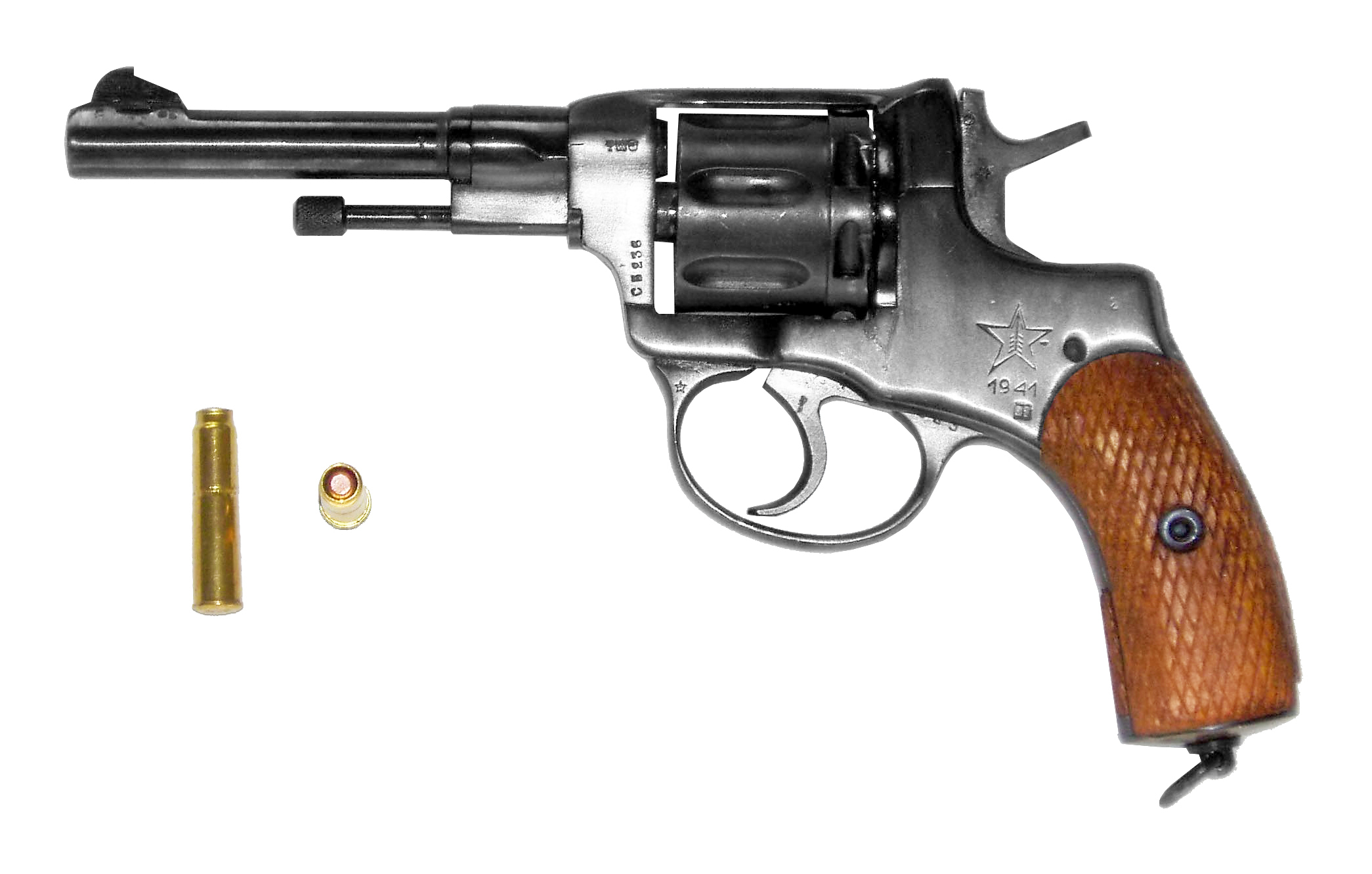
Nagant Revolver, chambered for 7.62x38mmR. Manufactured by the Tula Plant in 1941

=== Cold War ===
Tula was strategically important to the Soviet Union during the Cold War. Significant ore deposits were situated relatively close to it and it had access to ample transportation routes like the Upa River and many rail lines coming in and out of the city.

In 1965 constructors N. I. Korovyakov and V.P. Ochneva created a reliable double-barreled over-and-under shotgun TOZ-34.

During the 1960s–1980s, the plant received an order for production of the world-famous Kalashnikov assault rifles (six variants), anti-tank guided missiles - 9M14 Malyutka, 9M133 Kornet, 9M113 Konkurs and the Bonfire underslung grenade launcher.

== Products ==
During the early to mid-Soviet era, Tula Arms Plant produced a variety military rifles, including the Mosin–Nagant, SVT-40, SKS, and AKM. It also produced the Nagant M1895 revolver.

From the late 1970s to the early 1980s, the factory produced the AK-74, and went on to manufacture the VSS Vintorez, AS Val, OTs-14 Groza, and TOZ rifle weapons designed by TsNIITochMash. The plant also produces large quantities of small arms ammunition for the military as well as for commercial sale.

The factory has also manufactured a number of pistols over the years such as the Korovin pistol, TT pistol, Stechkin automatic pistol, SPP-1 underwater pistol, and MSP Groza silent pistol.

=== Notable products ===
Knives

- NRS-2

Pistols

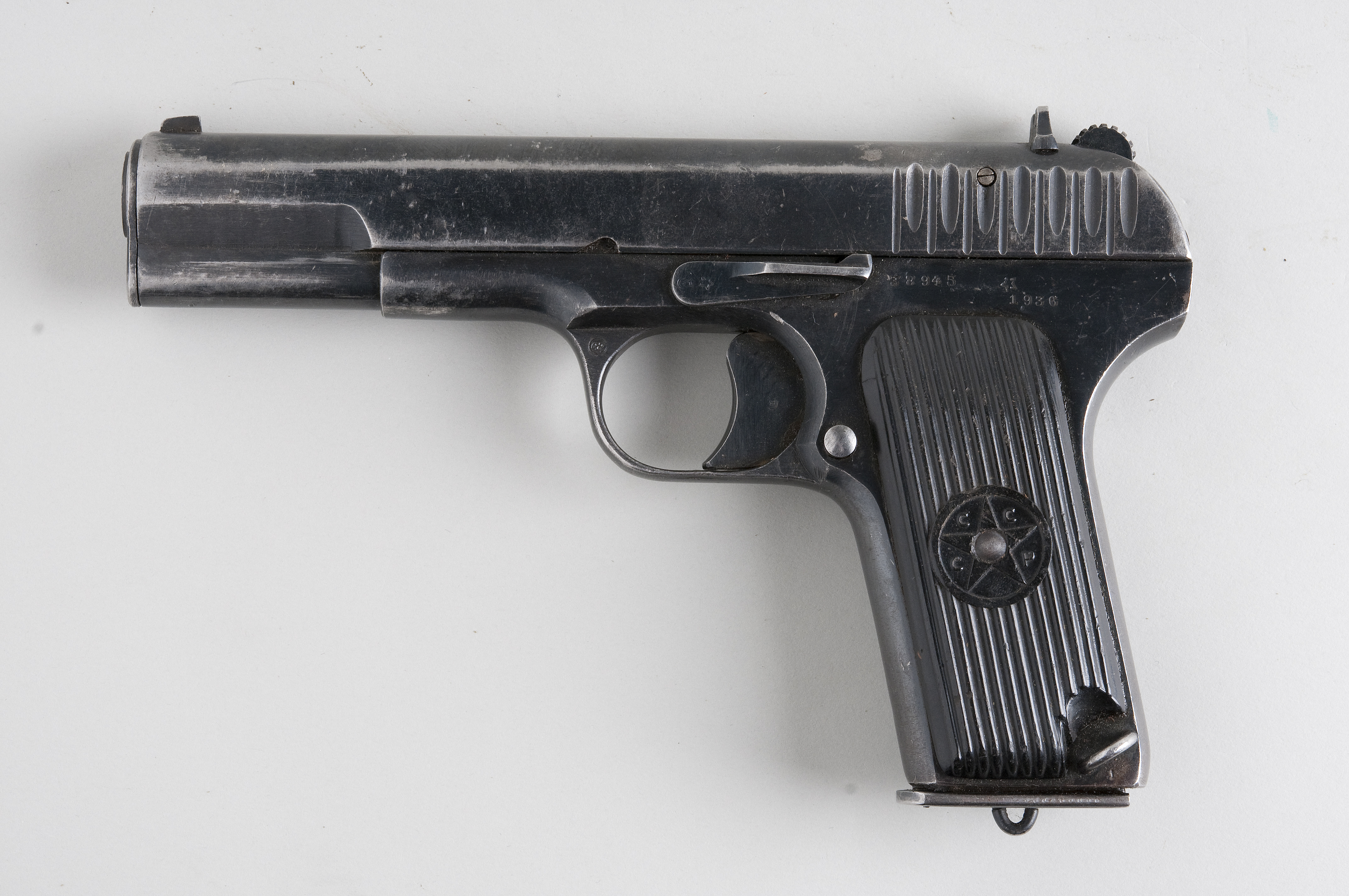
A Tokarev 33 Pistol, Chambered in 7.62x25mm Tokarev

- Nagant M1895 revolver
- SPP-1 underwater pistol
- TKB-506
- TT pistol
- TOZ-81

Shotguns

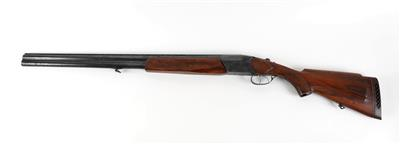
TOZ-34(Tulsky Oruzheiny Zavod / Tula ArmsPlant) Double-Barrel Shotgun in plain white backgroud

- TOZ-B
- TOZ-25
- TOZ-28
- TOZ-34
- TOZ-54
- TOZ-63
- TOZ-66
- TOZ-87
- TOZ-106
- TOZ-194
- TOZ-250
- MTs 21-12

Rifles

- APS underwater rifle
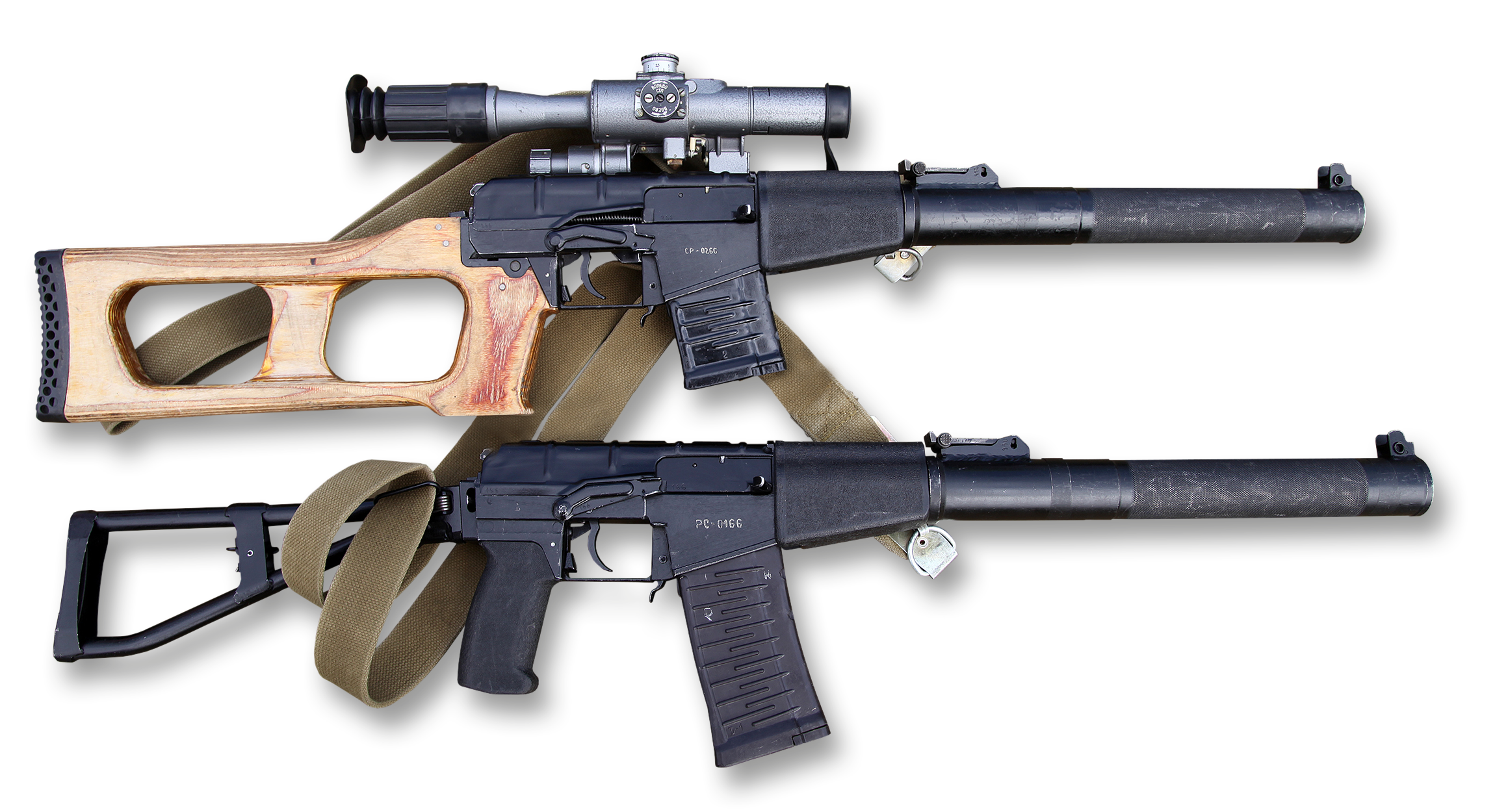
- VSS Vintorez (top) with the PSO-1-1 and 10-round magazine. AS Val (bottom) with a 20-round magazine
  AS Val
- ASM-DT amphibious rifle
- Mosin–Nagant
- SR-3 Vikhr
- SKS
- SVT-40
- TKB-010
- TKB-059
- TKB-072
- TKB-517
- TOZ rifle
- VSS Vintorez

== See also ==
- KBP Instrument Design Bureau
- Barnaul Cartridge Plant
- Wolf Ammunition
- Red Army Standard Ammunition
