= MSP Groza silent pistol =

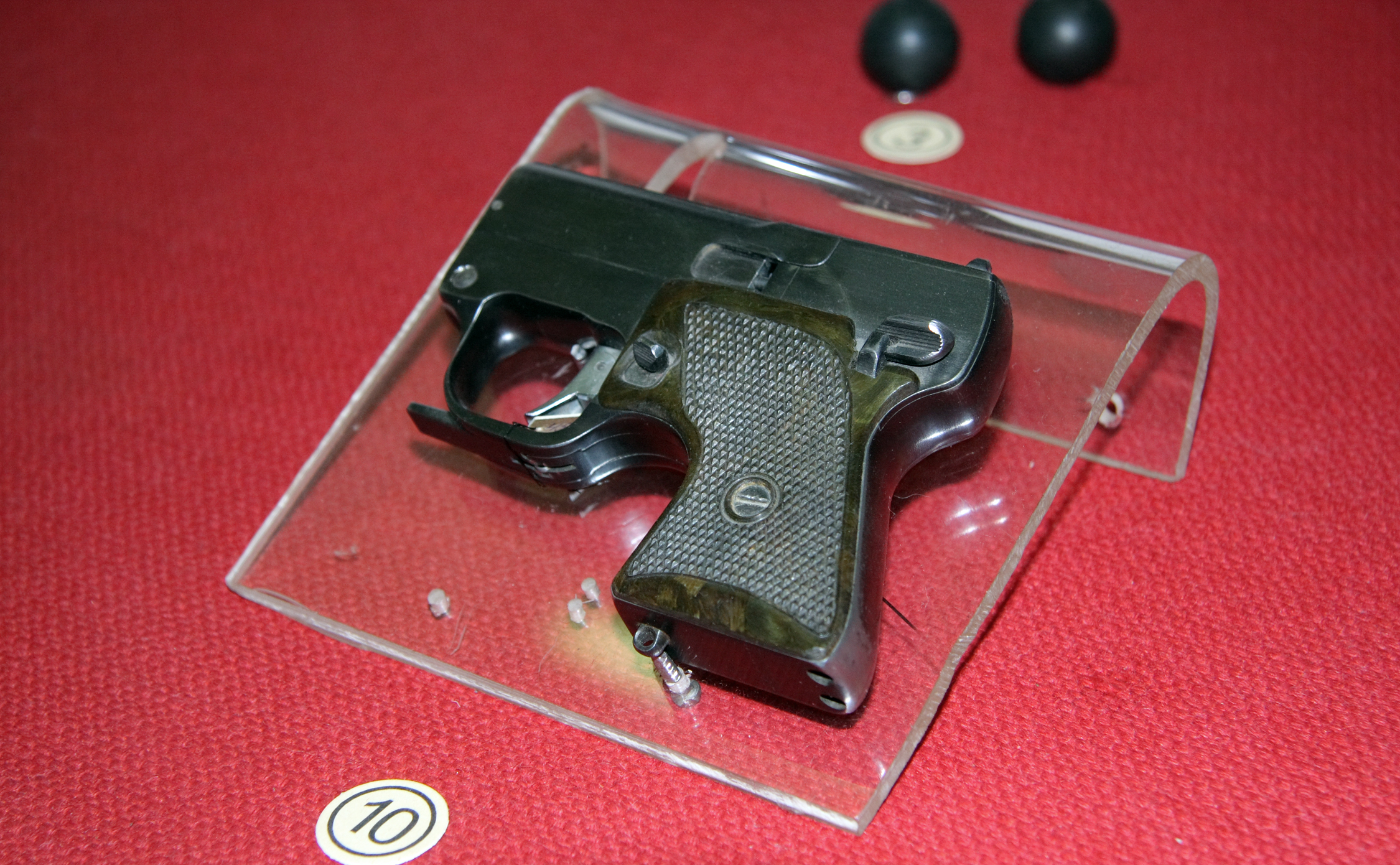
- Type: Silent, derringer
- Place of origin: Soviet Union

Service history
- Wars: Cold War; Soviet–Afghan War

Production history
- Designed: 1972
- Manufacturer: Tula Arsenal
- Produced: 1972–2002

Specifications
- Mass: 530 grams (1.17 lb)
- Length: 115 millimetres (4.5 in)
- Barrel length: 66 millimetres (2.6 in)
- Cartridge: 7.62×35 SP-3
- Caliber: 7.62 mm
- Barrels: 2
- Action: Break-action, Double Action Only
- Muzzle velocity: 200 metres per second (660 ft/s)
- Feed system: Manual, break open
- Sights: Fixed, iron sights

The MSP Groza silent pistol (Russian: Малогабаритный Специальный Пистолет «Гроза», romanized: Malogabaritnyy Spetsial'nyy Pistolet "Groza", lit. 'Compact Special Pistol "Thunder"') is an over and under, double-barrel, derringer-type firearm designed in the Soviet Union in 1972.

== History ==
The weapon was used operationally in Afghanistan and in Central America during the Cold War.

An FMLN supplied MSP is believed to have been the weapon used to assassinate Contras leader Enrique Bermúdez.

It is no longer in production, having been superseded by more modern designs.

== Design ==
The Groza uses a specialised cartridge. When fired, an internal piston within the cartridge launches the bullet forward and retains all the gases within the case, thus making a near silent weapon with almost no flash.

To load the weapon the user would depress a button, allowing the barrels to tilt forward and exposing the breech for manual loading either by individual cartridge or with the use of a disposable 2-round clip.

The firearm is chambered for the silent 7.62×35 SP-3 cartridge which can be loaded via a two-round clip. The weapon was designed at the request of the Soviet special services.

== Users ==
- Russia

=== Former ===
- Soviet Union

== See also ==
- Derringer
- PSS Silent Pistol
- S4M
