= S4M =

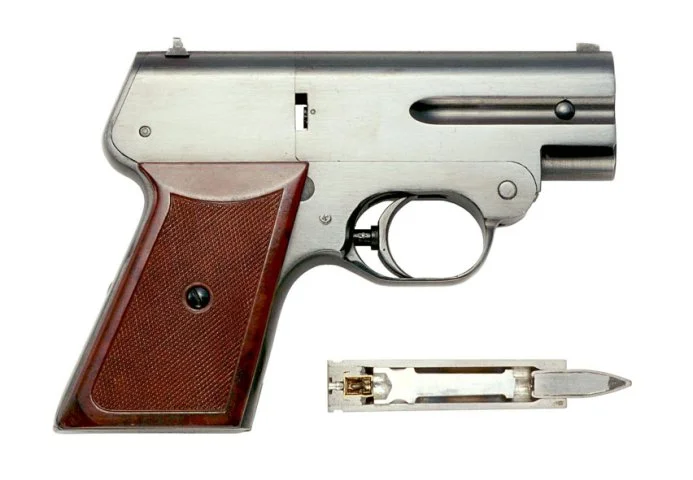
- Type: Two-shot pistol

Service history
- Wars: Cold War

Production history
- Manufacturer: Tula KBP
- Produced: 1965–present

Specifications
- Length: 147 mm (5.8 in)
- Barrel length: 80mm
- Height: 105 mm (4.1 in)
- Cartridge: 7.62×63mm PZ / PZA / PZAM
- Barrels: 2
- Action: Single-action, manually operated
- Effective firing range: near-point blank
- Feed system: Manual, break open
- Sights: Fixed front blade, adjustable rear notch

The S4M (Russian: С4М) was a silent derringer used by the Soviet secret services.

== History ==
The S4M was kept highly secret. Information on the pistol was not known by Western governments until well after the end of the Cold War.

== Design ==
The S4M was a simple break-open, two-shot derringer, but the unique features came from its specialized ammunition, designed around a cut-down version of the 7.62×39mm rounds used in the Soviet AK-47.

The casings of the round contained a piston-like plunger between the bullet and the powder that would move forward inside the casing when fired. The piston would push the round down the barrel and plug the end of the casing, completely sealing off any explosive gases in the casing. This, combined with the inherently low-velocity round resulted in a truly silent pistol.

The nature of the gun and ammunition led to it being wildly inaccurate outside of point-blank range.

To add further confusion and throw possible suspicion away from the assassin, the barrel rifling was designed to affect the bullet in such a way that ballistics experts would not only conclude that the round was fired from an AK-47, but that the round was fired from several hundred metres away.

== Successor ==
The S4M was succeeded by a less powerful, but otherwise fairly similar, MSP using the newer SP-3 ammunition in 7.62×39mm, which also used in the NRS knife.

== Users ==
- Soviet Union

== See also ==
- Derringer
- PSS silent pistol
- TKB-506
