= Silencer (firearms) =

Device which reduces sound intensity or muzzle flash on a firearm

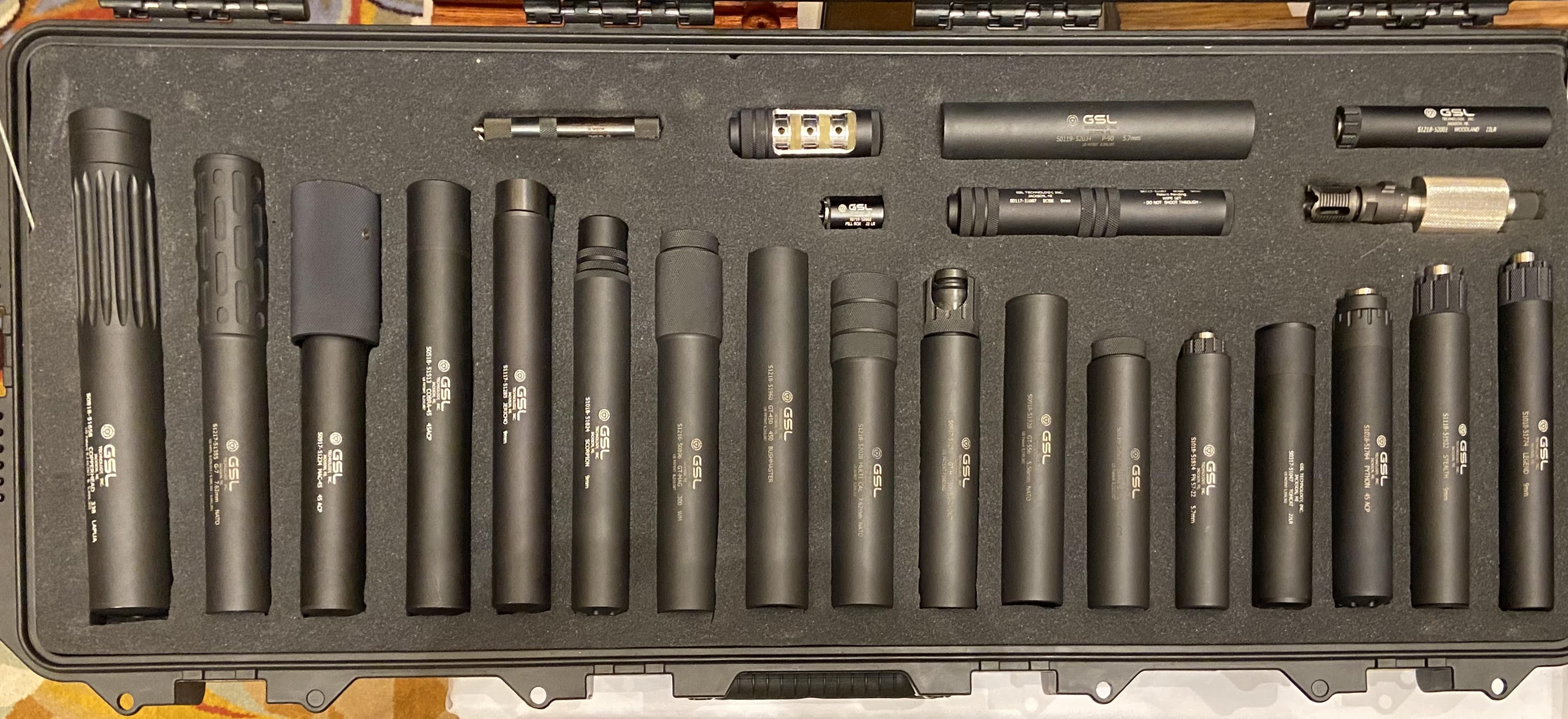
A case of suppressors produced by Gemtech

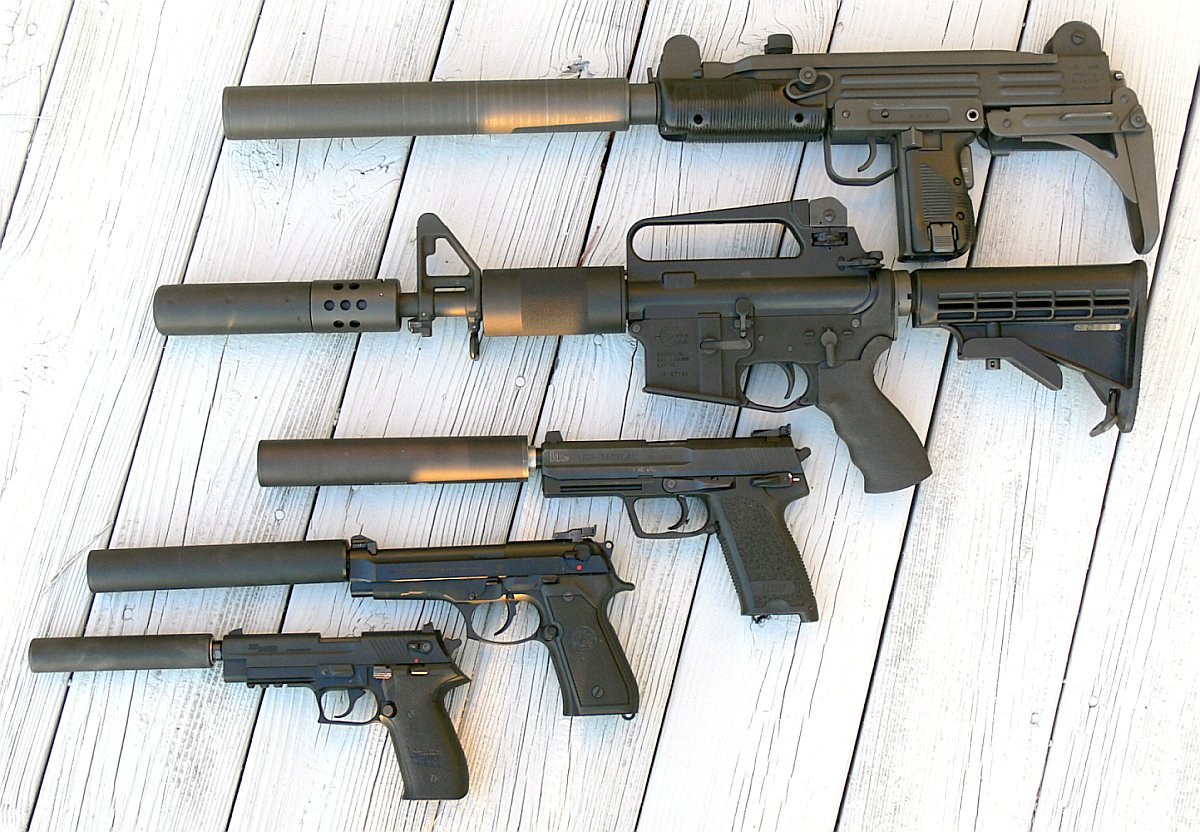
Suppressed firearms with their magazines removed Top to bottom: Uzi; AR-15; Heckler & Koch USP; Beretta 92FS; SIG Mosquito

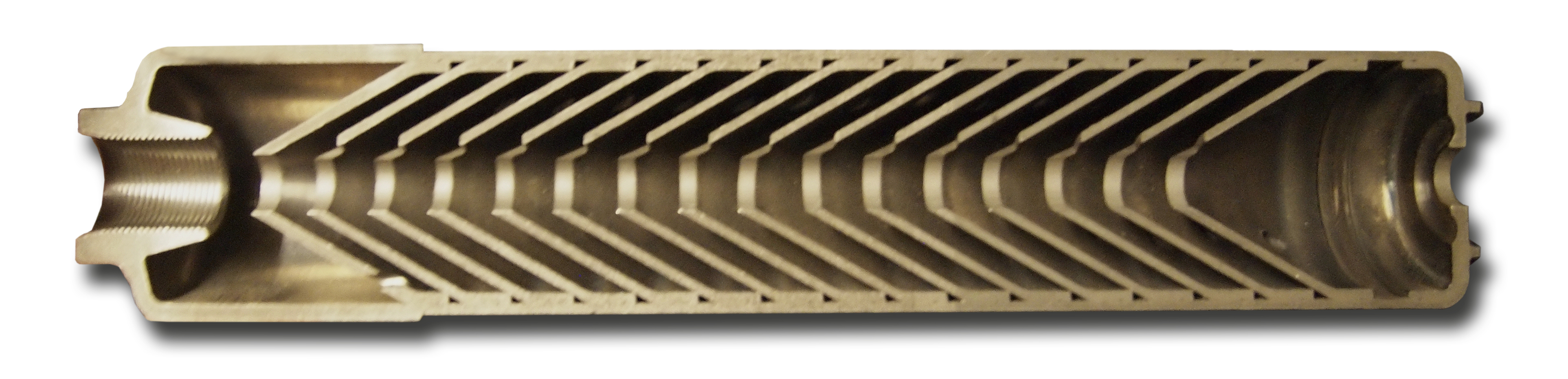
Cutaway of a suppressor

A silencer, also known as a sound suppressor, suppressor, or sound moderator, is a muzzle device that suppresses the blast created when a gun (firearm or airgun) is discharged, thereby reducing the acoustic intensity of the muzzle report (sound of a gunshot) and jump, by modulating the speed and pressure of the propellant gas released from the muzzle. Like other muzzle devices, a silencer can be a detachable accessory mounted to the muzzle or an integral part of the barrel.

A typical silencer is a metallic (usually stainless steel or titanium) cylinder containing numerous internal sound baffles, with a hollow bore to allow the bullet to exit normally. During firing, the bullet passes through the bore with little hindrance, but most of the expanding gas ejecta behind it is redirected through a longer and convoluted escape path created by the baffles, prolonging the release time. This slows down the gas and dissipates its kinetic energy into a larger surface area, reducing the blast intensity, thus lowering the loudness.

Silencers can also reduce the recoil during shooting, but unlike a muzzle brake or a recoil compensator, which reduce recoil by vectoring the muzzle blast sideways, silencers release almost all the gases towards the front. However, the internal baffles significantly prolong the time of the gas release and thereby decrease the rearward thrust generated, as for the same impulse, force is inversely proportional to time. The weight of the silencer itself and the leverage of its mounting location (at the far front end of the barrel) will also help counter muzzle rise.

Because the internal baffles will slow and cool the released gas and contain gunpowder that is still burning upon exit from the muzzle, silencers also reduce or even eliminate the muzzle flash. This is different from a flash suppressor, which reduces the amount of flash by dispersing burning gases that are already released outside the muzzle, without necessarily reducing sound or recoil. A flash hider, or muzzle shroud, in contrast, conceals visible flashes by screening them from the direct line of sight, rather than reducing the intensity of the flash.

== History ==
In 1892, Swiss inventor Jakob Stahel patented a silencer intended for killing cattle, though he claimed it could be adapted to other firearms too. In 1894 another silencer for use with firearms was patented by another Swiss inventor, C.A. Aeppli.

American inventor Hiram Percy Maxim, son of Maxim gun inventor Hiram Stevens Maxim, and co-founder of the American Radio Relay League, is usually credited with inventing and selling the first commercially successful silencer around 1902. He received his patent on March 30, 1909. Maxim gave his device the popularly trademarked name "Maxim Silencer," and it was regularly advertised in sporting goods magazines. The muffler for internal combustion engines was developed in parallel with the firearm silencer by Maxim in the early 20th century, using many of the same techniques to provide quieter-running engines, and in many English-speaking countries automobile mufflers are called silencers.

Former president of the United States Theodore Roosevelt was known to purchase and use Maxim silencers.

Silencers were regularly used by agents of the United States Office of Strategic Services, who favored the newly designed High Standard HDM .22 LR pistol during World War II. OSS Director William Joseph "Wild Bill" Donovan demonstrated the pistol for President Franklin D. Roosevelt at the White House. According to OSS research chief Stanley Lovell, Donovan, an old and trusted friend of the President, was waved into the Oval Office, where Roosevelt was dictating a letter. When Roosevelt finished, Donovan turned his back and fired a shot into a sandbag he had brought with him, announced what he had done and handed the smoking gun to the astonished president. The British Special Operations Executive (SOE) Welrod pistol with an integral silencer was also used by the American OSS on clandestine operations in Nazi-occupied Europe.

In 2020, the United States Marine Corps began to field suppressors in its combat units, citing improved communication on a squad and platoon level because of the reduced sound. The USMC purchased 7,000 suppressors in 2020, and planned to have a total of 30,000 by the end of 2023, making them the first armed service to issue suppressors for general usage.

== Terminology ==
Different suppressor designs

Gun rights advocates, gun media and the firearms industry generally claim that the word "silencer" is defined as meaning total silence, while "suppressor" or "moderator" are defined as meaning only reduced sound intensity, in spite of its original definition. As such, "suppressor" and "moderator" have become the suggested terms.

The US National Firearms Act (NFA) of 1934 defined silencers and established regulations limiting their sale and ownership. Both the US Department of Justice and the Bureau of Alcohol, Tobacco, Firearms and Explosives (ATF) use the term silencer. Hiram Percy Maxim, the original inventor of the device, marketed them as "Maxim Silencers".

The earliest use of the technical term suppressor to refer to firearm noise reduction is in US Patent 4530417, July 23, 1985, "A suppressor for reducing the muzzle blast of firearms or the like". In UK English, moderator is the more commonly used term.

The Oxford, American Heritage, and other dictionaries apply the term suppressor to such contexts as electromagnetic shielding devices, genetics, and censorship, but not firearms. These dictionaries define both silencer and suppressor as essentially equivalent and interchangeable, neither applying exclusively or primarily to sound, and both being applicable as much to complete and total quiet or to partial reduction of sound.

In 2011, the National Rifle Association of America began a campaign to increase the civilian use of silencers for hunting and sport shooting in the US, setting the goals of easing the restrictions in the Federal NFA of 1934, and in various state laws, regulating the sale and ownership of firearm silencers. In the same year, the American Silencer Association (ASA) was founded by US manufacturers of silencers, with the same goals of moving silencers into the mainstream. Along with state and federal legislative lobbying efforts, the NRA and ASA began public information campaigns designed to change the perception of silencers from their association with espionage, assassination, crime or military special operation use, to instead show that silencers can have health and safety benefits, primarily protecting the hearing of shooters and people in the vicinity, and to debunk the perceived myth in popular television, film and video game media that silencers are so effective that gunshot sounds can go totally unnoticed, such as by people in the next room of a building.

In 2014, the ASA changed its name to American Suppressor Association "in a continuing effort to dispel myths about suppressors". Gun control advocates have said that changing the name from "silencer" to "suppressor" is semantic propaganda similar to the efforts to avoid terms like "assault rifle" or "assault weapon" in favor of friendlier-sounding language like "modern sporting rifle", while gun-rights advocates make essentially the opposite argument, and also that the widespread term silencer reflects technical ignorance and is poorly defined.

== Firearm noise anatomy ==
When discharged, a firearm makes sound from three sources:

- Muzzle blast – shockwave generated by high-pressure gases escaping and expanding from the muzzle after the projectile exits the barrel and breaks the functional seal restraining the gas inside the bore
- Sonic boom – sharp bullwhip-cracking sound associated with high-frequency shockwaves caused by an object (in this case, the bullet) flying supersonically through the air
- Mechanical noise generated by the internal moving parts of the firearm action

A silencer can affect only the noise generated by the muzzle blast.

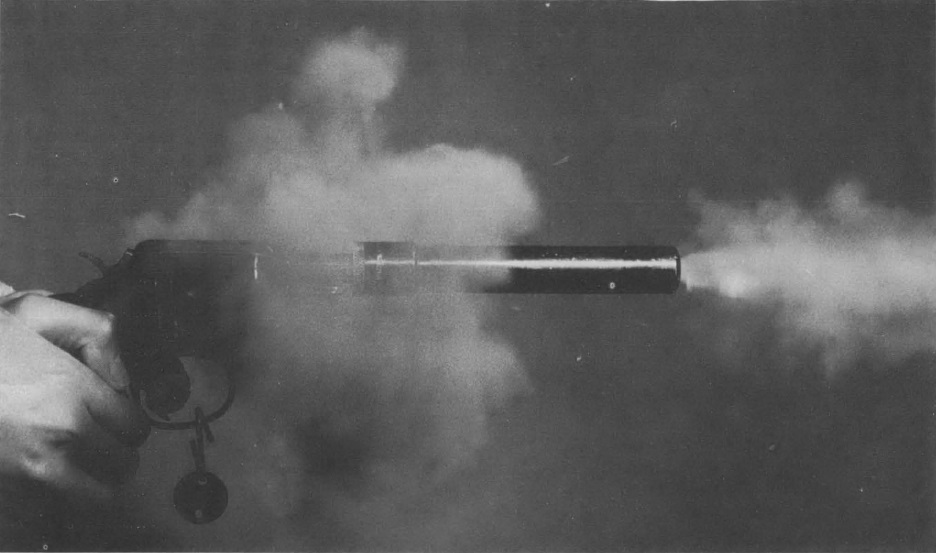
Revolver with suppressor. Gas can be seen escaping between cylinder and barrel

While using subsonic ammunition can negate the sonic boom, mechanical noise can be reduced but is nearly impossible to eliminate. For these reasons, it is difficult to completely silence any firearm, or achieve a high level of noise suppression in revolvers. Revolvers have a looser gas seal between the barrel and the cylinder that emits noise from escaping gases. Some revolver designs attempt to overcome this, such as the Russian Nagant M1895 and OTs-38, and the US S&W QSPR.

Muzzle blast generated by firearm discharge is directly proportional to the amount of propellant to be combusted within the cartridge. Therefore, the greater the case capacity (i.e. a magnum cartridge), the louder the muzzle blast, and consequently a more efficient or larger silencer system is required. A gunshot (the combination of the sonic boom, the vacuum release, and hot gases) will almost always be louder than the sound of the action cycling of an autoloading firearm. Alan C. Paulson, a renowned firearms specialist, claimed to have encountered an integrally suppressed .22 LR gun that had such a quiet report. Properly evaluating the sound generated by a firearm can be done only with a decibel meter in conjunction with a frequency spectrum analyzer during live tests.

== Design and construction ==
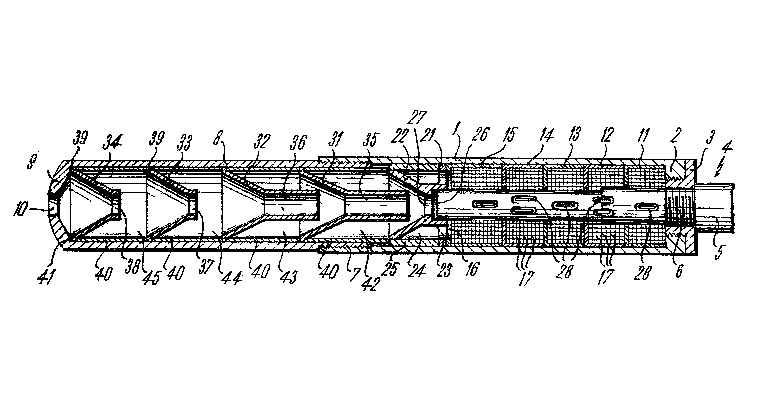
Cross-section of a suppressor integral to the firearm

A silencer is typically a hollow metal tube made from steel, aluminum, or titanium and contains expansion chambers. It is usually cylindrical in shape, and attaches to the muzzle of a pistol, submachine gun, or rifle. Some can-type silencers, named for their resemblance to beverage cans, are detachable, and can be attached to a different firearm. In contrast, integral silencers consist of an expansion chamber or chambers surrounding the barrel. The barrel has openings or ports that bleed off-gases into the chambers. This type of silencer is part of the firearm, and maintenance of the suppressor requires that the firearm be at least partially disassembled.

Both types of silencers reduce noise by allowing the rapidly expanding gases from the firing of the cartridge to be decelerated and cooled through a series of hollow chambers. The trapped gas exits the suppressor over a longer period of time and at a greatly reduced speed, producing less noise signature. The chambers are divided by either baffles or wipes (softer material through which the projectile passes). There are typically at least four and up to perhaps fifteen chambers in a suppressor, depending on the intended use and design details. Often, a single, larger expansion chamber is located at the muzzle end of a can-type silencer, which allows the propellant gas to expand considerably and slow down before it encounters the baffles or wipes. This larger chamber may be "reflexed" toward the rear of the barrel to minimize the overall length of the combined firearm and silencer, especially with longer weapons such as rifles.

Silencers vary greatly in size and efficiency. One disposable type developed in the 1980s by the U.S. Navy for 9×19mm pistols was 150 mm (5.9 in) long and 45 mm (1.8 in) in outside diameter, and was designed for six shots with standard ammunition or up to thirty shots with subsonic (slower than the speed of sound) ammunition. In contrast, one suppressor designed for rifles firing the powerful .50 caliber (BMG) cartridge is 509 mm (20.0 in) long and 76 mm (3.0 in) in diameter.

Two ancillary advantages of the silencer are recoil reduction and flash suppression. Muzzle flash is reduced both by being contained in the suppressor and by the arresting of unburned powder that would ordinarily burn in the air and intensify the flash. Recoil reduction results from the slowing of propellant gases that contribute 30–50% of recoil velocity. However, some suppressors can increase the backpressure produced by the propellant gases. This can cause them to function somewhat like a muzzle booster and thus increase the felt recoil. The weight of the silencer and the location of that additional weight at the muzzle reduces recoil through the basic mass as well as muzzle flip because of the location of this mass.

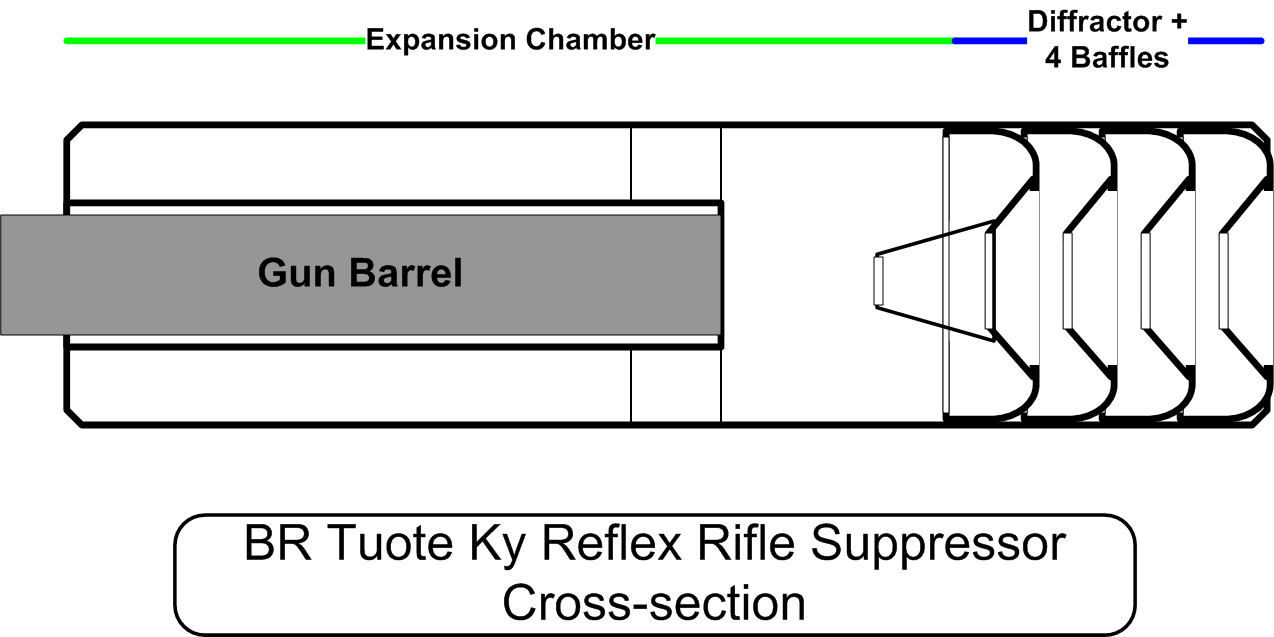
Cross-section drawing of a centerfire rifle suppressor, showing expansion chamber "reflexed" (going back around) the rifle barrel, and four sound baffles. The diffractor and baffles are carefully shaped to deflect gas.

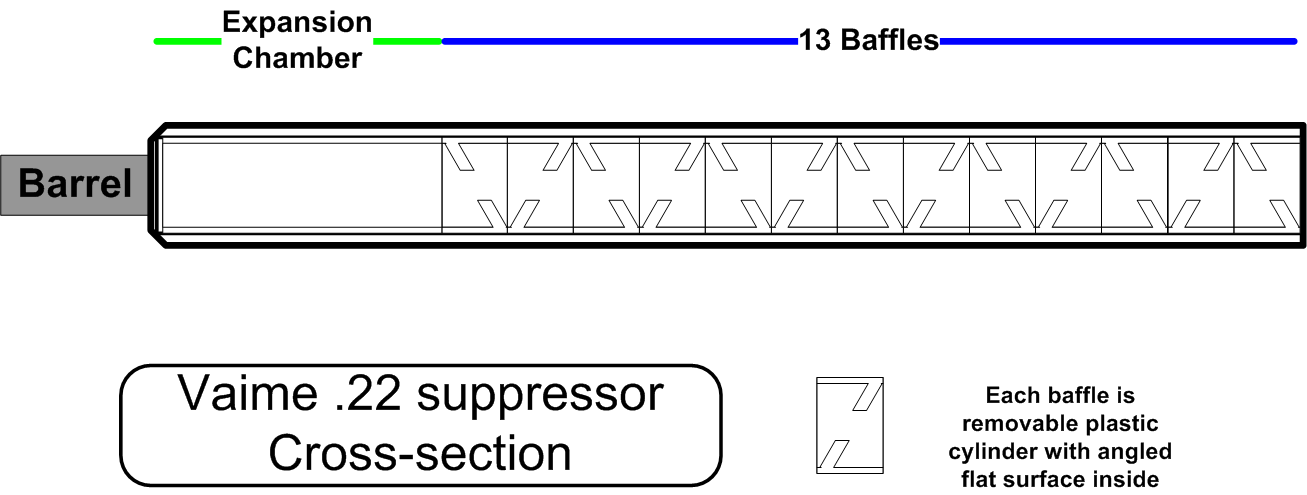
Cross-section drawing of a rimfire rifle suppressor, showing short expansion chamber and thirteen plastic baffles. These baffles use alternating angled flat surfaces to repeatedly deflect gas expanding through the suppressor. In the actual suppressor, baffles are oriented 90 degrees to one another about the axis of bullet travel. (The illustration does not demonstrate this well.)

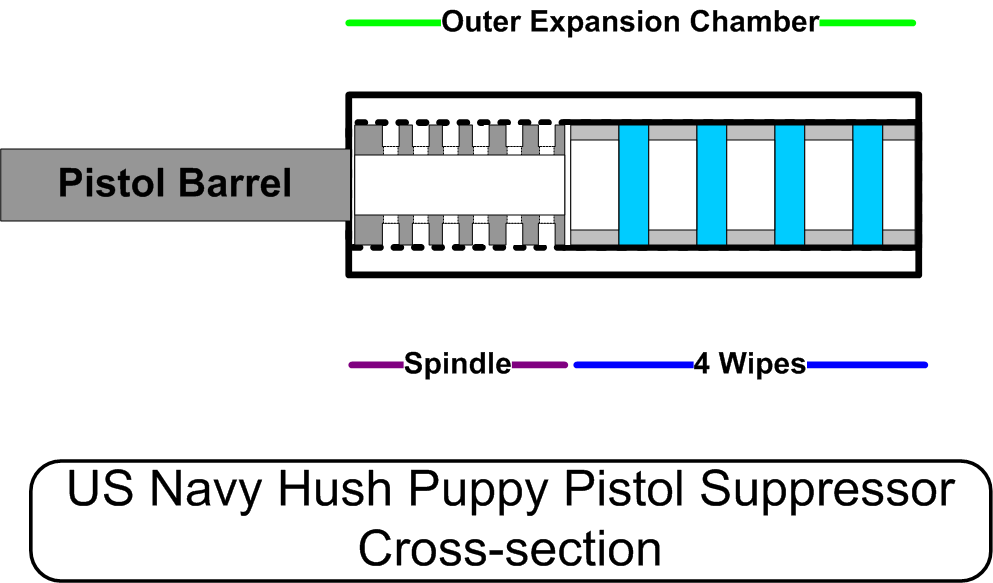
Cross-section drawing of a pistol suppressor, showing expansion chamber wrapped around inner suppressor assembly, and four wipes. The bullet pushes a bullet-diameter hole through the wipes, trapping propellant gas behind it entirely until the bullet has passed through the wipe completely

=== Baffles and spacers ===
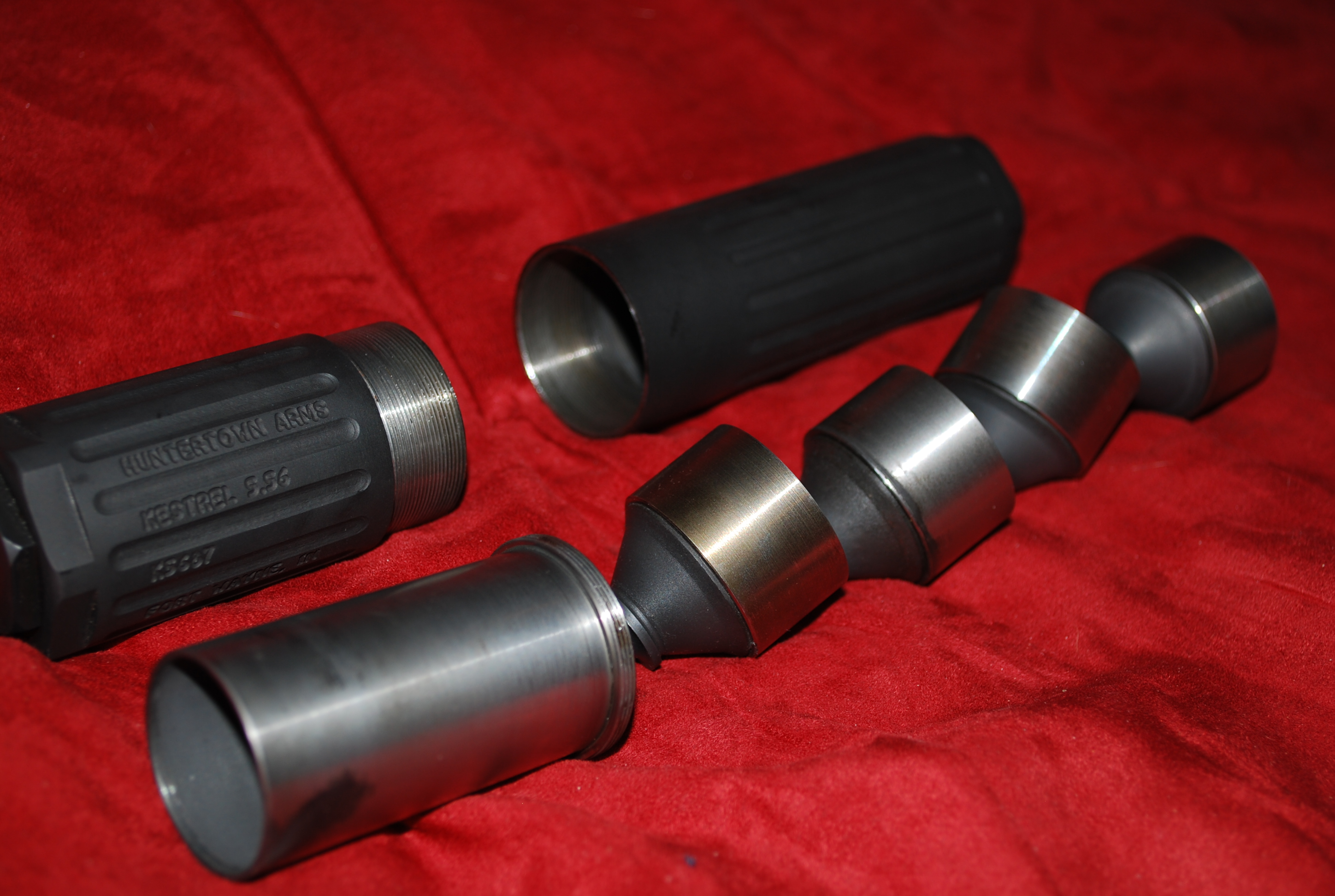
Firearm suppressor disassembled to show (counterclockwise from bottom) blast chamber, baffles, and sections of the outer tube

Baffles are usually circular metal dividers that separate the expansion chambers. Each baffle has a hole in its center to permit the passage of the bullet through the silencer and toward the target. The hole is typically at least 1mm larger than the bullet caliber to minimize the risk of the bullet hitting the baffle, called a baffle strike. Baffles are typically made of stainless steel, aluminum, titanium, or alloys such as Inconel, and are either machined out of solid metal or stamped out of sheet metal. A few silencers for low-powered cartridges such as the .22 Long Rifle have successfully used plastic baffles (certain models by Vaime and others).

There are several unique baffle designs. M, K, Z, monolithic core and Ω (Omega) are the most prevalent. M-type, an inverted cone, is the crudest. K forms slanted obstructions diverging from the sidewalls, creating turbulence across the boreline. Z is expensive to machine and includes pockets of dead airspace along the sidewalls which trap expanded gases and hold them thereby lengthening the time that the gases cool before exiting. Omega-type baffles form a series of spaced cones drawing gas away from the borderline and incorporate a scalloped mouth creating cross-bore turbulence, which is in turn directed to a "mouse-hole" opening between the baffle stack and sidewall.

Propellant gas heats and erodes the baffles, causing wear, which is worsened by high rates of fire. Aluminum baffles are seldom used with fully automatic weapons because service life is unacceptably short. Some modern suppressors using steel or high-temperature alloy baffles can endure extended periods of fully automatic fire without damage. The highest-quality rifle suppressors available today have a claimed service life of greater than 30,000 rounds. Baffles have not been given any specific angles, a specific size, or weight to meet any standards; they are created on a trial and error basis.

Spacers separate baffles and keep them aligned at a specified distance from one another inside the silencer. Many baffles and spacers are manufactured as a single assembly and several suppressor designs have all the baffles attached together with spacers as a one-piece helical baffle stack. Modern baffles are usually carefully shaped to divert the propellant gases effectively into the chambers. This shaping can be a slanted flat surface, canted at an angle to the bore, or a conical or otherwise curved surface. One popular technique is to have alternating angled surfaces through the stack of baffles.

=== Wipes and packing material ===
Wipes are inner dividers intended to touch the bullet as it passes through the silencer, and are typically made of rubber, plastic, or foam. Each wipe may have either a hole drilled in it before use or a pattern stamped into its surface at the point where the bullet will strike it, or it may simply be punched through by the bullet. Wipes typically last for a small number of firings (perhaps no more than five) before their performance is greatly degraded. While many suppressors used wipes in the Vietnam War era, most modern suppressors do not use them as anything that touches the projectile degrades accuracy. All wipes deteriorate quickly and require disassembly and spare parts replacement.

Wet silencers or wet cans use a small quantity of water, oil, grease, or gel in the expansion chambers to cool the propellant gases and reduce their volume (see ideal gas law). The coolant lasts only a few shots before it must be replenished, but can greatly increase the effectiveness of the suppressor. Water is most effective, because of its high heat of vaporization, but it can run or evaporate out of the silencer. Grease, while messier and less effective than water, can be left in the suppressor indefinitely without losing effectiveness. Oil is the least effective and least preferable, as it runs while being as messy as grease, and leaves behind a fine mist of aerosolized oil after each shot. Water-based gels, such as wire-pulling lubricant gel, are a good compromise; they offer the efficacy of water with less mess, as they do not run or drip. However, they take longer to apply, as they must be cleared from the bore of the suppressor to ensure a clear path for the bullet (grease requires this step as well). Generally, only pistol silencers are shot wet, as rifle silencers handle such high pressure and heat that the liquid is gone within 1–3 shots. Many manufacturers will not warranty their rifle suppressors for wet fire, as some feel this may even result in a dangerous over-pressurization of the silencer.

Packing materials such as metal mesh, steel wool, or metal washers may be used to fill the chambers and further dissipate and cool the gases. These are somewhat more effective than empty chambers but less effective than wet designs. Metal mesh, if properly used, may last for hundreds or thousands of shots of spaced semi-automatic fire; however, steel wool usually degrades within ten shots, with stainless steel wool lasting longer than regular steel wool. Like wipes, packing materials are rarely found in modern silencers.

Wipes, packing materials, and purpose-designed wet cans have been generally abandoned in 21st-century suppressor design because they decrease overall accuracy and require excessive cleaning and maintenance. The instructions from several manufacturers state that their suppressors need not be cleaned at all. Furthermore, legal changes in the United States during the 1980s and 1990s made it much more difficult for end-users to legally replace internal silencer parts, and the newer designs reflect this reality.

=== Attachment ===
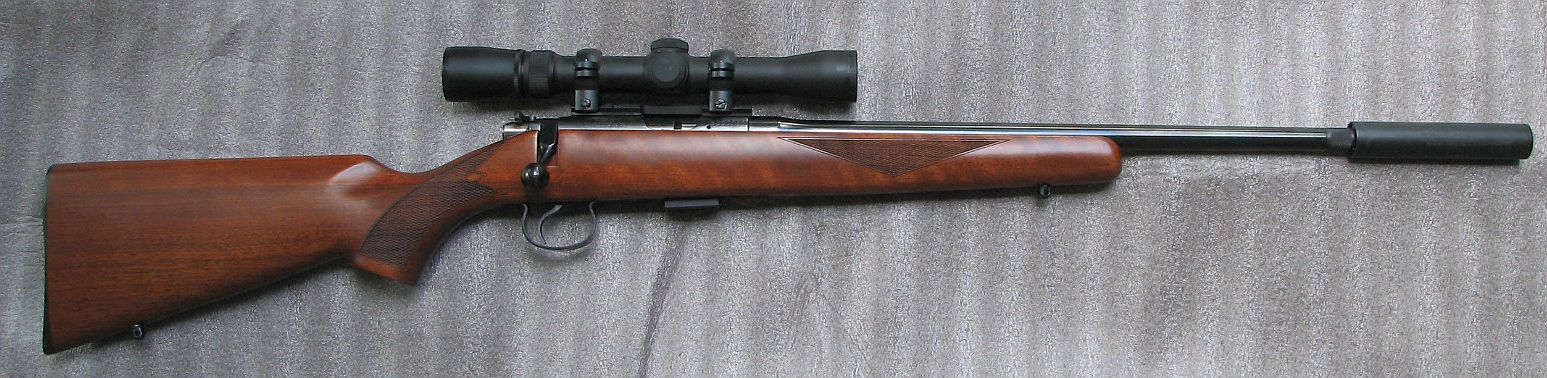
Hunting rifle with suppressor

Apart from integral silencers that are integrated as a part of the firearm's barrel, most suppressors have a female threaded end, which attaches to male threads cut into the exterior of the barrel. These types of silencers are mostly used on handguns and rifles chambered in .22LR. More powerful rifles may use this type of attachment, but harsh recoil may cause the suppressor to over-tighten to the barrel and the suppressor can become difficult to remove. SilencerCo's Salvo silencer for shotguns attaches via internal barrel threading normally used to mount removable chokes.

Military rifles such as the M16 or M14 often use quick-detach suppressors that use coarser than normal threads and are installed over an existing muzzle device such as a flash suppressor and can include a secondary locking mechanism to allow the shooter to quickly and safely add or remove a sound suppressor based on individual needs.

=== Advanced types ===
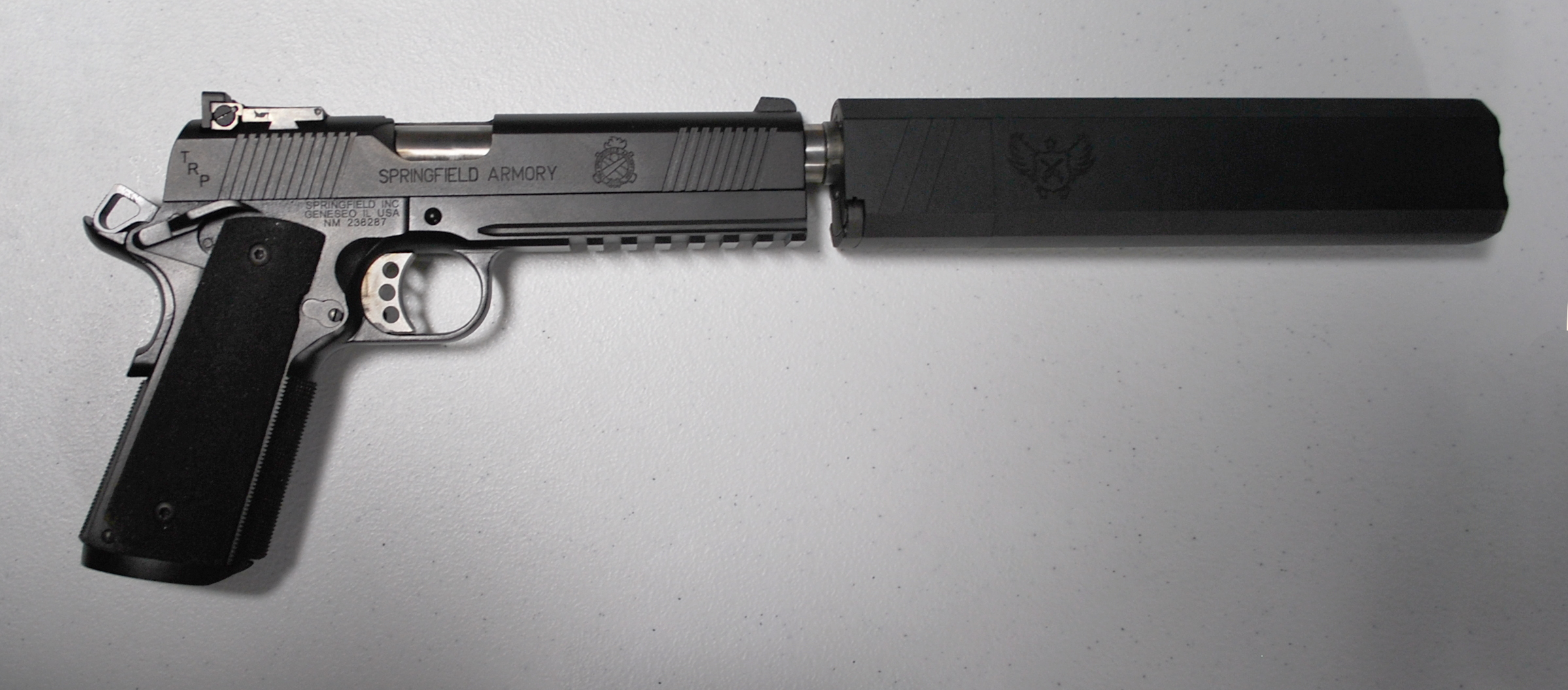
SilencerCo Osprey .45 suppressor on a Springfield pistol

In addition to containing and slowly releasing the gas pressure associated with muzzle blast or reducing pressure through the use of coolant mediums, advanced silencer designs attempt to modify the properties of the sound waves generated by the muzzle blast. In these designs, effects known as frequency shifting and phase cancellation (or destructive interference) are used in an attempt to make the suppressor quieter. These effects are achieved by separating the flow of gases and causing them to collide with one another or by venting them through precision-made holes. The intended effect of frequency shifting is to shift audible sound waves frequencies into ultrasound (above 20 kHz), beyond the range of human hearing. The Russian AN-94 assault rifle has a muzzle attachment that claims apparent noise reduction by venting some gases through a "dog-whistle" type channel. Phase cancellation occurs when similar sound waves encounter one another 180° out of phase, cancelling the amplitude of the wave and eliminating the pressure variations perceived as sound.

An alternate method under development is called an "anti-phase destructive interference generator." The process duplicates the sound waves generated by the muzzle blast and then uses them to create an anti-phase auditory signal. Currently, this is a muzzle attached device and is only being tested to cancel out the gunshot sound of the firearm. The devices tested incorporate multiple microphones, speakers, and an auditory processor. The first shot fired is recorded, and then played back precisely out of sync (180 degrees out of phase) with each subsequent shot. This has proven successful with small caliber (.17-.22) rifles, but the amplitude has not been matched efficiently with larger cartridges. With the use of subsonic ammunition, the resultant sound waves effectively cancel out one another, and with the exception of the sound of the action cycling, eliminate any gunshot sound. In the current development stage, this has worked only in close proximity to the shooter, and the pressure wave (p-wave) can still be felt. Each time a different type of ammunition or firearm is used, the device needs recalibration.

Taking advantage of either property requires that the silencer be designed within the specification of the muzzle blast in mind. For example, the velocity of the sound waves is a major factor. This figure can change significantly between different cartridges and barrel lengths.

However, these concepts are controversial because a muzzle blast creates broadband noise rather than pure tones, and phase cancellation in particular is therefore extremely difficult (if not impossible) to achieve. Some suppressor manufacturers claim to use phase cancellation in their designs.

From a physics standpoint, supersonic cartridge loads are impractical to suppress past the levels that are merely hearing-safe for the shooter due to the sonic boom emitted by the bullet, and cartridges such as .22 LR and .45 ACP have long been recognized as the easiest to suppress even if using technology dating back to the 1940s.

=== Captive-piston silencer ===
Kinematics of the PSS pistol

Another silencer technology uses a captive piston cartridge; examples are the Smith & Wesson Quiet Special Purpose Revolver (QSPR), the Soviet and Russian PSS silent pistol, the Russian OTs-38 Stechkin silent revolver, and the Russian MTs-116M suppressed sniper rifle, a 12.7mm silenced development of the 7.62mm MTs-116M. The large calibre allows the bullet to be fired at subsonic speed, eliminating a major source of noise, while retaining as much accuracy, range, and effectiveness as possible, despite its reduced velocity. All of these weapons use special, very expensive, captive-piston ammunition; QSPR ammunition resembled metal-cased .410-bore shotgun shells. The cartridge case internally works as a piston to trap the gases; the piston pushes the bullet, but the gases are retained in the cartridge case instead of being expelled noisily. In tests of the PSS, the sound pressure level was 124.6dB, similar to a suppressed .22 rimfire pistol. The ammunition itself, rather than the weapon, is silent; in the US each individual round is considered to be a silencer, subject to regulations on silencers.

=== Improvised silencers ===
Improvised silencers have been made from a variety of materials. In 2015, Los Angeles County sheriff deputies recovered a Sa vz. 26 submachine gun with an automobile oil filter attached. In the United States, improvised silencers are governed by the same laws as manufactured ones; an improvised muzzle device that reduces sound signature, regardless of original intent, is regulated as a silencer.

== Characteristics ==
Rear of a suppressor with the Nielsen device protruding (completely assembled)

Retaining ring unscrewed and Nielsen device partially removed

Nielsen device completely removed and disassembled

Rear of suppressor showing the rotational indexing system incorporated into some Nielsen devices

Functionally, a suppressor is meant to diminish the report of a discharged round, or make its sound unrecognizable. Other sounds emanating from the weapon remain unchanged. Even subsonic bullets make distinct sounds by their passage through the air and striking targets, and supersonic bullets produce a small sonic boom, resulting in a ballistic crack. Semi-automatic and fully automatic firearms also make distinct noises as their actions cycle, ejecting the fired cartridge case and loading a new round.

Aside from reductions in volume, suppressors tend to alter the sound to something that is not identifiable as a gunshot. This reduces or eliminates attention drawn to the shooter. A Finnish expression dating from the Winter War says that "a silencer does not make a soldier silent, but it does make him invisible." Silencers are particularly useful in enclosed spaces where the sound, flash and pressure effects of a weapon being fired are amplified. Such effects may disorient the shooter, affecting situational awareness, concentration and accuracy, and can permanently damage hearing very quickly.

As the suppressed sound of firing is overshadowed by ballistic crack, observers can be deceived as to the location of the shooter, often from 90 to 180 degrees from his actual location. However, counter-sniper tactics can include gunfire locators, such as the U.S. Boomerang system, where sensitive microphones are coupled to computers running algorithms, and use the ballistic crack to detect and localize the origin of the shot.

There are advantages to using a silencer that are not related to sound suppression. Hunters using centerfire rifles find silencers bring various important benefits that outweigh the extra weight and resulting change in the firearm's center of gravity. The most important advantage of a suppressor is the hearing protection for the shooter as well as his or her companions. Many hunters have suffered permanent hearing damage due to someone else firing a high-caliber gun too closely without warning. By reducing noise, recoil and muzzle-blast, it also enables the firer to follow through calmly on their first shot and fire a further carefully aimed shot without delay if necessary. Wildlife of all kinds are often confused as to the direction of the source of a well-suppressed shot. In the field, however, the comparatively large size of a centerfire rifle suppressor can cause unwanted noise if it bumps or rubs against vegetation or rocks, so many users cover them with neoprene sleeves.

Silencers reduce firing recoil, primarily by diverting and trapping the propellant gas. The gas generally has much less mass than the projectile, but it exits the muzzle at multiples of the projectile velocity, so reducing the speed and quantity of the gas expelled can significantly reduce the total momentum of the matter (gas and projectile) leaving the barrel, the negation of which, because momentum is conserved, is transferred to the gun as recoil. Paulson et al., discussing low-velocity pistol calibers, suggest the recoil reduction is around 15%. With high-velocity calibers, recoil reduction runs in the range of 20–30%. The added mass of the suppressor—normally 300 to 500 grams—also helps to manage the recoil.

A suppressor also cools the hot gases coming out of the barrel enough that most of the lead-laced vapor that leaves the barrel condenses inside the silencer, reducing the amount of lead that might be inhaled by the shooter and others around them. However, in auto-loading actions, this might be offset by increased back pressure, which results in propellant gas blowing back into a shooter's face through the chamber during case ejection.

=== Subsonic ammunition ===
Kinematics of a Nielsen Device

In weapons firing supersonic ammunition, the bullet itself produces a loud and very sharp sound as it leaves the muzzle in excess of the speed of sound and gradually reducing speed as it travels downrange. This is a small sonic boom, and is referred to in the firearm field as ballistic crack or sonic signature. Subsonic ammunition eliminates this sound, but at the cost of lower velocity, resulting in decreased range and much decreased muzzle energy, thus lessening effectiveness on the target; this can be compensated for by increasing bullet weight. For example, if the muzzle velocity is reduced from 2,700 ft/s (820 m/s) (common for the .308 Winchester, for example) to a subsonic 950 ft/s (290 m/s), the muzzle energy is reduced by a factor of 8. Military marksmen and police units may use subsonic ammunition in suppressed rifles when minimal noise is more important than range and energy.

However, the numeric effectiveness of subsonic rounds is, again, misrepresented by media. Independent testing of commercially available firearm suppressors with commercially available subsonic rounds has found that .308 subsonic rounds decreased the volume at the muzzle by 10 to 12dB when compared to the same caliber of suppressed supersonic ammunition. When combined with silencers, the subsonic .308 rounds metered between 121 and 137 dB.

The ballistic crack depends on the speed of sound, which in turn depends mainly on air temperature. At sea level, an ambient temperature of 70 °F (21 °C), and under normal atmospheric conditions, the speed of sound is approximately 1,140 feet per second (350 m/s). Bullets that travel near the speed of sound are considered transonic, which means that the airflow over the surface of the bullet, which at points travels faster than the bullet itself, can break the speed of sound. Pointed bullets, which gradually displace air, can get closer to the speed of sound than round- or snub-nosed bullets before becoming transonic.

Special cartridges have been developed for use with a silencer. These cartridges use very heavy bullets, combined with a lighter powder load, to keep the bullet subsonic. A good example of this is the .300 Whisper cartridge, which is formed from a necked-up .221 Remington Fireball cartridge case. The subsonic .300 Whisper fires up to a 250-grain (16 g), .30 caliber bullet at about 980 feet per second (300 m/s), generating about 533 foot-pounds (723 J) of energy at the muzzle. While this is similar to the energy available from the .45 ACP pistol cartridge, the reduced diameter, and streamlined shape of the heavy .30 caliber bullet provides far better external ballistic performance, improving range substantially.

The .300 Blackout is another cartridge that was largely developed for use with a silencer, it was also based on the .221 Fireball and the .223 Remington as well, and is essentially a higher pressure .300 Whisper. It was originally developed in 2009 for the U.S. military, who wanted a .30 caliber cartridge that was more powerful and more versatile than the 5.56x45mm when fired from the M4's shorter 14.5 in (370 mm) barrel, as the 5.56mm was designed for the M16's 20 in (510 mm) barrel, and would also function in the M16/M4/AR-15 platform and STANAG magazine with only a barrel swap. The other requirement the military requested was a round that would have superior functionality in a suppressor, with subsonic loads that had better terminal performance and quieter sound, as they found 5.56mm subsonic loads were seriously lacking in power. This led to the .300 Blackout, the case design allows it to have a wide range of bullet weights and muzzle velocities, with its supersonic loads commonly using 110–160 gr (7.1–10.4 g) bullets with muzzle velocities of 2,400–1,850 ft/s (730–560 m/s) (respectively) and roughly 1,300 ft⋅lbf (1,800 N⋅m) of muzzle energy; conversely common subsonic .300 Blackout loads use bullet weights of 190–220 gr (12–14 g) with muzzle velocities of 1,070–1,020 ft/s (330–310 m/s) (respectively) and a muzzle energy of about 480–560 ft⋅lbf (650–760 N⋅m). Most .300 Blackout suppressors with subsonic rounds have their sound level reduced to between 135 to 130 dB, with an average decrease of 36 dB (8 times quieter), which has led the .300 Blackout become one of the most popular rounds to use with a suppressor, and one of the most popular semi-automatic sporting rifle rounds period.

9×19mm Parabellum, a very popular caliber for suppressed shooting, can use almost any factory-loaded 147 grains (9.5 g) weight round to achieve subsonic performance. These 147gr weight bullets typically have a velocity of 900–980 feet per second (270–300 m/s), which is less than the 1,140 feet per second (350 m/s) speed of sound.

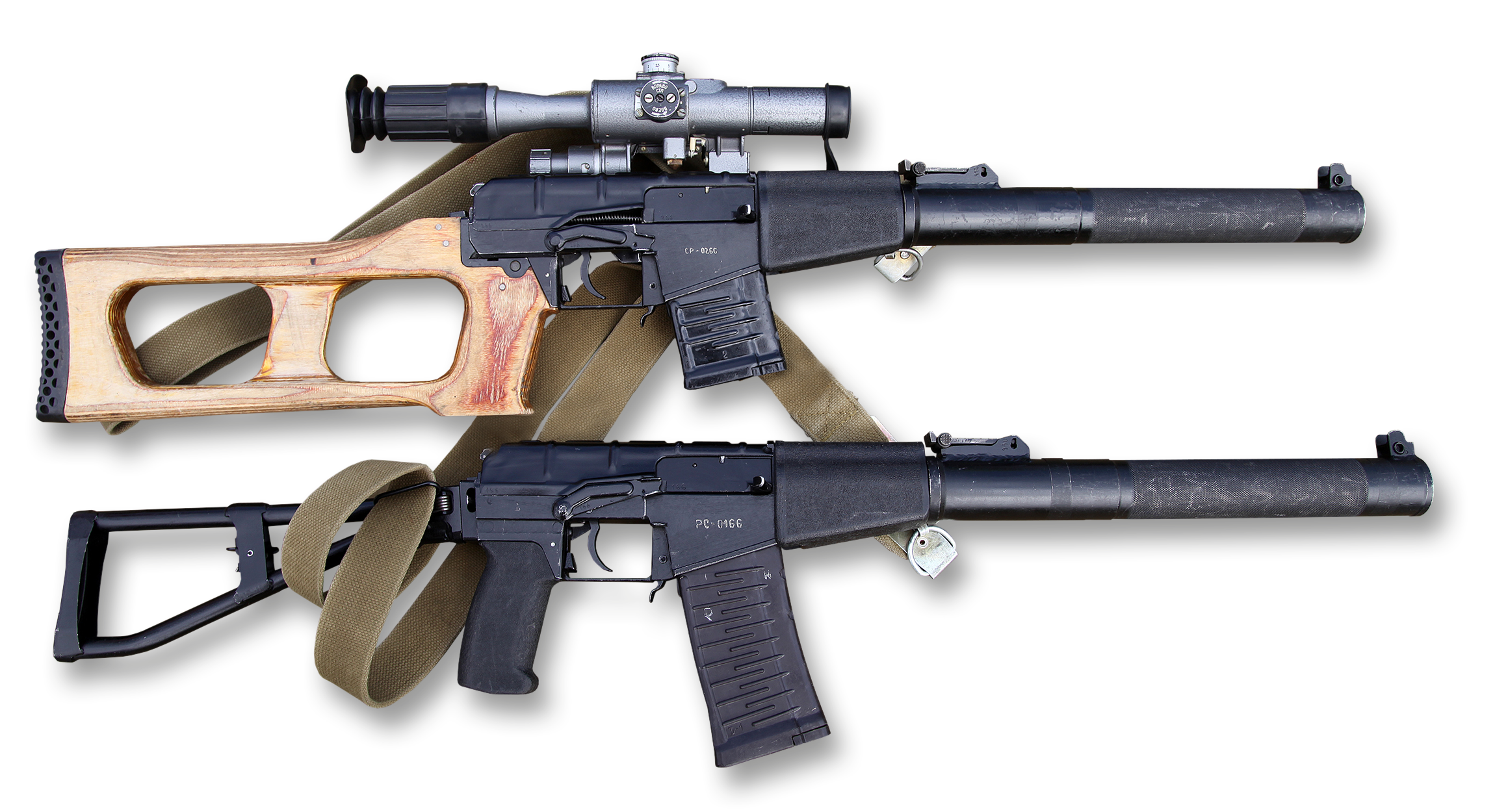
Integral suppressor on VSS Vintorez sniper rifle and AS Val assault rifle

The Soviet/Russian armor-piercing 9×39mm ammunition used in rifles such as the AS Val has a high subsonic ballistic coefficient, high retained downrange energy, high sectional density, and moderate recoil.

Without using subsonic ammunition, the muzzle velocity of a supersonic bullet can be lowered by other means, before it leaves the barrel. Some silencer designs, called integrals, do this by allowing gas to bleed off along the length of the barrel before the projectile exits. The MP5SD is an example of this, with holes right after the chamber of the barrel used to reduce a regular 115 or 124gr ammunition to subsonic velocities.

== Effectiveness ==
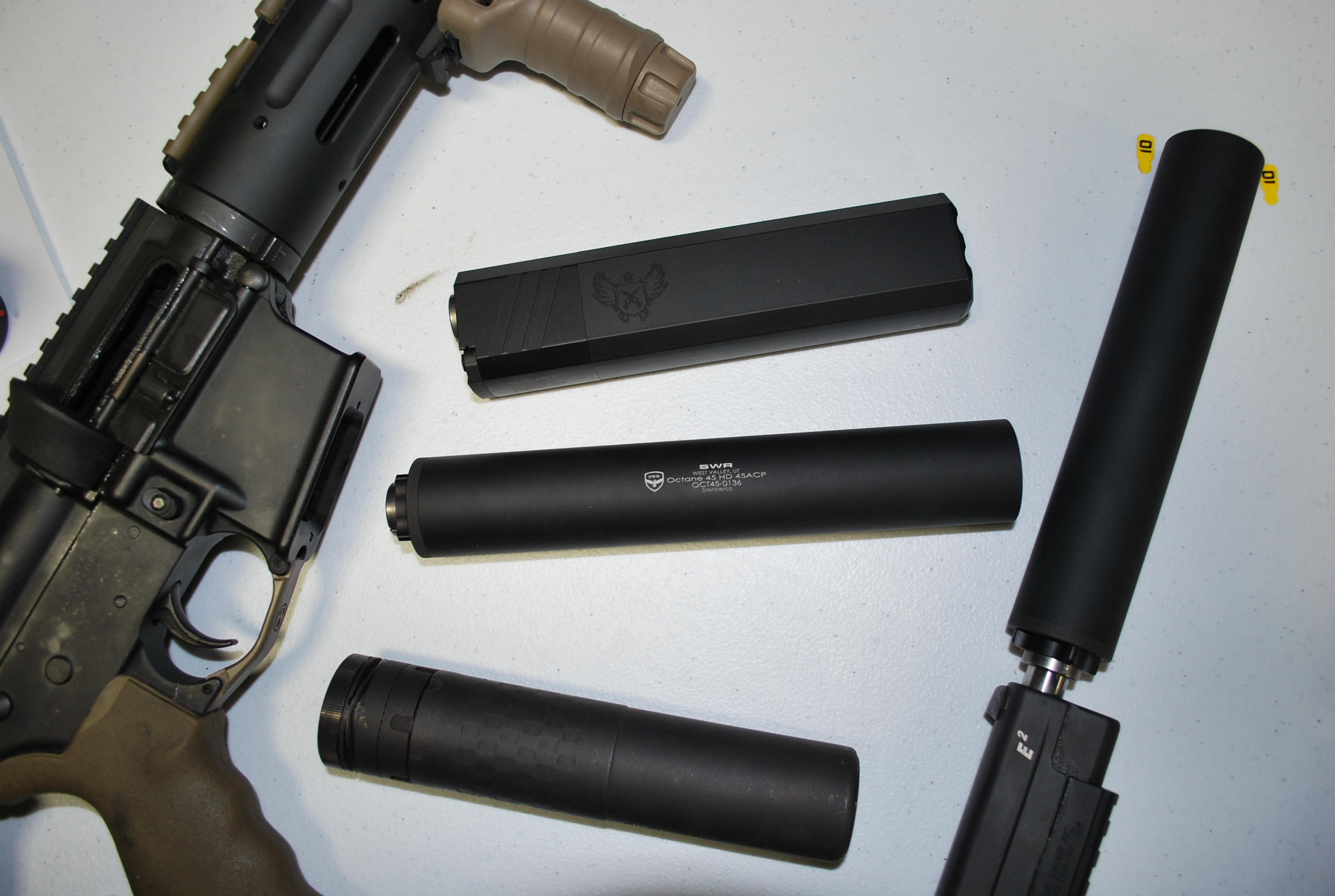
Firearm suppressors including the SilencerCo Osprey 9, SWR Octane 45, and SilencerCo Saker 5.56

Live tests by independent reviewers of numerous commercially available suppressors find that even low-power, unsuppressed .22LR handguns produce gunshots over 160 decibels. A recent study of various suppressors reported peak sound pressure level reductions between 17dB and 24dB. Another study evaluated two calibers of rifle and nine suppressors, .223 caliber AR-15 (five suppressors) and .300 caliber AAC Blackout (four suppressors), and reported noise reduction of the peak sound level pressure between 7 dB and 32 dB. The De Lisle carbine, a British World War II suppressed rifle used in small numbers by Special Forces, was recorded at 85.5 dB in official firing tests.

Comparatively, ear protection commonly used while shooting provides 18 to 32 dB of sound reduction at the ear. For additional comparison, chainsaws, rock concerts, rocket engines, pneumatic drills, small firecrackers, and ambulance sirens are rated between 100 and 140 dB.

While some consider the noise reduction of a suppressor significant enough to permit safe shooting without hearing protection ("hearing safe"), noise-induced hearing loss may occur at 85 time-weighted-average decibels or above if exposed for a prolonged period, and suppressed gunshots regularly meter above 130 dB. However, the U.S. Occupational Safety and Health Administration uses 140 dB as the safety cutoff for impulsive noise, which has led most U.S. manufacturers to advertise sub-140dB silencers as hearing safe. Current OSHA standards would allow less than a single second of cumulative exposure to impact noise over 130 dB per 24 hours.

The United States Department of Veterans Affairs has stated that the most prominent disability in former servicemen is reduced and damaged hearing and that the United States Marine Corps' decision to purchase and use suppressors would solve this problem.

Traditional measures of suppressor noise reduction have focused on the change in the peak sound pressure level between suppressed and unsuppressed conditions. Because of the MIL-STD 1474D, the ability to reduce the suppressed level to below 140 dB peak sound pressure level (dB pSPL) was the goal for firearm suppressor manufacturers. In MIL-STD 1474D, materiel that produced peak levels below 140 dB were not subject to a requirement to wear hearing protection devices that could affect a person's situational awareness. Firearms have different levels of perceived loudness. This difference can be related to the peak sound pressure level but also to the initial duration of the impulse. A longer initial duration (also known as the A-duration) can create a sensation that impulses with the same sound pressure level (dB pSPL) are louder because the muzzle blast interacts with the body for a longer period of time. For instance, the peak levels of a Remington model 788, 22" barrel .308 caliber, 150-grain bullet rifle and a Winchester Mossberg 4x4, 24" barrel .300 caliber, 150 grain bullet rifle were 169 and 171 dB pSPL, respectively. The mean A-duration of the .308 Remington was 0.35 milliseconds and the A-duration of the .300 Winchester was 0.42 ms, 20% longer. When the impulses' peak sound pressure levels are normalized to the same level (170 dB pSPL), the equivalent energy of the .300 Winchester was approximately 1 dB greater than that of the .308 Remington. In other words, greater energy was present for the impulse with a longer A-duration.

Measurements relying upon sound level meters are often unable to capture the waveform details to accurately describe the impulse.

== Regulation ==
The legal regulation of silencers varies widely around the world. In some nations, such as Finland, France, and New Zealand some or all types of suppressors are essentially unregulated and are sold through retail stores or by mail-order. In other countries, their possession or use is more restricted.

=== Europe ===
Unregulated Legal to own for firearms owners (for reasons like hunting, sport, self-defence or no reason asked) Legal to own with special permit only Prohibited Missing or non-clear info

- Czech Republic: C-category accessory, i.e. they are available to gun license holders and subject to registration
- Denmark: the Danish Weapons And Explosives Law makes the unlicensed possession of a silencer illegal. As of 7 May 2014 it is legal to own and use silencers for hunting.
- Finland: a firearm silencer is classified as a firearm part by law. Purchasing a suppressor requires a firearm ownership permit, which must be shown to the vendor at the moment of purchase.
- France: silencers for rimfire pistols are sold without government oversight in France.
- Germany: a silencer is treated the same in the eyes of the law as the weapon it is designed for. Accordingly, suppressors for air guns, which can be purchased by anyone over 18 years of age, can be purchased by anyone over 18. A hunting license allows the purchase of a suppressor for long guns for centerfire ammunition.
- Italy: a silencer is considered a restricted firearms accessory, which can only be sold to the armed forces, police and government agencies.(Law april 18 1975 Art. 2). The exception to this is any silencers acquired before 4 November 2013, where these items can be freely retained and used. No registration is needed for these.
- Norway: not regulated and can be purchased by anyone for any firearm. No licence or permit is necessary.
- Poland: In 2020, a new amendment to the Arms and Ammunition Act allowed police to issue permits for firearms with sound suppressors for hunting permits. Hunters are allowed to use them only for the sanitary shooting of animals.
- Portugal: Silencers "Sound Moderators" are permitted for hunters and sport shooters since 22 September 2019. As they are only classified as accessories, prior authorization is not required for their acquisition, and they can be purchased by gun license holders upon presentation of the respective gun license. Moderators don't need to be registered
- Russian Federation: firearm silencers use (legally defined as "devices for noiseless shooting") is prohibited, and dealers are prohibited from selling them, but there is no penalty for purchasing or possession of such devices.
- Spain: firearms silencers are prohibited by the Decree regulating firearms (technically, the law just references the Decree). Airgun "moderators" are not explicitly mentioned, so they are tolerated. Ambiguous rulings by authorities are common.
- Sweden: Since 1 July 2022, silencers are regulated the same way as ammunition. Anyone who has the right to possess a certain weapon for shooting may possess silencers that fit the weapon.
- United Kingdom: Until 2026, sound moderators were regulated as controlled components and required an entry on the owner's firearm certificate (FAC). However, in 2024 the UK Government undertook a consultation on removing sound moderators from licensing controls entirely and on 29 June 2026 they were deregulated in England, Wales and Scotland. As a result, it is now legal for any firearm or shotgun certificate holder to buy and possess sound moderators in those countries, although they remain subject to firearms licensing controls in Northern Ireland.

=== North America ===
Legality of firearm suppressors by US jurisdiction Legal Legal, but illegal to hunt with Illegal

- In Canada, any device designed to muffle or stop the sound of a firearm is classed as a "prohibited device" under the Criminal Code, effectively making them illegal for private individuals to own, use, transport, or import. See Gun politics in Canada.
- In the United States, taxes and strict regulations affect the manufacture and sale of silencers under the National Firearms Act. Since January 1, 2026, the federal transfer tax on silencers has been $0 under the One Big Beautiful Bill Act. In August 2026 a federal court barred enforcement of the National Firearms Act's registration rules for silencers against the plaintiffs in Silencer Shop Foundation v. ATF. As a matter of enforcement discretion, the Justice Department will not enforce the Act against any person for the domestic making, possession or transfer of silencers. They are legal for individuals to possess and use for lawful purposes in 42 of the 50 states. The eight states that have explicitly banned any civilian from possessing a silencer are: California, Delaware, Hawaii, Illinois, Massachusetts, New Jersey, New York, Rhode Island, and the District of Columbia. Connecticut allows silencer ownership but prohibits using silencers while hunting. The federal legal requirements to manufacture a silencer in the United States are enumerated in Title 26, Chapter 53 of the United States Code. Individual states and several municipalities also have their specific requirements. Federal law provides severe penalties for crimes of violence committed using firearms equipped with silencers, with a minimum prison sentence of 30 years.

=== Oceania ===
- In Australia, silencers were made prohibited under the Weapons Prohibition Act 1998, use and ownership of silencers is generally limited to government, security, and law enforcement use only. However, following the Firearms Regulation 2017 some states like New South Wales and Queensland changed the law to allow certain individuals with a firearms license to obtain a Prohibited Weapon Permit from their state police to legally possess and use a silencer. Silencer permits are typically only issued to professional and occupational shooters like state licensed hunters for animal population control, competition shooters that belong to a government licensed gun club, hunters hunting on private land that belong to a government approved hunting club, and farmers that have a depredation license to shoot varmints, pests, and predators threatening their livestock.
- In New Zealand, following firearm law changes in April 2019, suppressors could still be fitted to a standard firearm.

== See also ==
- Title II weapons
- Piston effect § Tunnel boom, for a similar device but far bigger, on ends of railway tunnels
- Sound blimp, a device to reduce the noise made by a camera's shutter

=== Other muzzle devices ===
- Muzzle brake
- Flash suppressor
- Muzzle booster
- Muzzle shroud
- Blank-firing adapter
