= TKB-506 =

- Type: Pistol
- Place of origin: Soviet Union

Production history
- Designer: Igor Stechkin
- Designed: 1955
- Manufacturer: Tula Arms Plant
- Variants: TKB-506, TKB-506A

Specifications
- Mass: 0.44 kg (0.47 with ammo)
- Length: 11 cm
- Barrel length: 2.5 cm
- Caliber: 7.62 mm SP-2
- Barrels: 3
- Action: single-shot
- Muzzle velocity: 170 m/s
- Sights: None

The TKB-506 (Russian: ТКБ-506) was a small handgun designed to look like a cigarette case, developed by Igor Stechkin, allegedly on the orders of the KGB.

== Design ==
The dimensions of TKB-506 are 11 x 9.2 x 2 cm. Weighing 0.44 kg empty, it could fire three 7.62 mm rounds, each held in a separate barrel only 2.5 cm long and each having a separate striker. Device number 10 can now be seen at the Tula arms museum.

== Variant ==
=== TKB-506A ===
The TKB-506A had an identical armament, and similar weight of around 0.47 kg with ammo, but was even smaller (7.4 cm height) by doing away with the cut-through hole used for the trigger in TKB-506.

== Users ==
- Soviet Union

== See also ==
- List of Russian weaponry
- NRS-2
- S4M
