= List of modern Russian small arms and light weapons =

The following is a list of modern Russian small arms and light weapons which were in service in 2024:

== Handguns ==
=== Revolvers ===
Weapon	Caliber	In service	Variants	Photo	Country
Nagant M1895; 7 shot revolver	7.62×38mmR (7.62 mm Nagant)	1895–present still used by some police and security forces	Single action "Private's model", early and WW1 production, most converted to double action Interwar Double action "Officer's model", produced pre-WW1, WW1, interwar and WW2; Suppressed model produced after 1931; Civilian variants produced post-WW2, including long barrel carbine Shadow-7 (caliber 5.45×18mm) in 2020; Belgian, Greek, Luxembourgish, Norwegian, Polish, Spanish and Swedish variants	A Nagant M1895 produced in 1941 by the Tula Arsenal with its 7.62×38mmR ammunition	RussiaSoviet Union; Belgium

=== Pistols ===
Weapon	Caliber	In service	Variants	Photo	Country
TT pistol	7.62x25mm Tokarev	1930–present in use in some reserve forces and carried by military officers	TT-30 TT-33 1933; K54 (Vietnamese clone); M48 (Hungarian modification); PW wz. 33 (Polish clone); Type 54 (Chinese clone); Type 68 (North Korean clone); TTC (Romanian clone); Zastava M57 (Yugoslav clone)	TT pistol	Soviet Union
Makarov pistol	9×18mm Makarov	1951–present still widely used by police, military and security forces	IZh-70, IZh-71, MP-71 commercial variants: 9×18mm Makarov, .380 ACP; PB (pistol) (9×18mm Makarov) integrally suppressed variant; PMM (9×18mm Makarov) modernized version; OTs-35 (9×18mm Makarov) attaching compensator (upgrade for regular PMs); TKB-023 (9×18mm Makarov) experimental variant with polymer frame, early 1960s; Baikal-442 (9×18mm Makarov) export sporting version	Makarov pistol	Russia; Soviet Union
PSM pistol	5.45×18mm	1973–present still issued to high ranking government officials, police, military & security forces	IZh-75 (commercial); Baikal-441 (.25 ACP)	PSM pistol	Russia; Soviet Union
P-96 pistol	9×19mm Parabellum (9×18mm Makarov)	2000s–present	P-96S (9×17mm)	P-96M	Russia
OTs-27 Berdysh	9×18mm Makarov (9×19mm Parabellum) (7.62×25mm Tokarev)	1994–present used as service pistol in Ministry of Internal Affairs and other law enforcement.	Ots-27 (9×18mm Makarov); OTs-27-2 (9×19mm Parabellum); Ots-27-7 (7.62×25mm Tokarev)	OTs-27 Berdysh	Russia
OTs-33 Pernach	9×18mm Makarov	1996-present designed to replace the Stechkin APS in various special OMON units, the Russian Ministry of Internal Affairs, and other paramilitary units			Russia
GSh-18	9×19mm Parabellum	2000–present one of the standard sidearms for all branches of Russian Armed Forces		GSh-18	Russia
MP-443 Grach; Yarygin pistol	9×19mm Parabellum	2003–present one of the standard sidearms for all branches of Russian Armed forces	6P35 Yarygin (prototype); 9×19mm Parabellum MP-446 Viking (commercial); 9×19mm Parabellum MP-446C (sporting variant); 9×19mm Parabellum	MP-443	Russia
SR-1 Vektor Serdyukov pistol	9×21mm Gyurza	2003–present sidearm utilized in limited numbers by the Spetsnaz	SR-1M; SR-1MP	SR-1M	Russia
Udav	9×21mm Gyurza	2019-present successfully passed official trials in January 2019, becoming approved for adoption by the Russian Army			Russia
Poloz pistol	9×19mm Parabellum	2020–present compact version Udav pistol intended primarily for Russian Police			Russia
Lebedev pistol	9×19mm Parabellum +P	PL-14 (prototype); PL-15 (full size); PL-15K (compact)		PLK	Russia

=== Special purpose ===
Weapon	Caliber	In service	Variants	Photo	Country
Stechkin APS; Stechkin automatic pistol select-fire machine-pistol	9×18mm Makarov	1951–present	AO-44 / APB (variant with attaching suppressor and steel wire stock)		Soviet Union
SPP-1 underwater pistol	4.5×39mm	1971–present	SPP-1M (updated model)		Soviet Union
PSS silent pistol also called MSS "Vul" ("wool" in English)	7.62×41mm SP-4	1983–present replaced all previous noiseless pistols	PSS-2 (modernized; 7.62×45mm SP-16)		Soviet Union
NRS-2; NR-2 (survival kit instead of pistol)	7.62×41mm SP-4	1986–present	NRS (initial variant; 7.62×35mm SP-3) knife / single-shot noiseless pistol designed to complement the PSS		Soviet Union
OTs-38 Stechkin silent revolver	7.62×41mm SP-4	2002–present			Russia

== Submachine guns ==
Weapon	Caliber	In service	Variants	Photo	Country
PP-19 Bizon	9×18mm Makarov	1996–present succeeded by Vityaz-SN	Bizon-2 (improved variant): 2 (9×18mm Makarov); 2B (configuration with attaching suppressor); 2-01 (9×19mm Parabellum); 2-02 (.380 ACP); 2-03 (integral suppressor); 2-07 (7.62×25mm Tokarev, box magazine); Bizon-3 (improved variant)	helical magazine	Russia
SR-2 Veresk	9×21mm Gyurza	1999–present	SR-2M		Russia
Vityaz-SN closed bolt blowback operated Kalashnikov variant	9×19mm Parabellum	1990s–present standard SMG for all branches of Russian military and police forces	Vityaz-SN		Russia
PP-2000	9×19mm Parabellum	2008–present standard SMG for all branches of police forces	PP-2000		Russia
PP-91 KEDR	9×18mm Makarov	1994–present used by parts of Ministry of Internal Affairs	PP-71 (prototype); PP-90-01 (variant with integrated silencer); PP-9 "Klin" (1996–2002 for MVD; 9×18mm PMM)		Russia
PPK-20	9×19mm Parabellum				

=== Special purpose ===
Weapon	Caliber	In service	Variants	Photo	Country
OTs-02 Kiparis Submachine Gun 30-round magazine	9×18mm Makarov	1991–present			Soviet Union
PP-90 Folding Submachine gun	9×18mm Makarov	1990s used by MVD			Russia; Soviet Union
PP-90M1 Submachine gun Helical 64-round magazine	9×19mm Parabellum	1990s used by Spetsnaz			Russia

== Shotguns ==
Weapon	Caliber	In service	Variants	Photo	Country
KS-23 Pump Action Shotgun	23x75mmR	1970–present, used by the Ministry of Internal Affairs and Border Guard Service			Soviet Union
RMB-93 Pump-action shotgun	12-gauge shotgun	1993 Used by Police of Russia and other security forces			Russia
Saiga-12 Semi-Automatic Shotgun	12-gauge shotgun, 16, 20, .410 gauge shotgun	Late 1990s Used by Russian armed forces			Russia
Molot Bekas-M Pump-action sporting shotgun	12 gauge, 20 gauge 28 gauge, .410 bore and 32-gauge shotgun	1999 Used by Police of Russia and other security forces			Russia
Vepr-12 Magazine fed semi-automatic shotgun	12 gauge	2003 Used by Police of Russia and other security forces			Russia
MTs255 Double action 5 round internal revolving cylinder type shotgun	12 gauge, 20 gauge, 28 gauge, 32 gauge, .410 bore shotgun	1993 Used by Police of Russia and Russian armed forces and other security forces	MTs255 (МЦ255) – civilian version, has a permanent wooden butt and fore-end. The guns are available in 12 gauge, 20, 28 and 32 gauges, and .410 bore.[1] At present, it is not commercially available, only parts are available on request. MTs255-12 (МЦ255-12) – police version (for ammunition 12/70 and 12/76), designed for law enforcement and security agencies, is distinguished by accessories made of black plastic, folding stock and a "Picatinny rail" bar for attaching sighting devices.		Russia; Soviet Union

== Rifles ==
=== Bolt-action ===
Weapon	Caliber	In service	Variants	Photo	Country
Mosin–Nagant "3-line rifle" "Mosin"	7.62×54mmR	1891–present still used by some militia forces sniper rifle commonly used by police and military snipers	1891 infantry 1891 dragoon 1891 cossack 1891/1910; 1891/1930; 1891/1952 KGB sniper 1907 carbine 1938 carbine 1944 carbine		Russia; Soviet Union
SV-98	7.62×51mm NATO; 7.62×54mmR.338 Lapua Magnum	2003–present	Modernized (1)	SV-98	Russia
VKS sniper rifle	12.7×55mm STs-130	2004–present	Some variants are in deployment		Russia
Lobaev Sniper Rifle	.338 Federal (.308 Winchester).408 Cheyenne Tactical.300 Winchester Magnum.338 Lapua Magnum; 6.5×47mm Lapua; 6.5-284 Norma.40 Lobaev Whisper.375 Cheyenne Tactical	2010–present	SVL variant chambered for .408 Cheyenne Tactical is used by the Federal Protective Service of Russia. Other variants include OVL, SVLK-14S, SVLK-14M, DXL, TSVL and DVL.		Russia; United Arab Emirates
Orsis T-5000	7.62×51mm NATO (.308 Winchester).300 Winchester Magnum.338 Lapua Magnum; 6.5×47mm Lapua.375 H&H Magnum.260 Remington	2017–present	ORSIS 12.7, chambered in either 12.7x108mm or 12.7x99mm NATO/.50 BMG		Russia

=== Semi-automatic ===
Weapon	Caliber	In service	Variants	Photo	Country
SKS / Simonov self-loading carbine	7.62×39mm	1945–present still used by some police & militia forces, also used as ceremonial rifle		SKS	Soviet Union
Dragunov SVD	7.62×54mmR	1963–present	SVU (bullpup); SVDK (9.3×64mm); SVDS (folding stock): 590mm barrel (SVDS-D)	SVD	Soviet Union

=== Selective-fire ===
Weapon	Caliber	In service	Variants	Photo	Country
АК-47 / AK	7.62×39mm	1949–present replaced by AKM can still be found in armories.	AKS folding stock; AK(S)N night scope rail; Issue 1949 stamped receiver; Issue 1951 milled receiver; Issue 1954 lightened milled receiver variant	AK-47	Soviet Union
AKM modernized AK-47	7.62×39mm	1959–present replaced by AK-74 still in use by police and militia forces	S-04-M, A-55 prototypes; AKMS folding stock; AKM(S)N night scope rail; AKM(S)L flash suppressor & night scope rail; RPK (machine gun)	AKM	Soviet Union
AK-74	5.45×39mm	1974–present replaced by AK-74M can still be found in large numbers	40-P/720-P/A-017, A-3 prototypes; AKS 74 (folding stock); AKS 74; AK(S)-74N night scope rail; RPK 74 (machine gun); AKS-74U (carbine)	AK-74	Soviet Union
AK-74M modernized AK-74	5.45×39mm	1991–present current issue	A-60/61 (prototypes); AK-105 (carbine); RPK-74M (machine gun); AK-101 (5.56×45mm); AK-102 (carbine); RPK-201 (machine gun); AK-103 (7.62×39mm); AK-104 (carbine); RPKM (machine gun)	AK-74M	Soviet Union; Russia
AN-94 / Nikonov; Assault Rifle	5.45×39mm	1997–present used in limited numbers too expensive for general issue		AN-94	Russia
AM-17	5.45×39mm	2017-The AM-17 is in limited use with FSB, FSO, Russian National Guard			Russia
AK-12 / AK-15	5.45×39mm 7.62×39mm	Accepted into service in January 2018 in a small quantity of ~50,000 units. A new revision was released in August 2020. All new rifles manufactured will be the revised version. All of the previous revision rifles will be upgraded to the latest revision. Changes include an updated pistol grip, buttstock and many other changes.		AK-12 5.45×39mm assault rifle	Russia
A-545 / A-762 modernized AEK-971, also known as KORD assault rifle	5.45×39mm 7.62×39mm	In January 2018 it was announced that the rifle has been adopted in 5.45×39mm and 7.62×39mm chamberings by the Russian military. The first orders for the A-545 rifle were announced in mid-2020. It is believed these orders total about 500 assault rifles that were destined for Spetsnaz units and some Airborne personnel.		A-545 5.45×39mm assault rifle	Russia
AK-203	7.62×39mm	The AK-203 was developed in the 2010s by Kalashnikov Concern. The Indian Army is procuring 670,000 AK-203 assault rifles to replace the INSAS, through a contract with Russia.			Russia

=== Special purpose ===
Weapon	Caliber	In service	Variants	Photo	Country
APS underwater automatic rifle		1975–present		APS	Soviet Union
AS Val silent assault rifle	9×39mm	1980s–present	VSS Vintorez (sniper rifle)	AS Val	Soviet Union
9A-91 compact assault rifle	9×39mm	1993–present	VSK-94 (sniper rifle); A-9 (9×19mm Parabellum); A-7.62 (7.62×25mm Tokarev)	9A-91	Russia
AK-9 carbine, subsonic ammunition	9×39mm	2000s–present		AK-9	Russia
SR-3 Vikhr	9×39mm	1996-present	SR-3M and SR-3MP modernizations		Russia
ShAK-12 urban assault rifle	12.7×55mm STs-130	2010–present		Ash-12.7	Russia
ADS amphibious assault rifle	5.45×39mm / 5.45×39mm PSP	2013–present	Carbine A-91 (non-amphibious): 7.62×39mm, 5.56×45mm	ADS	Russia

=== Anti-materiel rifles ===
Weapon	Caliber	In service	Variants	Photo	Country
OSV-96 folding barrel	12.7×108mm	2000s–present	V-94 (early variant)	OSV-96	Russia
KSVK / ASVK / 6S8 / ASV Kord	12.7×108mm	1990s–present		ASVK	Russia

== Machine guns ==
=== Squad automatic weapons (SAWs)/ Light Machine Guns (LMGs) ===
Weapon	Caliber	In service	Variants	Photo	Country
RPD / Light Machine Gun	7.62×39mm	1945–present still used by special forces and militia forces		RPD Light Machine Gun	Soviet Union
RPK / Kalashnikov; Light Machine Gun	7.62×39mm	1959–present still used by police and militia forces	AKM (assault rifle) S-108(-M), P-55 prototypes RPKS (folding stock) RPK(S)N night scope rail RPK(S)L flash suppressor & night scope rail RPKM (modernized) RPK-203 (export variant) RPK-204 (7.62×51mm NATO)		Soviet Union
RPK-74	5.45×39mm	1974–present current issue	AK-74 (assault rifle) RPKS-74 (folding stock) RPK(S)-74N: night scope rail RPK-74M (modernized) RPK-201 (5.56×45mm NATO)	RPK-74	Soviet Union
RPK-16	5.45×39mm	2018–present		RPK-16	Russia
RPL-20	5.45×39mm	2020			Russia

=== General-purpose ===
Weapon	Caliber	In service	Variants	Photo	Country
PK machine gun Kalashnikov Machine Gun	7.62×54mmR	1961–present	PKM (modernized) PK(M)S (configuration with mount) PK(M)B (APC configuration) PKT(M) (tank variant) Pecheneg (rifle- caliber SAW)	PK	Soviet Union
Pecheneg machine gun Kalashnikov Machine Gun	7.62×54mmR	2001–present	PKM (modernized) PK(M)S (configuration with mount) PK(M)B (APC configuration) PKT(M) (tank variant) Pecheneg (rifle- caliber SAW)	PKM	Russia
AEK-999	7.62×54mmR	2008-present			Russia

=== Heavy Machine Guns (HMGs) ===
Weapon	Caliber	In service	Variants	Photo	Country
DShK 1938 / Degtyaryov-Shpagin Large-Calibre	12.7×108mm	1938–present	DShKM (Modernized version) Type 54 (Chinese unlicensed production) HMG PK-16 (Pakistani variant)	DShK	Soviet Union
KPV / Vladimirov; Machine Gun	14.5×114mm	1949–present	PKP (infantry variant; not to be confused with Pecheneg machine gun) KPVT (vehicle-mounted) ZPU-1 / 2 / 4 (AA mounts)	KPV	Soviet Union
NSV Utyos / Nikitin– Sokolov–Volkov	12.7×108mm	1971–present succeeded by Kord can still be found in large numbers	NSVT (vehicle-mounted); Utyos-M (naval twin-mount)	NSV	Soviet Union
Kord can be fired from bipod	12.7×108mm	1998–present		Kord	Russia

== Hand grenades ==
=== Fragmentation ===
Weapon	Weight	In service	Variants	Photo	Country
RGD-5 offensive fragmentation grenade	310g	1954–present replaced by RGN can still be found in large numbers		RGD-5	Soviet Union
RGO defensive fragmentation grenade	530g	1990s–present		RGO	Soviet Union
RGN offensive fragmentation grenade	290g	1990s–present		RGN	Soviet Union

=== Anti-tank ===
Weapon	Weight	In service	Variants	Photo	Country
RKG-3 shaped charge	1,070 g	1950–present still stockpiled succeeded by RPG-18 rocket launcher	RKG-3Ye (170 mm RHA); RKG-3YeM (220 mm RHA)	RKG-3	Soviet Union

== Grenade launchers ==
=== Stand-alone ===
Weapon	Caliber	In service	Variants	Photo	Country
RGS-50	50mm grenade	1989–present	RGS-50M		Soviet Union
RG-6 / 6G30	40mm caseless grenade (VOG-25M)	1994–present		RG-6	Russia
RGM-40 Kastet stand alone version of GP-30 with telescoping stock	40mm caseless grenade (VOG-25M)	late 1990s–present			Soviet Union
GM-94	43mm grenade (VGM-93)	2007–present		GM-94	Russia

=== Attached ===
Weapon	Caliber	In service	Variants	Photo	Country
Kalashnikov grenade launcher (cup type launcher)	uses special blank cartridge to launch standard RGD-5 hand-grenades also launches various riot control ammunition	mid 1950s–present		Kalashnikov Grenade Launcher	Soviet Union
GP-25 Kostyor	40mm caseless grenade (VOG-25M)	1978–present	BG-15 Mukha initial variant GP-30 Obuvka: 1989 issue 2000 issue GP-30M; GP-30U Granat (can be mounted on foreign rifles); GP-34 ()	AK-74M with GP-25	Soviet Union

=== Automatic grenade launchers ===
Weapon	Caliber	In service	Variants	Photo	Country
AGS-17 Plamya	30 mm VOG-17M / VOG-30 / GPD-30	1970s–present succeeded by AGS-30 & AGS-40 Balkan	AGS-17M modernized AG-17M naval version AG-17A (AP-30; Plamya-A) aircraft version	AGS-17	Soviet Union
AGS-30 Atlant light automatic grenade launcher	30 mm VOG-17M / VOG-30 / GPD-30	1995–present	TKB-722(K) prototype	AGS-30	Russia
AGS-40 Balkan automatic grenade launcher	40mm caseless 7P39 grenades	2017–present		AGS-40 Balkan	Russia

== Rocket launchers ==
=== General purpose ===
Weapon	Caliber	Penetration	In service	Variants	Photo
RPG-7	Anti-tank; PG-7VL "Luch"; 93mm, 2.6 kg, 1977 Tandem AT; PG-7VR "Rezyume"; 105mm, 4.5 kg, 1988 Thermobaric; TBG-7V "Tanin"; 105mm, 4.5 kg, 1988 Fragmentation; OG-7V "Oskolok"; 40mm, 2.0 kg, 1998 Outdated (AT); PG-7V (85/2.2/61); PG-7VM (70/2.0/69); PG-7VS (72/2.0/72)	260 mm (V); 300 mm (VM); 400 mm (VS); 500 mm (VL); 750 mm (VR)	1961–present still used in large numbers succeeded by RPG-30 & RPG-32	RPG-7D paratrooper RPG-7N/DN night vision scope RPG-7V improved optics RPG-7V1/D1 updated optics for PG-7VR and TBG-7V RPG-7V2/D2 universal optics RPG-7D3	RPG-7
RPG-16	58,3mm HEAT	300mm (RHA)	1970s–1990s		
RPG-26 Aglen (one-shot disposable launcher)	72.5mm	440 mm	1985–present	RShG-2 (combined warhead (light))	RPG-26
RPG-27 Tavolga (one-shot disposable launcher) medium AT rocket launcher	105mm	600 mm	1989–present	RShG-1 RMG	External:,
RPG-29 Vampir for ranges of 500–800 metres is installed on tripod	105mm (AT, thermobaric)	750 mm	1989–present		RPG-29
RPG-32 Hashim developed in cooperation with Jordan	72.5 and 105mm	650 mm	2008–present		
RPG-28 Klyukva (one-shot disposable launcher) heavy AT rocket launcher	125mm	~1000 mm	2011–present		
RPG-30 Kryuk (one-shot disposable launcher)	105mm	600 mm	2012–present		

=== Incendiary and thermobaric ===
Weapon	Caliber	In service	Variants	Photo
RPO Rys; Incendiary rocket launcher replaced the flamethrower in Soviet service	122mm	late 1970s–present succeeded by RPO-A Shmel		RPO
RPO-A Shmel (one-shot disposable launcher)	93mm	late 1980s–present succeeded by RPO-M	RPO-A: thermobaric RPO-Z: incendiary RPO-D: smoke warhead RPO-M: 90mm reusable launcher Bur: 62mm reusable launcher	RPO-A
MRO-A (one-shot disposable launcher)	72.5mm	2002–present	MRO-A: thermobaric MRO-Z: incendiary MRO-D: smoke warhead	MRO
Varna (Incendiary rocket launcher)		2005–present		

=== Special purpose ===
Weapon	Caliber	In service	Variants	Photo
Grad-P Light portable rocket system man-portable variant of BM-21 Grad MLRS	122mm 9M22M 10,800 / 15,000m aiming / max. range	1960s–present		Grad-P
DP-61 Duel	55mm depth charges	late 1970s–present supplemented by DP-64	MRG-1 Ogonyok: stationary variant with 7 launch tubes	External:
DP-64	45mm depth charges	1990–present		

== Recoilless rifles ==
Weapon	Caliber	In service	Variants	Photo
SPG-9 Kopyo	73mm	1962–present	SPG-9D paratrooper variant SPG-9(D)M modernized SPG-9(M)N/D(M)N night vision scope	SPG-9

== Mortars ==
Weapon	Caliber	In service	Variants	Photo
82-BM-37; M37; M1937; PM37	82mm	1936–present replaced by the Podnos can still be found in large numbers	M37M; M41; M43	
2B14 Podnos	82mm	1980s–present		
2B25 Gall suppressed mortar	82mm	2011–present		

== Anti-tank guided missiles ==
Weapon	Missile	Range	In service	Variants	Photo
9K111 Fagot / AT-4 Spigot	9M111	2,000m	1970–present	9M111M	9K113 Konkurs missile system (launcher and missile) and a 9M111M Faktoriya missile in launch tube (standing)
9M113 Konkurs / AT-5 Spandrel	9M113	4,000m	1974–present	9M113M	
9K115-2 Metis-M / AT-13 Saxhorn-2	9M131	1,000m/ 2,000m	1992–present	Metis-M / Metis-M1 HEAT tandem warhead, Armor penetration behind ERA 900–950 mm	
9K135 Kornet / AT-14 Spriggan replaced 9M113 Konkurs	9M133-1; 9M133F-1 — 9M133M-2; 9M133FM-2; 9M133FMX	5,500m — 8,000–10,000m	1998–present	Kornet-E (export); Kornet-D / EM	Kornet
9K11-2 Malyutka-2 / AT-3D Sagger D modernized Malyutka (1999)	9M14-2; 9M14-2M; 9M14-2P; 9M14-2F	3,000m — min. 400m	1999–present	Malyutka-2M	

== Man-portable air defense system ==
Weapon	Range	Altitude	In service	Variants	Photo
Igla / SA-18 Grouse succeeded by Igla-S	5,200m	3,500m	1981–present	Igla-1 (early variant; NATO reporting name: SA-16 Gimlet) Igla-D (paratrooper variant) Dzhigit (two-barrel stationary variant)	Igla
Igla-S / SA-24 Grinch succeeded by 9K333 Verba	6,000m	3,500m	2004–present		Igla-S
9K333 Verba	8,000m	4,500m	2014–present		9K333 Verba

== Landmines ==
Weapon	Type	In service	Variants	Photo
POMZ	Anti-personnel tripwire type fragmentation mine	1945 – late 1960s	POMZ-2; POMZ-2M	Yugoslav PMR-2A variant of POMZ anti-personnel mine, Balkans 1996
PMN mine	Anti-personnel	late 1950s – present	PMN-1; PMN-2; PMN-4	
OZM	anti-personnel bounding		OZM-3; OZM-4; OZM-72	
MON-50	anti-personnel directional (Claymore) type			
MON-90 larger version of MON-50	anti-personnel directional (Claymore) type			
MON-100	anti-personnel directional (Claymore) type			
MON-200 larger version of MON-100	anti-personnel directional (Claymore) type, can also be used against light-skinned vehicles and helicopters			
TM-57 mine	anti-tank			
TM-62 series of mines	anti-tank		TM-62M; TM-62B; TM-62D; TM-62P; TM-62T	
TM-72 mine	anti-tank stand-off magnetic fuze		TM-89	

== See also ==
- List of equipment of the Russian Ground Forces
- List of Russian weaponry makers
