= NR-40 =

Soviet combat knife

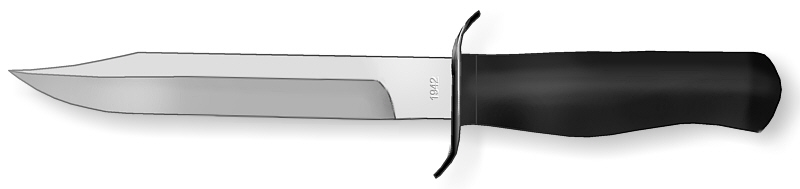
- A Soviet NR-40 knife
- Type: Combat knife
- Place of origin: USSR

Service history
- Wars: World War II

Specifications
- Blade type: Dagger
- Hilt type: Metal, hard leather or polymers
- Scabbard/sheath: Metal, hard leather or polymers
- Head type: Metal
- Haft type: Wood, checkered plastics

The NR-40 (Russian: нож разведчика 40, romanized: Nozh razvedchika 40, lit. 'Scout's knife 40', nicknamed as Finka) was a Soviet combat knife introduced in 1940 and used throughout World War II.

== History ==
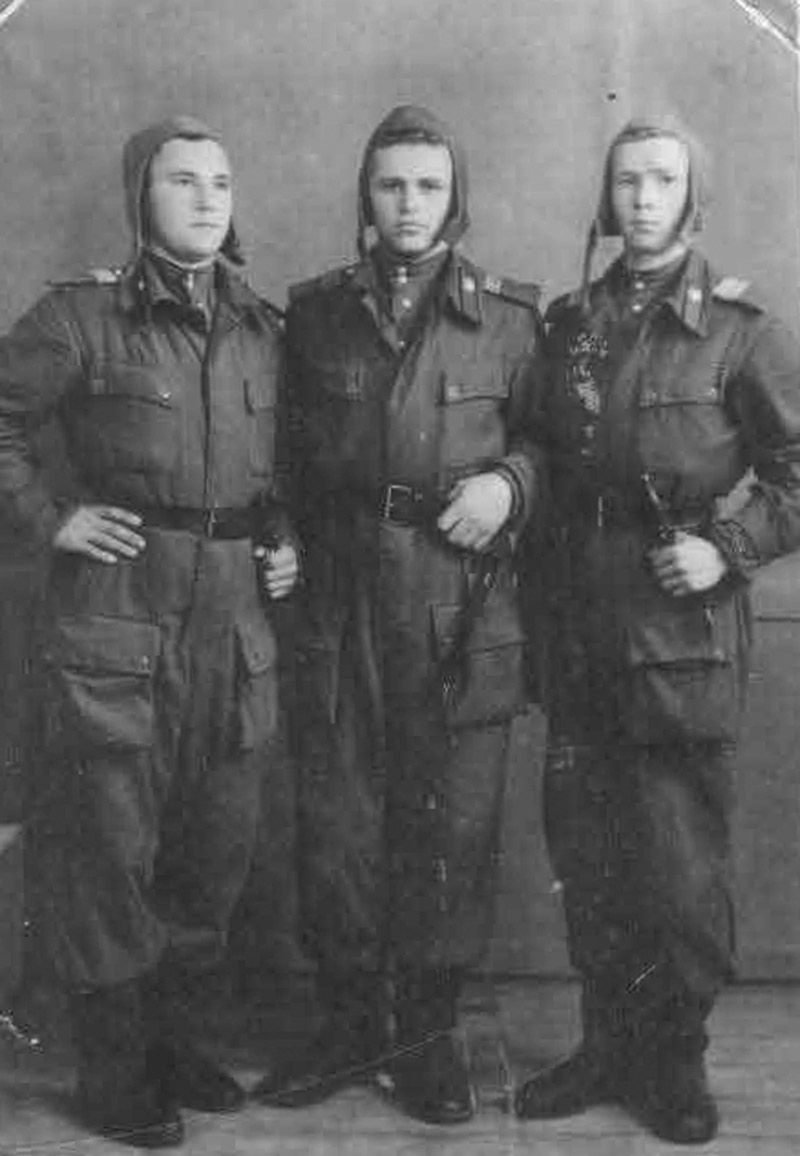
Soviet paratroopers, 1948. Note all-black NR-40s.

The Winter War revealed a number of deficiencies in Soviet weaponry; among other issues, the Soviet infantry lacked a good combat knife.

As a result, in 1940, the Soviet Army adopted the NR-40.

=== "Black knife" division ===
NR-40 was mostly produced at the ZiK (Russian: ЗиК) factory in Zlatoust, Urals.

Once the Ural Volunteer Tank Corps was formed in 1943, all its soldiers and officers were supplied with a special issue of NR-40 (also known as "black knife").

The formation was later named by Germans as "Black Knife Tank Division" (German: Schwarzmesser Panzer-Division). The unofficial divisional anthem mentioned the nickname as well (Russian: Дивизия черных ножей, lit. 'Black Knife Division').

== Design ==
The NR-40 has a 152 mm (6.0 in) blade with a clip point, a large ricasso, a black wooden handle, and an S-shaped guard.

The guard is "inverted" (unlike most S-shaped guards, it curves towards the edge) because standard Soviet Army grips called for holding the knife with the edge upwards.

=== Modern variants ===
NR-40 is no longer used by the army, but modern remakes and almost exact replicas of NR-40 are produced in Zlatoust to this day. A knife of exactly the same proportions would be legally a weapon, thus prohibiting free sale. To circumvent that, producers either use a thinner blade or remove the guard.

== Variants ==
=== NR-43 ===
A NR-43 combat knife on display

Improved variant in use during the Cold War.

=== wz. 55 ===
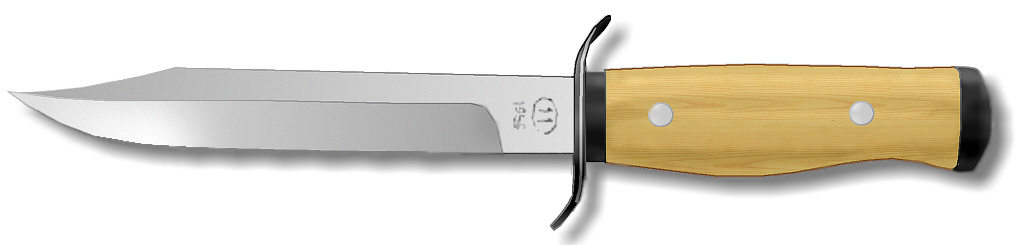
wz. 55

The wz. 55 (Polish: Nóż wojskowy wz. 55, lit. 'Type 55 combat knife') was the Polish verision of the NR-40.

=== M1951 ===
The M1951 (Serbian: Bodež M1951/J, lit. 'M1951/J knife'; Croatian: Nož M1951, lit. 'M1951 knife') was a Yugoslavian design based on the NR-40.

== Users ==
=== Former ===
- PRC
  - People's Liberation Army Special Operations Forces
- Soviet Union

== See also ==
- Puukko
- KA-BAR
- Fairbairn–Sykes fighting knife
- Kampfmesser 42
- Ballistic knife
- NRS-2
