= OTs-38 Stechkin silent revolver =

OTs-38 Stechkin
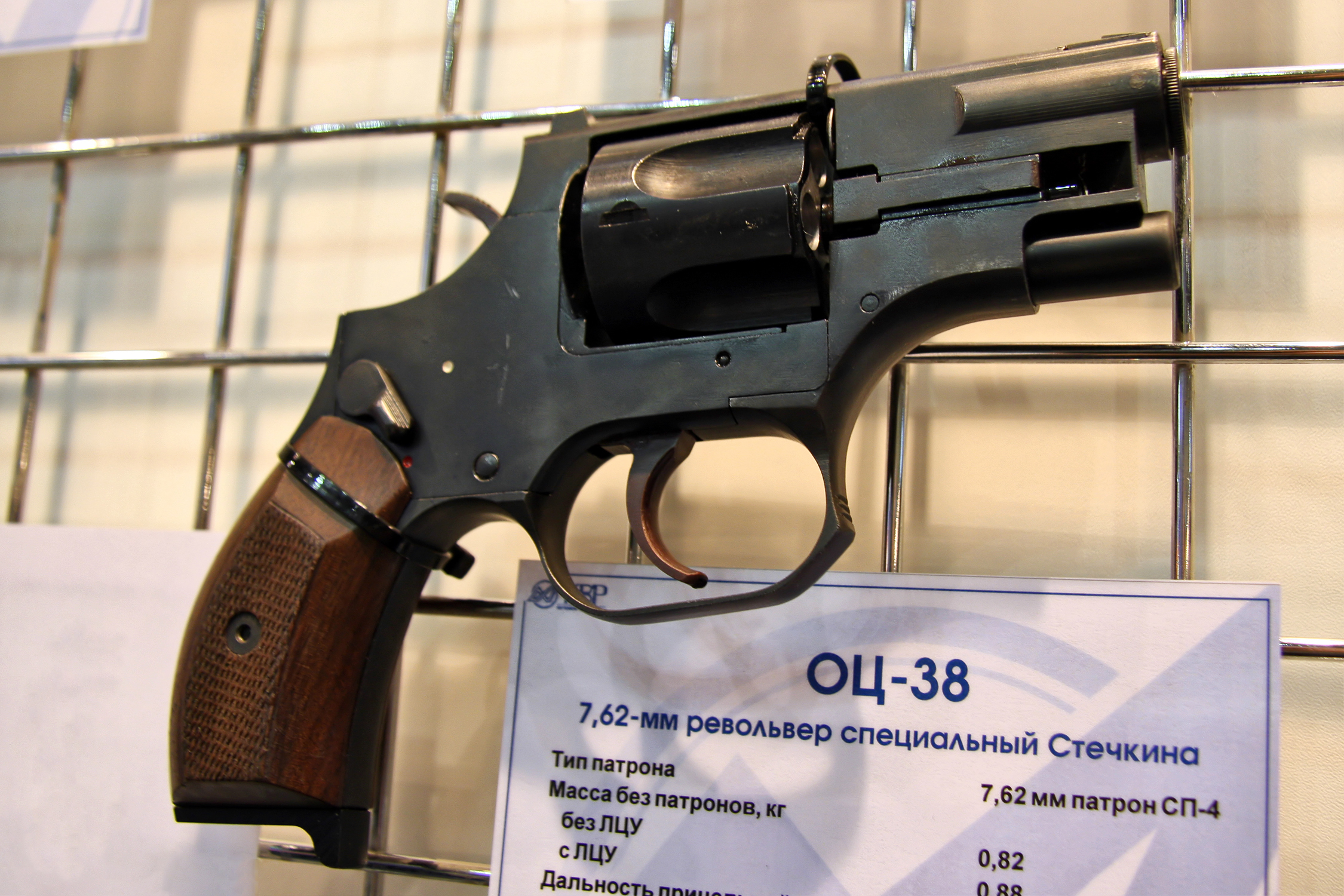
- OTs-38 in Interpolitex-2011
- Type: Revolver
- Place of origin: Russia

Service history
- In service: 2002 — Present
- Used by: Russia; Syria

Production history
- Designer: Igor Yakovlevich Stechkin
- Designed: 2001
- Manufacturer: KBP Instrument Design Bureau
- Unit cost: $567.80
- Produced: 2002

Specifications
- Mass: 820g (1 lb 13 oz) (without laser and empty), 880g (1 lb 15 oz) (with laser and empty)
- Length: 191mm (7.5 in)
- Width: 40mm (1.6 in)
- Height: 140mm (5.5 in)
- Cartridge: 7.62×41 mm SP-4
- Action: Double-action Revolver
- Effective firing range: 50m
- Feed system: 5 round cylinder, loaded by full moon clips
- Sights: Fixed front and rear, optional integral laser sight

The OTs-38 Stechkin is a 5-shot, double-action revolver, in production and service since 2002, chambered in the silent action 7.62×41mm SP-4 cartridge.

== Design ==
The effective range of fire for the OTs-38 Stechkin is 50 m. The cartridge employs a captive piston, creating a gas seal, so there is no flash or loud report upon discharge.

As the cartridge is rimless, the cylinder is fed via full moon clips. The SP-4 cartridges emit no report or flame because the propellant gases are retained in the case. The OTs-38 revolver is claimed to be effectively silent, as the sound level of the live and dry firing is practically identical.

=== S&W QSPR ===
This system is virtually identical to that employed by the Quiet Special Purpose Revolver (QSPR) a variant of the commercially available Smith & Wesson Model 29 .44 Magnum revolvers, rebuilt to fire specially manufactured dedicated integrally silenced ammunition.

Early prototypes had very short smooth-bore barrels with 0.40 inch (10 mm) bore and matching chambers, but later versions have longer barrels of up to four inches (100 mm). QSPR ammunition (which pioneered the captive piston propellant gas containment system) ejected fifteen tungsten balls from the special cartridges, weighing 7.5 grain (0.5 grams) each, exiting at a muzzle velocity of around 730 fps (222m/s) for a muzzle energy of roughly 135 ft-lbs (185J).

This load was tailored to wound at up to 100 ft (30 m), and have a practical, and potentially fatal, effect at ranges below 30 ft (10 m), deemed sufficient for the QSPR's intended and narrow application: clearing the confined and dimly lit to pitch-black tunnels encountered by "tunnel rats" during the Vietnam War. No sights were fitted.

The acoustic signature of QSPR rounds was around 110 dB (similar to a traditionally silenced .22LR pistol), the captive piston eliminated muzzle flash (vital when most engagements occurred in near or total darkness). While effective, only 250 QSPRs were manufactured; production was discontinued after the US withdrawal from Vietnam.

=== OTs-38 ===
In contrast to its virtually stock predecessor, the later OTs-38 is innovative to a degree unusual even in special purpose weapons:

- The cylinder pivots out to the right-hand side.
- A manual safety catch that allows the pre-cocked hammer to be set on manual safety, enabling the revolver to be carried cocked. (The mechanism also prevents accidental discharge with the cylinder open or not fully closed, with the revolver dropped or struck.)
- The barrel is mounted below the axis pin (the gun fires from the lowest cylinder chamber), so recoil is directed straight into the shooter's hand, rather than exerting a torque that raises the muzzle. This improves both accuracy and the maximum rate of fire.

The OTs-38 is fitted with an integral laser sight located above the cylinder axis (where a conventional revolver has its barrel) powered by three D-0.03D batteries.

== Users ==
- Russian Federation
- Syria - Syrian special units and police

== See also ==
- Captive bolt pistol
- List of Russian weaponry
- PSS silent pistol
- Stechkin automatic pistol
- AAI QSPR
