= Molot Bekas-M =

Bekas-M
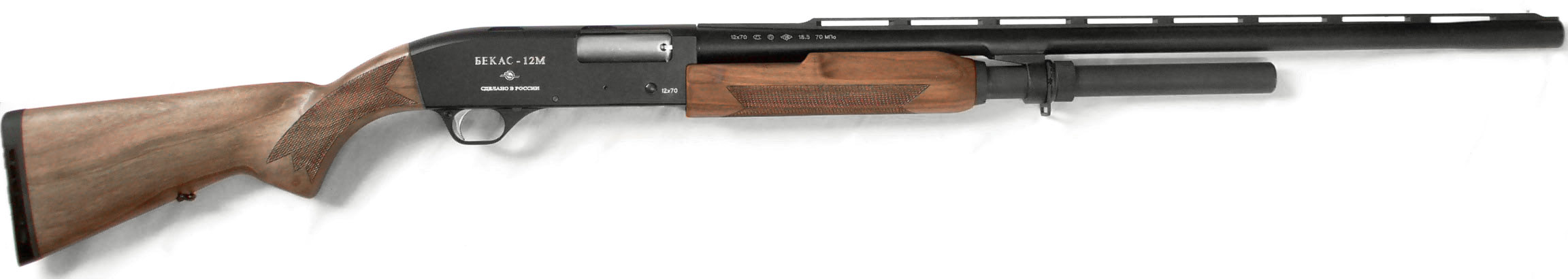
- Bekas-12M with 26" barrel
- Type: pump-action shotgun
- Place of origin: Russia

Production history
- Designer: Petr Mokrushin
- Designed: 1996–1997
- Manufacturer: Molot, Vyatskiye Polyany
- Unit cost: US$300–400
- Produced: 1999–2012
- Variants: See Versions, below

Specifications
- Mass: 3.0 kg (6.6 lb) to 3.3 kg (7.3 lb)
- Length: 844 mm (33.2 in) to 1,301 mm (51.2 in)
- Barrel length: 535 to 750 mm (19 to 27.5 in)
- Cartridge: 12 gauge or 16 gauge
- Action: pump-action
- Feed system: 6-round internal tube magazine
- Sights: Bead or open sights (all iron sights), receiver mount for scopes

The Molot Bekas-M (Russian: "snipe") is a series of Russian pump-action shotguns manufactured by the Molot machine plant in Vyatskie Polyany, Kirov Oblast. The Bekas-M series comprises a wide variety of models, all of which share the same basic receiver and action, but differ in barrel length and choke options. Some models are sold in combination sets (with a single receiver and two barrels), some are supplied with a plastic pistol grip, and most models have a walnut stock and forearm. Its classical design and consistent quality, together with the availability of low-priced sets with two barrels, helped it to gain popularity among hunters and home-defense enthusiasts in Russia.

== Development ==
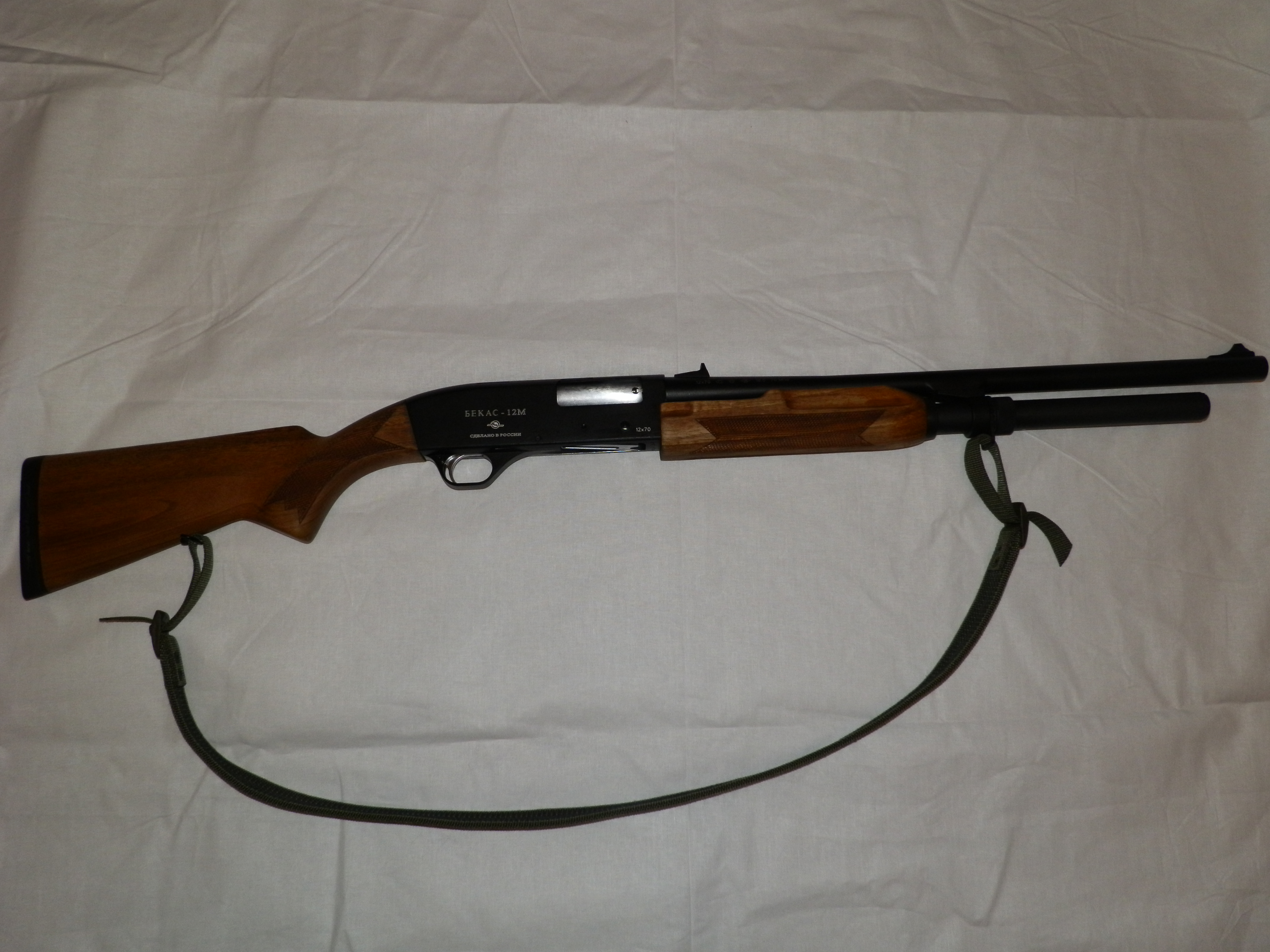
Molot Bekas-M

The first shotgun aimed at the civilian market, the Bekas-M (based on KS-23 design) went into production in 1997 at the Molot machine plant in Vyatskiye Polyany. It gained popularity among hunters, but was produced only in 16 gauge (which became less common in Russia during the 1990s). Molot began development on a pair of shotguns (semi-automatic and pump-action) with a unified design, chambered in the more-popular 12 gauge. Bekas-Auto and Bekas-M went into production in 1999. The Bekas-M was produced in both 12 and 16 gauge and had some changes in its design from the original Bekas; most notably, the safety lever was replaced by a cross-bolt safety and the barrel lug was moved from the end of the tube to its center.

== Design ==
The detachable barrel is locked in place with a dowel at the receiver and a nut at the magazine tube. The barrel and chamber are chrome-coated for increased durability and corrosion protection. The chamber is sealed by rotating the sealing wedge, which locks into the port in the shank of the barrel. Its trigger mechanism is located on a detachable mounting plate. Cartridges are fed from a tubular magazine under the barrel, and shells are ejected from the side of the receiver. The forearm is located on the magazine, and is connected to the slide frame by two action bars. A blocking lever blocks the forearm when the hammer is cocked. A cross-bolt trigger safety prevents an accidental pull of the trigger from firing the gun.

== Affordability ==
The popularity of the Bekas-M in Russia was partly due to its low price and the availability of combination two-barrel sets which could be bought directly from the manufacturer for the equivalent of US$300. In 2008, the manufacturer stopped selling guns to the public after signing an exclusive contract with the Deryabin-Arms arms dealer. This led to combination sets being sold at gun shops for as much as US$1100. In 2010 the contract expired; while Deryabin-Arms is going through bankruptcy, the factory resumed sales to the public directly and through retailers.

== Versions ==
=== 2.75-inch chamber ===
"Bekas-M" variants

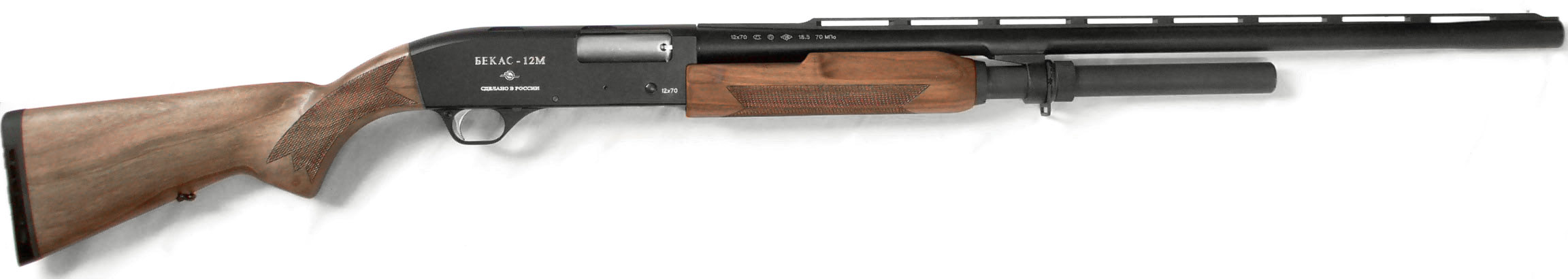
Bekas-12M with 720 mm barrel

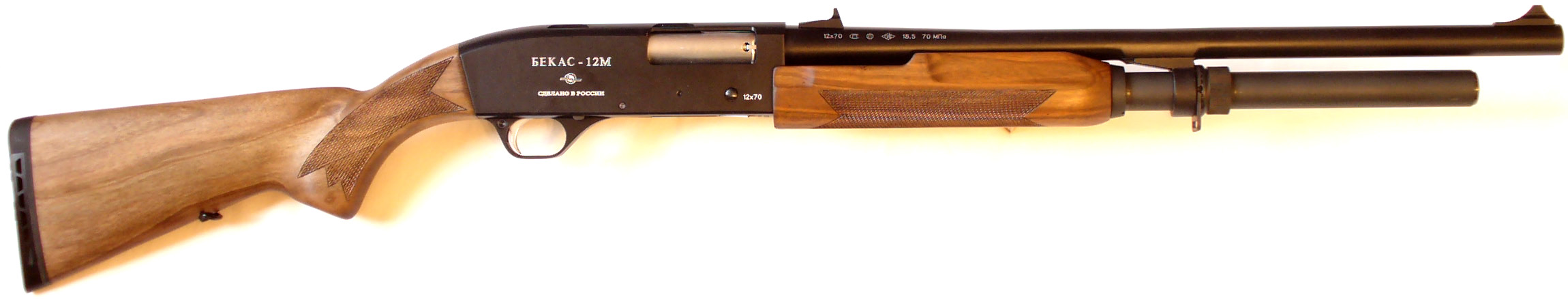
Bekas-12M with 535 mm barrel and walnut stock

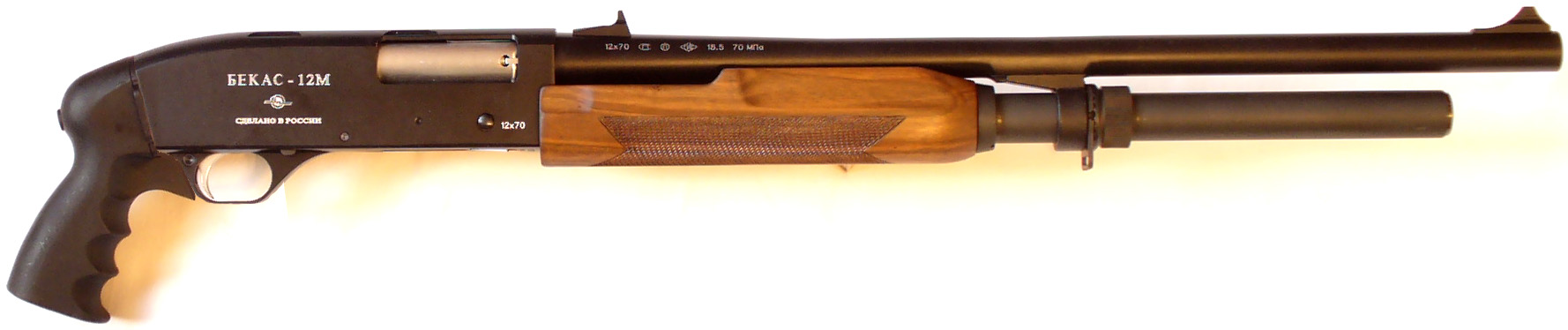
Bekas-12M with 535 mm barrel and pistol grip

There are two main Bekas-M models: the Bekas-12M and the Bekas-16M (the number denoting the gauge), both chambered for 2.75-inch (70 mm) shells. They come in four barrel lengths: a 535 mm cylinder-bore barrel with open sights and 680 mm, 720 mm and 750 mm barrels with three screw-in chokes (0.0 mm, 0.5 mm and 1.0 mm) and have a ventilated rib with bead sight. All shotguns have a black finish, and are equipped with a walnut stock or a plastic pistol grip; the forearm is always walnut. The first production runs had a revolver-style pistol grip with walnut cheeks, which was replaced by a more-ergonomic black plastic pistol grip. There are nine variations in each gauge, differing as follows:

Version	Two-barrel set	Barrel length(s)	Stock	Pistol grip
00		680 mm	+	
01		535 mm	+	
02		720 mm	+	
03		750 mm	+	
04		535 mm		+
05	+	680 mm, 535 mm	+	+
06	+	720 mm, 535 mm	+	+
07	+	750 mm, 535 mm	+	+
08	+	750 mm, 680 mm	+	+

Packing versions are known as "RP-12M" or "RP-16M", followed by the version; for example, a 12-gauge Bekas-M with a set of 535 mm and 720 mm barrels, stock and pistol grip is called an RP-12M-06.

=== 3-inch chamber ===
There was also a small pilot lot of 12-gauge Bekas-M shotguns chambered for 3-inch (76 mm) shells, known as the VPO-202. In 2010, it appeared in the manufacturer's product catalogue.

=== Service version ===
A "civilian" Bekas-M with a 535 mm barrel can be converted at the factory to the Bekas-M-S "service" version for private security agencies; this version has a bolt modified to leave a mark on the shell.

== Accessories ==
The range of accessories for the Bekas-M is limited. The manufacturer offers neither a plastic forearm and stock nor magazine extenders, but cylinder-bore and paradox 15 cm barrel extenders are available. The owner's manual also states that the shotgun can be supplied with an unnamed telescopic sight, bag and belt upon request. An adapter for mounting a Weaver rail on top of the receiver was available, but is discontinued; however, there is an aftermarket adapter made in Tula by EST.

== Users ==
- Belarus - Bekas-12M is allowed as civilian hunting weapon
- Russian Federation
