= PSS silent pistol =

Soviet integrally suppressed firearm

PSS
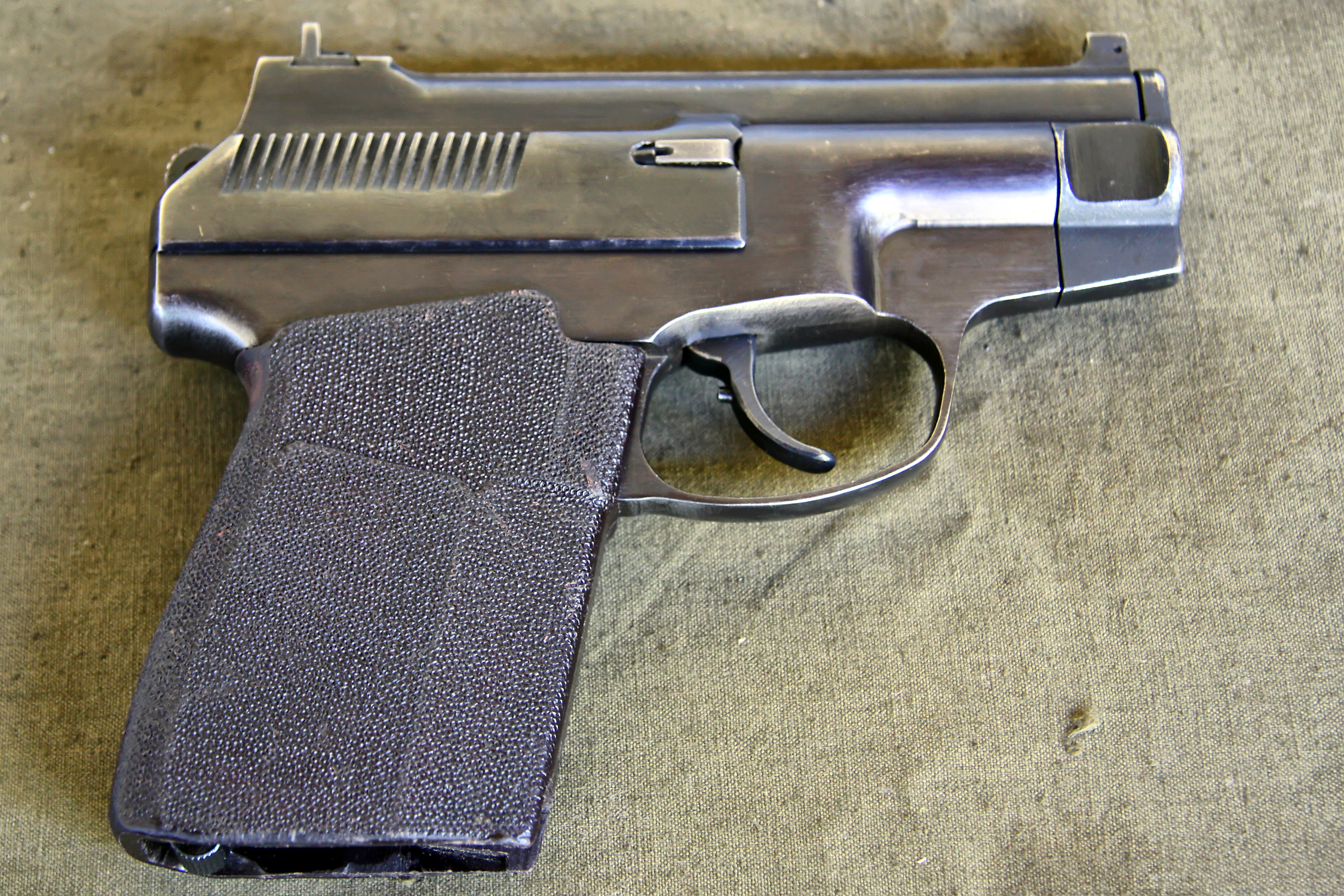
- Type: Pistol
- Place of origin: Soviet Union

Service history
- In service: 1983–present

Production history
- Designer: TsNIITochMash
- Designed: 1979–1983
- Manufacturer: Tula Arms Plant
- Variants: PSS-2

Specifications
- Mass: 700 g (1 lb 9 oz), 850 g with cartridge
- Length: 165 mm (6.50 in)
- Barrel length: 35 mm
- Cartridge: 7.62×41 mm SP-4
- Caliber: 7.62 mm
- Action: Recoil-operated
- Muzzle velocity: 200 m/s (660 ft/s)
- Effective firing range: 25 m
- Maximum firing range: 50 m
- Feed system: 6-round detachable box
- Sights: Fixed blade sights

The PSS silent pistol or MSS "Vul" ("Вул") is a Soviet silent pistol operating on a sealed cartridge system. Its GRAU designation is 6P28 while "Vul" comes from the codename for its development program.

== History ==
Developed around 1980 for assassinations and reconnaissance, the PSS was first issued to KGB Spetsnaz in 1983.

== Cartridge ==
How the PSS action works

The PSS uses a specially developed 7.62×41mm necked round SP-4 (СП-4), also used by the OTs-38 Stechkin silent revolver.

The cartridge contains a propelling charge which drives an internal piston in contact with the base of the bullet.

On firing, the piston propels the bullet out of the barrel with enough energy to achieve an effective range of 25 meters.

At the end of its travel, the piston seals the cartridge neck, preventing noise, smoke, or blast from escaping.

== Action ==
The PSS is recoil-operated. It has a slide designed to operate silently, in keeping with the pistol's design for silent operation.

In other respects, the PSS generally follows traditional conventions, except for the slide's guide rod, which is located above the barrel and instead of guide rails on the pistol frame.

The weapon uses a special cartridge with an internal piston. It has been measured to produce a sound level of 122 dB.

== Production and use ==
It is under production in the special weapons foundry at TsNIITochMash. PSS pistols are still in use by some FSB and MVD units.

The PSS has been used in the Syrian civil war. It has seen use by both sides in the 2022 Russian invasion of Ukraine. Within Russia the gun has also been issued to OMON and SOBR.

The PSS-2 was adopted by the Russian FSB security agency in 2011.

Users

- Georgia
- Russia
- Syria
- Ukraine

== Variants ==
The PSS-2 silenced pistol was developed in Russia. It is based on the original PSS but with some features of the SR-1M pistol and some improvements. It fires the noiseless 7.62×43mm SP-16 ammunition which is more powerful than, but incompatible with, the original 7.62×41mm cartridge.

== See also ==
- List of Russian weaponry
- MSP Groza silent pistol
- NRS-2 – Soviet survival knife/pistol hybrid
- S4M
