= NRS-2 =

Soviet survival knife/pistol hybrid

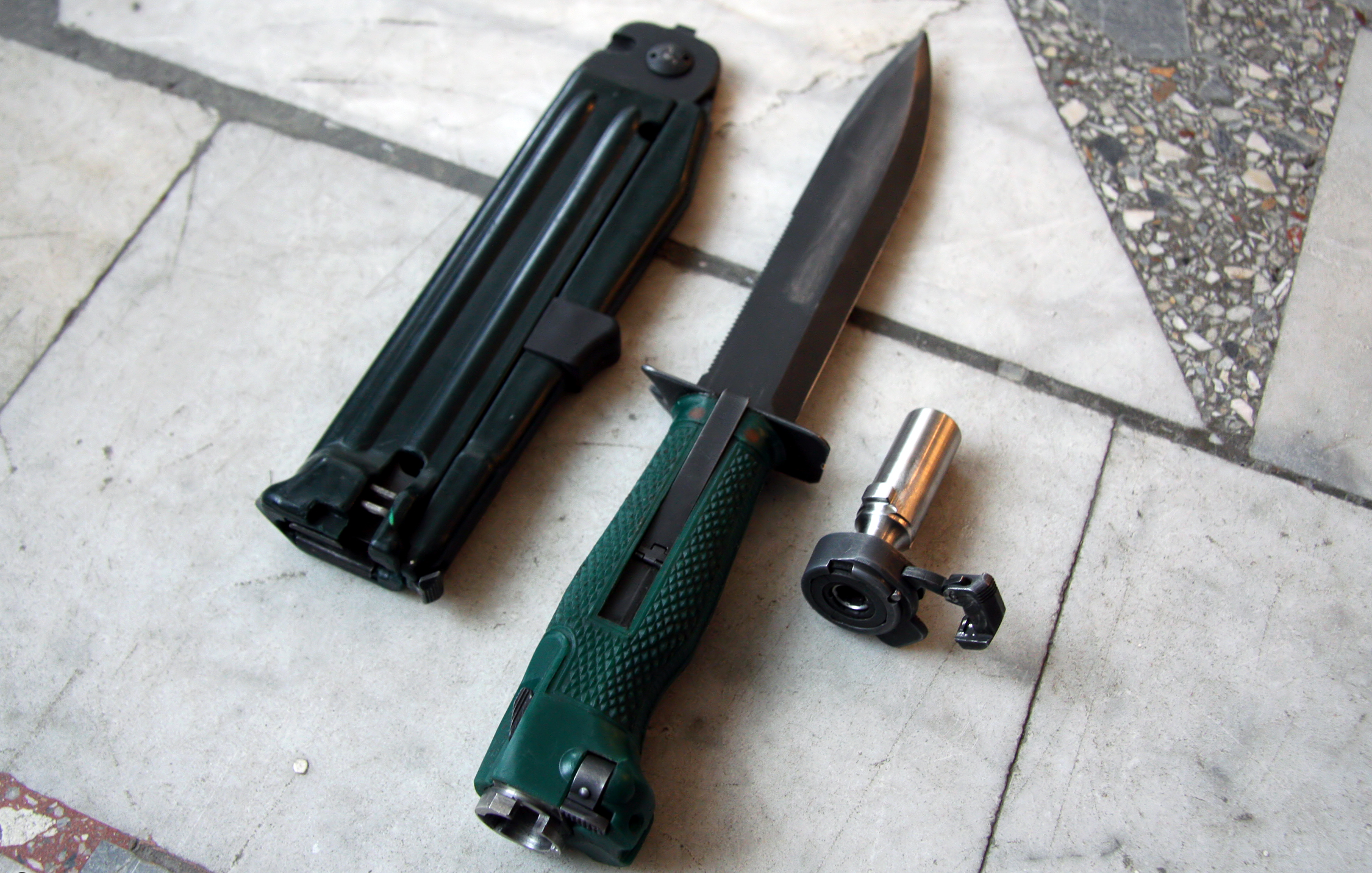
- Type: Survival knife
- Place of origin: Soviet Union

Service history
- In service: 1986–present

Production history
- Designer: TsNIITochMash
- Manufacturer: Tula Arms Plant
- Variants: NR-2

Specifications
- Mass: 570 g
- Length: 290 mm
- Barrel length: 60 mm
- Cartridge: 7.62×42 mm SP-4
- Action: Single shot
- Muzzle velocity: 140 m/s
- Effective firing range: 25 m
- Feed system: single-round
- Sights: Open sight

The NRS-2 (Russian: Нож Разведчика Стреляющий, romanized: Nozh Razvedchika Strelyayushchy, lit. 'Scout Firing Knife') (Note: Official GRAU index 6P31 (Russian: 6П31)) (Note: Also known as the Wave (Russian: Взмах, romanized: Vzmakh)) is a Soviet gun hybrid.

== History ==
The NRS-2 was manufactured by the Tula Arms Plant for Soviet Spetsnaz troops in the 1980s, and is still used as a personal weapon for Spetsnaz and special law enforcement groups.

== Design ==
The NRS-2 combines a knife blade with a built-in single-shot shooting mechanism designed to fire 7.62×41mm SP-4 (Russian: СП-4) cartridges, originally designed for the PSS silent pistol.

The NRS-2 is designed to either be thrown at target, to pierce and cut, or be fired at distances of up to 25 metres.

=== Shooting mechanism ===
To load the shooting mechanism, the opening lever is pressed, and the barrel rotated out of the knife handle.

Then the cartridge is inserted into the firing chamber and the barrel is reinserted back into the handle and rotated into place using two prongs that fit into the outer latch. The flip-up lever on the right side of the NRS-2 is then pulled to cock the internal hammer.

Before firing, the safety catch, located beside the barrel, must be turned to the "fire" position.

The user's left hand is then used to hold the underside of the grip, the right hand held against the right side with the right index finger placed on the single action push-button trigger, which is located above the safety catch beside the gun barrel.

== Variants ==
=== NR-2 survival knife ===
The NR-2 (Russian: НР-2; official GRAU index 6P32; Russian: 6П32) has its shooting mechanism replaced by survival equipment.

== Users ==
- Russia
- Ukraine

=== Former ===
- Soviet Union

== See also ==
- List of Russian weaponry
- NR-40
- PSS silent pistol
- TKB-506
- QSB-11
