= Girls' Frontline 2: Exilium =

2023 turn-based tactical video game

- English version logo
- Developer: MICA Team
- Publishers: CN/NA/ANZ/IE: Darkwinter; EU/UK/JP/KR/TW: HaoPlay; VN: THS Game
- Producer: Yuzhong
- Composer: Vanguard Sound
- Series: Girls' Frontline
- Engine: Unity
- Platforms: Microsoft Windows, iOS, Android, HarmonyOS NEXT
- Release: CN: 21 December 2023; NA/ANZ/IE: 3 December 2024; EU/UK/JP/KR/TW: 5 December 2024; VN: Q3 2026
- Genre: Turn-based tactics
- Mode: Single-player

Girls' Frontline 2: Exilium

Chinese name
- Traditional Chinese: 少女前線2：追放
- Simplified Chinese: 少女前线2：追放
- Literal meaning: Girls' Frontline 2: "Hunting after the released" or "Exile" (Note: Within the Chinese title, "追放" (zhuīfàng) is a double entendre. In Japanese, 追放 (tsuihō) means "exile", and refers to the Commander's exile to the contaminated zone following their departure from Griffin & Kryuger. In Chinese, 追放 means "chasing after what was released", and refers to the Commander's eventual reuniting with their former subordinate T-dolls following each individual encounter with them.)
Transcriptions
Standard Mandarin
- Hanyu Pinyin: Shàonǚ Qiánxiàn èr: Zhuīfàng
- Bopomofo: ㄕㄠˋ ㄋㄩˇ ㄑㄧㄢˊ ㄒㄧㄢˋ ㄦˋ ㄓㄨㄟ ㄈㄤˋ
- Wade–Giles: Shao^{4}-nü^{3} Ch'ien^{2}-hsien^{4} êrh^{4}: chui^{1}-fang^{4}
other Mandarin
- Sichuanese Pinyin: sao^{4} nyü^{3} qian^{2} xian^{4} er^{4}: zui^{1} fang^{4}
Wu
- Romanization: sau^{去} nyu^{去} zhi^{去} shi^{去} nyi^{去}: tsoe^{平} faon^{去}
Gan
- Romanization: seu^{3} nyy^{3} qien^{2} xien^{4} eo^{5}: zui^{1} fong^{4}
Xiang
- IPA: sau^{4} nyy^{3} zienn^{2} sienn^{4} e^{5}: jyei^{1} fan^{4}
Hakka
- Romanization: seu-ńg chhièn-sien ngi: chûi-fong
Yue: Cantonese
- Jyutping: siu^{3} neoi^{5} cin^{4} sin^{3} ji^{6}: zeoi^{1} fong^{3}
other Yue
- Taishanese: siau^{2} nui^{2} ten^{3} lhen^{1} ngei^{5}: zui^{1} fong^{1}
Southern Min
- Hokkien POJ: siàu-lú chiân-sòaⁿ jī: tui-hòng
- Teochew Peng'im: siao^{3} neng^{2} zoin^{5} suan^{3} ri^{6}: dui^{1} huang^{3}
Eastern Min
- Fuzhou BUC: siéu-nṳ̄ cièng-siáng nê: duĭ-huóng
Pu-Xian Min
- Hinghwa BUC: sa̤̍u-dṳ̂ céng-se̤̍ng dī: tui-ho̤̍ng
Northern Min
- Jian'ou Romanized: siǎu-nṳ̌ chîng-sui̿ng nī: dṳ́-huo̤̿ng

Korean name
- Hangul: 소녀전선2: 망명
- Hanja: 少女前線2: 亡命
- Literal meaning: Girls' Frontline 2: Exile
Transcriptions
- Revised Romanization: Sonyeo Jeonseon i: Mangmyeong
- McCune–Reischauer: Sonyŏ Chŏnsŏn i: Mangmyŏng

Japanese name
- Katakana: ドールズフロントライン2：エクシリウム
Transcriptions
- Romanization: Dōruzu Furontorain Tsū: Ekushiriumu
- Nihon-shiki: Dôruzu Hurontorain Tû: Ekusiriumu

Girls' Frontline 2: Exilium (Note: simplified Chinese: 少女前线2：追放; traditional Chinese: 少女前線2：追放; pinyin: Shàonǚ Qiánxiàn 2: Zhuīfàng) is a turn-based tactical strategy game developed by MICA Team, in which players command squads of android characters, known in-universe as T-Dolls, armed with firearms and melee blades. It is the sequel to Girls' Frontline, set ten years after its closing events.

The game was released in Mainland China on 21 December 2023, and later released worldwide on 3 December 2024 (by Darkwinter Software) or 5 December 2024 (by HaoPlay) depending on region.

== Gameplay ==
In-game combat interface screenshot of the main game mode, with the character Suomi selected

Screenshot of the alternate "Boundary Push" game mode, playing as the character Sharkry

Crew deck mode screenshot, with the player character depicted in the centre

The gameplay of Girls' Frontline 2 revolves around turn-based tactical battles which take place on grid levels, similar to games such as XCOM, Disgaea, and Shadowrun. The player commands a squad of units in order to fulfil mission objectives on a tactical map, which include destroying enemy units, capturing strategic points, surviving waves of enemy attacks, or evacuating all units to an extraction point. These playable units, which are combat androids called T-Dolls, are obtained by the player via a gacha system in standard and seasonal event banners using in-game currencies.

=== Character classes ===
T-Dolls are categorised into four different classes, namely:

- Sentinel: Primary damage dealing units with high DPS
- Bulwark: Tanking units with high survivability and defensive abilities
- Support: Units with healing and buffing abilities
- Vanguard: Units with high mobility that act in a sub-DPS capacity

=== Battle mechanics ===
In addition to a standard attack and a passive skill, T-Dolls have active skills that often consume "confectance index", a resource akin to ability points in standard role-playing games. These skills provide unique offensive or defensive capabilities depending on the T-Doll and have cooldown periods. Each T-Doll boasts an ultimate skill in their kit, which typically costs confectance as well. Confectance index replenishes over time or can be restored using certain active skills.

All units, both player-controlled and enemy-controlled, have a "stability index" which gradually decreases as they receive attacks from other units; when this is reduced to zero, "stability break" occurs, which reduces the effect of battlefield cover. The combat map offers locations with varying cover which reduces the amount of damage a unit receives, and the player is able to mitigate the effect of enemy cover with positional flanking, area-of-effect attacks, melee attacks, and elevated tiles which negate the efficacy of cover, or by reducing the enemy unit's stability index to zero.

Other forms of environmental effectors on the map include hazard tiles which apply damage or negative status effects to units, and interactable levers that alter elevators, conveyor belts or turrets on the battlefield. Beginning from the Chiral Redundancy major update onwards, a mechanism was introduced where tile effects generated by special unit skills that belong to different elemental types can be stacked together, for instance using an active attack to apply fire status to an existing ice tile, allowing the player to create additional status effects that apply to units occupying the tiles.

=== Min-max optimization ===
The combat ability of T-Dolls can be enhanced by increasing their training level, altering their weapon and attachment loadouts, fortifying the T-Doll using duplicates obtained via the gacha system, unlocking enhancement nodes on each T-Doll's "neural helix", and equipping "keys" which provide modifiers to abilities or stats. Standard rarity T-Dolls can also be upgraded to "elite" rarity after collecting the required upgrade materials, providing additional attribute boosts and granting new combat skills.

=== Other elements ===
A secondary game mode, known as "Boundary Push", involves the player controlling T-Dolls in real-time as they traverse through a large dungeon stage to collect loot pickups and locate the stage boss, making use of stealth mechanics and environmental hazards to reach the objective. A major update scheduled for 2026 will implement real-time top-down shooting combat to Boundary Push. Meanwhile, the "Artifact Recovery" game mode combines the gameplay with roguelike mechanics, where the player collects randomised T-Dolls and buff modifiers to use during each unique run towards a final boss.

While not in battle, the player can visit the T-Dolls in their dormitory to observe them during their everyday activities and present them with gifts to increase their affinity level, which provides minor stat increases during combat. Following the Deep Oblivion major update, an explorable home base of operations known as the "Crew Deck" was implemented, where the player can interact with acquired T-Dolls, play a cooking minigame in the kitchen, apply decorations and furniture to the base, and listen to ASMR content in the bedroom.

Outside of the main game, the player is also able to read additional in-universe lore using the "Traceback" menu. Time-limited seasonal events have also included assorted minigames, including a rail shooter game mode parodying the aesthetic of Goddess of Victory: Nikke, a Monopoly parody board game, a survivors-like shoot 'em up, a café management simulation game, a Doodle Jump clone, a motorcycle racing game, an auto battler, and a parody of the "butt battle" mode from Dead or Alive Xtreme 3.

== Setting ==
The game is set ten years after the events of the final campaign chapter of Girls' Frontline. The T-Dolls, having previously been exclusively referred to by the names of the firearms they've been imprinted onto within their fire-control cores, begin choosing to adopt new, more human-like personal names as their callsigns, either for personal or professional reasons. As the private military company Griffin & Kryuger undergoes dissolution and reshuffling, many T-Dolls find themselves joining other organisations, or ending up settling down in civilian life. Meanwhile, as the URNC (Note: "Union of Rossartrist Nations Coalition" (Chinese: 联合政府罗克萨特主义合众国联盟), a supranational union which formed in 2064 in Europe, merged with the Neo-Soviet Union by 2071, and by the time of the events of Girls' Frontline 2 in 2074, later expanded into South America and northern Asia) grows in size and power, it begins to undertake a major project of purifying contamination zones afflicted by Collapse radiation so that human resettlement can occur.

== Narrative ==
The player takes on the role of "the Commander", who, at the end of the previous game, resigned from their position at Griffin & Kryuger following a catastrophic military operation in Frankfurt, and subsequently was forced by Rossartrist shadow members to sign a contract prohibiting them from coming into contact with their former subordinate T-Dolls from Griffin & Kryuger, and to exile themselves to the contaminated zone, as a condition for not being killed. There, the Commander assumes the role of a bounty hunter who takes on various tasks for commissions, travelling in a Mobile Base Vehicle known as the "Elmo" while accompanied by a team of three T-Dolls and a mechanic named Mayling.

During a cargo delivery job issued by BRIEF, (Note: "Bounty Hunter Rights Expansion Federation" (Chinese: 赏金猎人权益拓展及推进协会), a governing body for bounty hunters) the Commander's team is raided by Varjager bandits. They make a detour to a hostile area teeming with ELIDs, (Note: "Eurosky Low-Emission Infectious Disease" (Chinese: 广域性低辐射感染症), hostile creatures that have undergone mutations as a result of infection caused by Collapse radiation exposure) in an attempt to eliminate the remaining Varjagers in pursuit. There, they encounter Colphne, a civilian medical support Doll, who requests to join the team and have her body modified with a fire-control core. While inspecting the cargo to be delivered, the Commander's team discovered that the box contains a girl inside, Helena, who is a human experimentation subject seemingly immune to the adverse effects of Collapse radiation. The delivery client contacts the team, and asks to rendezvous at a set of coordinates. Meanwhile, in a call, former Griffin & Kryuger colleague Kalina instructs the Commander to meet with her at ODE-01, a satellite city in Odesa, and so the Commander's team splits up. As the T-Dolls reach the rendezvous point, the client ambushes them, only for the client to be apprehended following the firefight. However, the client is promptly rescued by a hostile T-Doll, Sextans, and the two escape. At the same time, Kalina reveals to the Commander that she is now working for NOMFA, (Note: "Non-Military Forces Administration" (Chinese: 非军事力量管理局), a URNC agency responsible for the regulation of non-state armed groups, including private military companies) and that she had issued the assignment so that the human sample could be safely secured.

One of Kalina's subordinate T-Dolls, Lenna, spots law enforcement en route to apprehend the Commander, forcing the Commander to make their escape. Odesa law enforcement agents, under the command of the client, raid Kalina's office and prepare to give her a summary execution, however are thwarted by Lenna who arrives at the last minute in an attack helicopter. After the Commander's escape from Odesa, Kalina requests that they continue making their way towards Kyiv, and that they should resupply with a black marketeer named Saga while on the way. The team encounters a Varjager encampment in Bihor and quickly subdues them, only to find the same band of Varjagers raiding Saga's encampment. The team discovers the Paradeus cult operating out of clusters of human settlements in the contaminated zone, and decide to capture a Paradeus leader figure known as Niter, and then attach a tracker to her before releasing her, with the aim of finding the nearby Paradeus congregation. Helena insists to come along as they infiltrate the congregation in hooded disguises, and during the procession, a cult member is seemingly cured of ELID symptoms, however the team soon have their cover blown as an attendee begins to indiscriminately attack followers at the procession while Helena progressively falls ill and her autonomous defence system opens fire into the crowd. Amidst the chaos, Sextans reveals herself and pursues the team, who escape the scene by aerial drone and return to the Elmo MBV.

While in pursuit of the Elmo MBV, Sextans reveals extensive damage across her body frame, and seemingly has no recollection of her past. Lenna contacts the Commander with a sitrep update, and calls upon Dandelion to assist the team, who then infiltrates the Elmo MBV's systems. After Sextans is subdued by the team, Lenna informs the Commander of Kalina's request to transfer Helena to NOMFA personnel situated in Lviv, culminating in the decision to split the Elmo MBV's team up so that Groza can keep watch over Sextans. Dandelion hijacks a Dinergate robot body in order to accompany the Commander, Helena and Colphne to Lviv, and while en route via aerial drone, Helena falls ill again, causing her autonomous defence system to damage the drone; the aircraft loses flight stability, and Helena is ejected. The drone makes an emergency landing, and the group is quickly surrounded by approaching PMC hostiles, however a large ELID suddenly charges towards the Commander's party, crashing into the building where they've garrisoned. The Commander's group make their way into the nearby underground tunnel for refuge, only to discover a Paradeus human experimentation facility.

== Characters ==
=== Campaign story playable T-Dolls ===
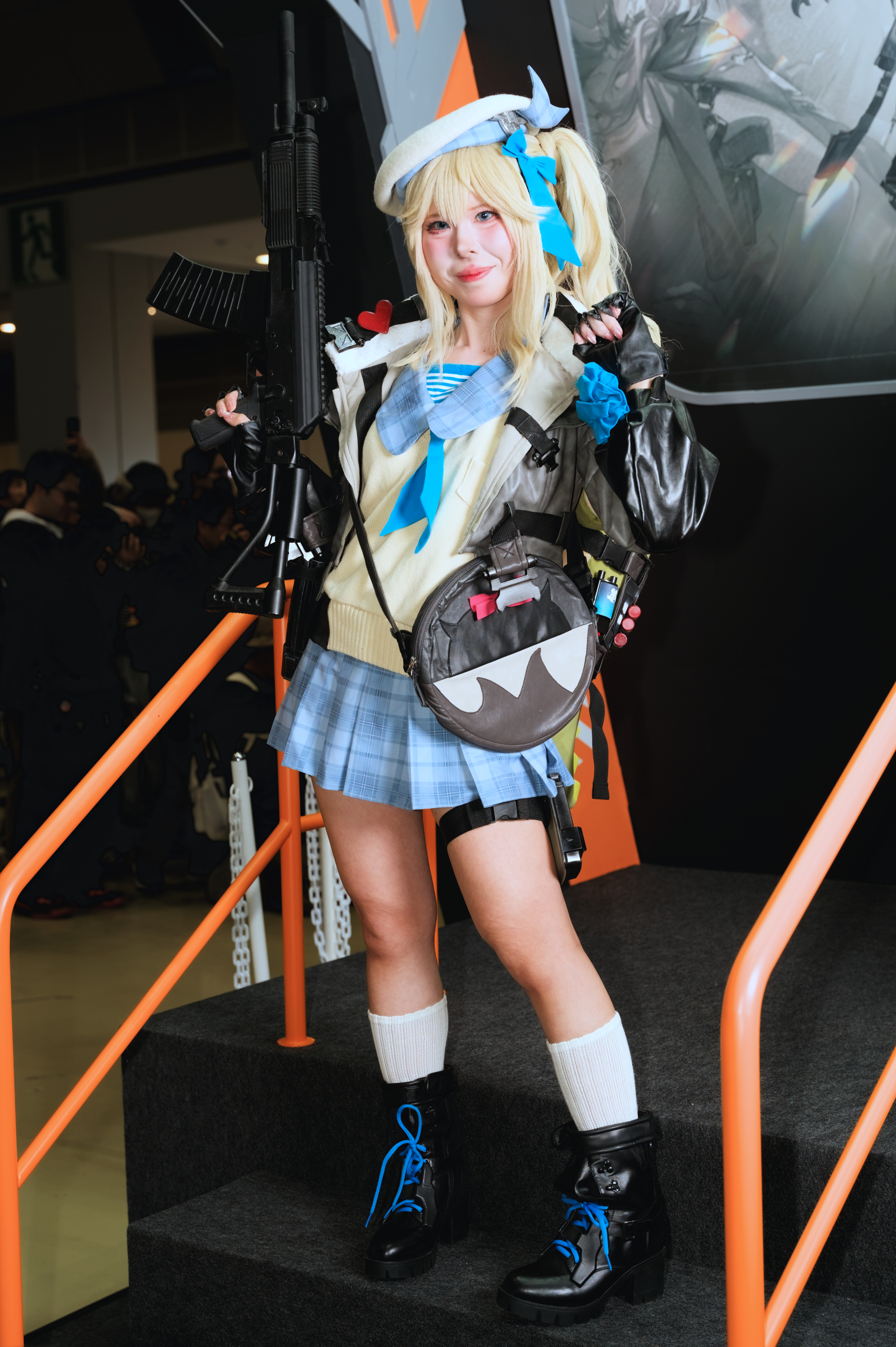
Cosplay of Vepley, at Comiket 107

Groza (闪电; Shǎndiàn;)
Voiced by: Zhang Jen (Chinese); Marina Inoue (Japanese); Lee Dae-un (Korean)
A T-Doll armed with an OTs-14 Groza assault rifle, originally affiliated with Griffin & Kryuger before being appropriated for state security matters following the PMC's dissolution, whom the Commander finds damaged under a pile of rubble prior to the events of the game. Groza is unable to recall any memories prior to being reactivated by the Commander.

Nemesis (纳美西丝; Nàměixīsī;)
Voiced by: Qin Ziyi (Chinese); Aya Endō (Japanese); Shin Na-ri (Korean)
A T-Doll armed with an OM 50 Nemesis rifle who plays the role of the team's sniper. She has a damaged language module, and as a result, can only speak in poetic riddles.

Krolik (克罗丽科; Kèluólìkē;)
Voiced by: MAO (Chinese); Sayaka Ohara (Japanese); Song Ha-rim (Korean)
A T-Doll with bunny ears armed with a melee blade. In addition to combat duties, she assumes the role of the team's de facto translator for Nemesis.

Colphne (寇尔芙; Kòuěrfú;)
Voiced by: Shi Haku (Chinese); Naomi Ōzora (Japanese); Sung Ye-won (Korean)
A former civilian medical T-Doll who joins the Commander's team after her entire medical regiment was wiped out by an ELID attack, escaping as the sole survivor. Armed with a Taurus Curve pistol.

Vepley (维普蕾; Wéipǔlěi;)
Voiced by: Cotton Candy (Chinese); Hitomi Harada (Japanese); Jung Hye-won (Korean)
A singing "idol" T-Doll handed over to the Commander by the black marketeer Saga. Armed with a Vepr-12 shotgun.

=== Supporting characters ===
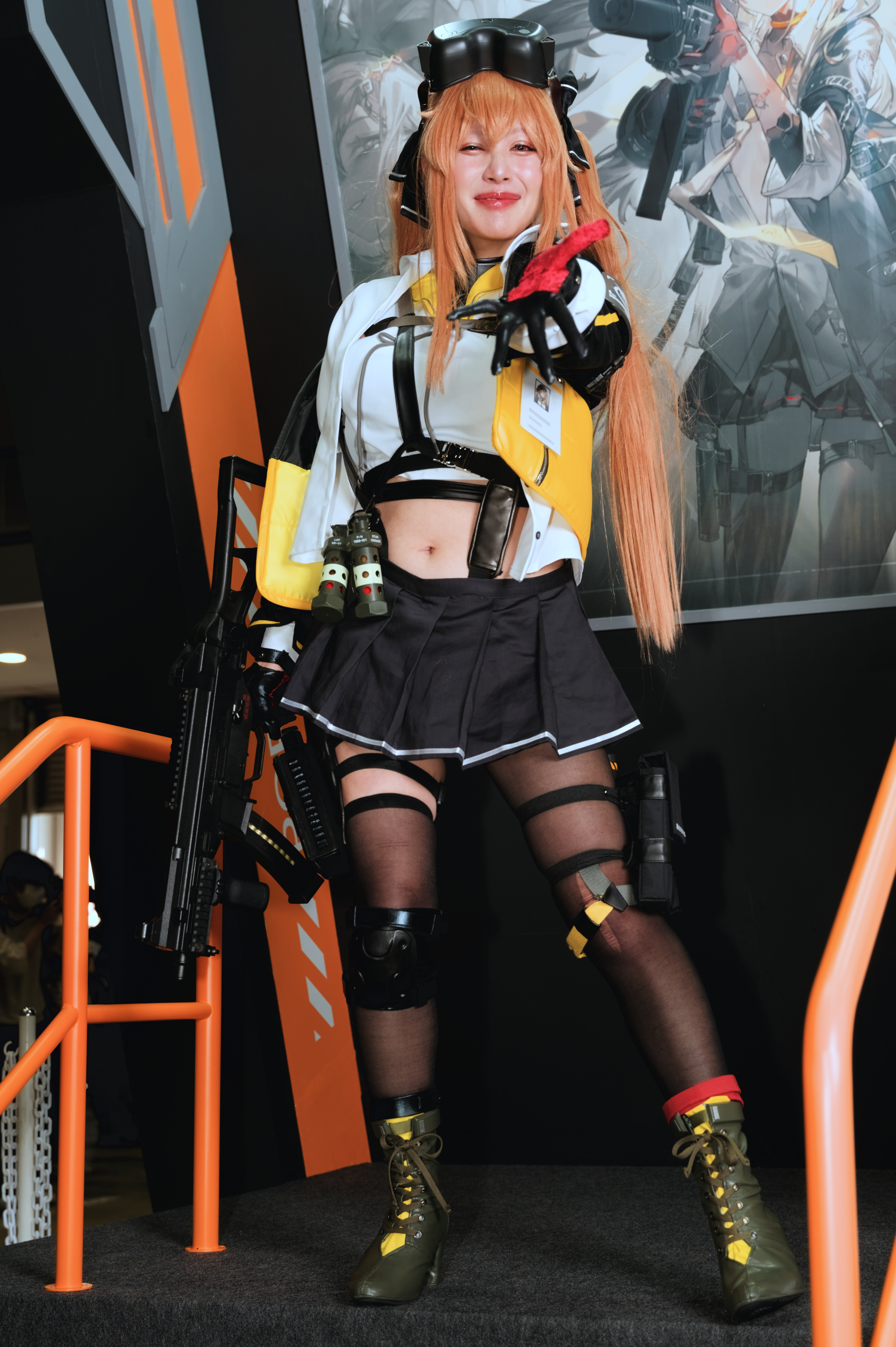
Cosplay of Lenna, at Comiket 107

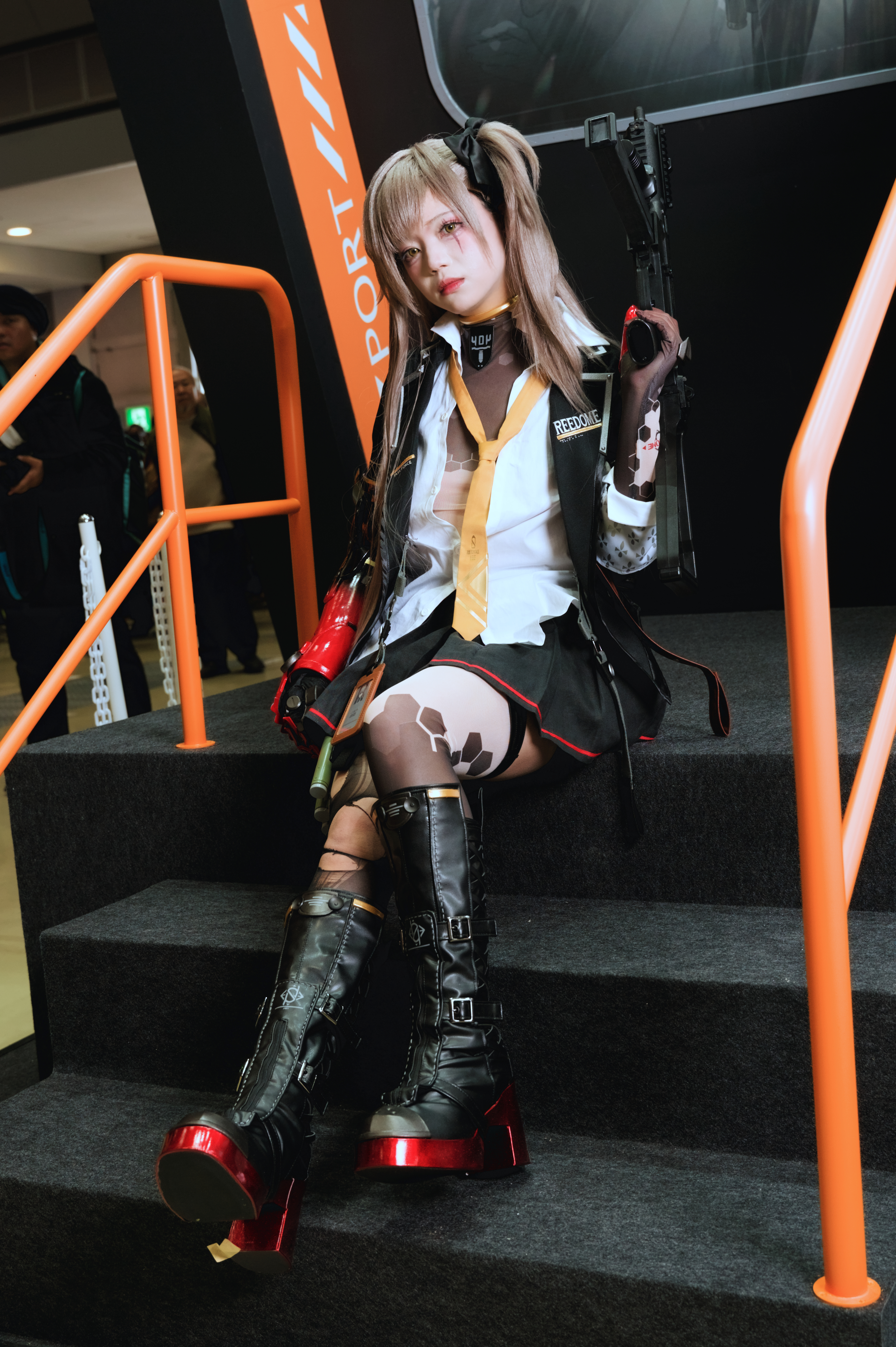
Cosplay of Leva, at Comiket 107

Mayling (美玲; Měilíng;)
Voiced by: Liu Wen (Chinese); Madoka Asahina (Japanese); Kim Ha-ru (Korean)
The mechanic of the Elmo Mobile Base Vehicle, used by the Commander as long-distance transport and a base of operations.

Kalina (格琳娜; Gélínnà;)
Voiced by: Tsumao (Chinese); Nao Tōyama (Japanese); Lee Ji-hyun (Korean)
The Commander's former colleague from Griffin & Kryuger PMC, who has since become a bureaucrat at NOMFA.

Lenna (莱娜; Láinà;)
Voiced by: Hou Xiaofei (Chinese); Mamiko Noto (Japanese); Lee Sae-ah (Korean)
Formerly known as UMP9 in Girls' Frontline and prior to changing her name, Lenna is a T-Doll formerly subordinate to the Commander at Griffin & Kryuger, and now reports to Kalina. She is also the protagonist of the Intertwined Assault event.

Leva (莱娅; Láiyà;)
Voiced by: Wang Yaxin (Chinese); Yū Sasahara (Japanese); Kim Ha-young (Korean)
Formerly known as UMP45 in Girls' Frontline, Leva is Lenna's sister, an is also an ex-Griffin T-Doll working for NOMFA under Kalina. She is also the primary protagonist of the Deep Oblivion event.

Dandelion (丹德莱; Dāndélái;)
An artificial OGAS consciousness born from the neural cloud of M4A1 and develops her own independent free will during the previous game, who infiltrates the Elmo MBV's systems and provides assistance to the Commander, specialising in electronic warfare and data processing.

Poludnitsa (佩妮泽; Pèinīzé;)
A famed underground broker in Eastern Europe.

Saga (萨珈; Sàjiā;)
An underground broker based near the Black Sea.

Sextans (六分仪; Liùfēnyí;)
Voiced by: Tang Yajing (Chinese); Yūko Sanpei (Japanese); Heo Ye-eun (Korean)
Third-generation T-Doll working for the Girard Group, who serves as the early-game antagonist. Later following her capture, she becomes the protagonist of the Moonshroud Requiem event, where she is armed with a rapier.

=== Seasonal event T-Dolls ===
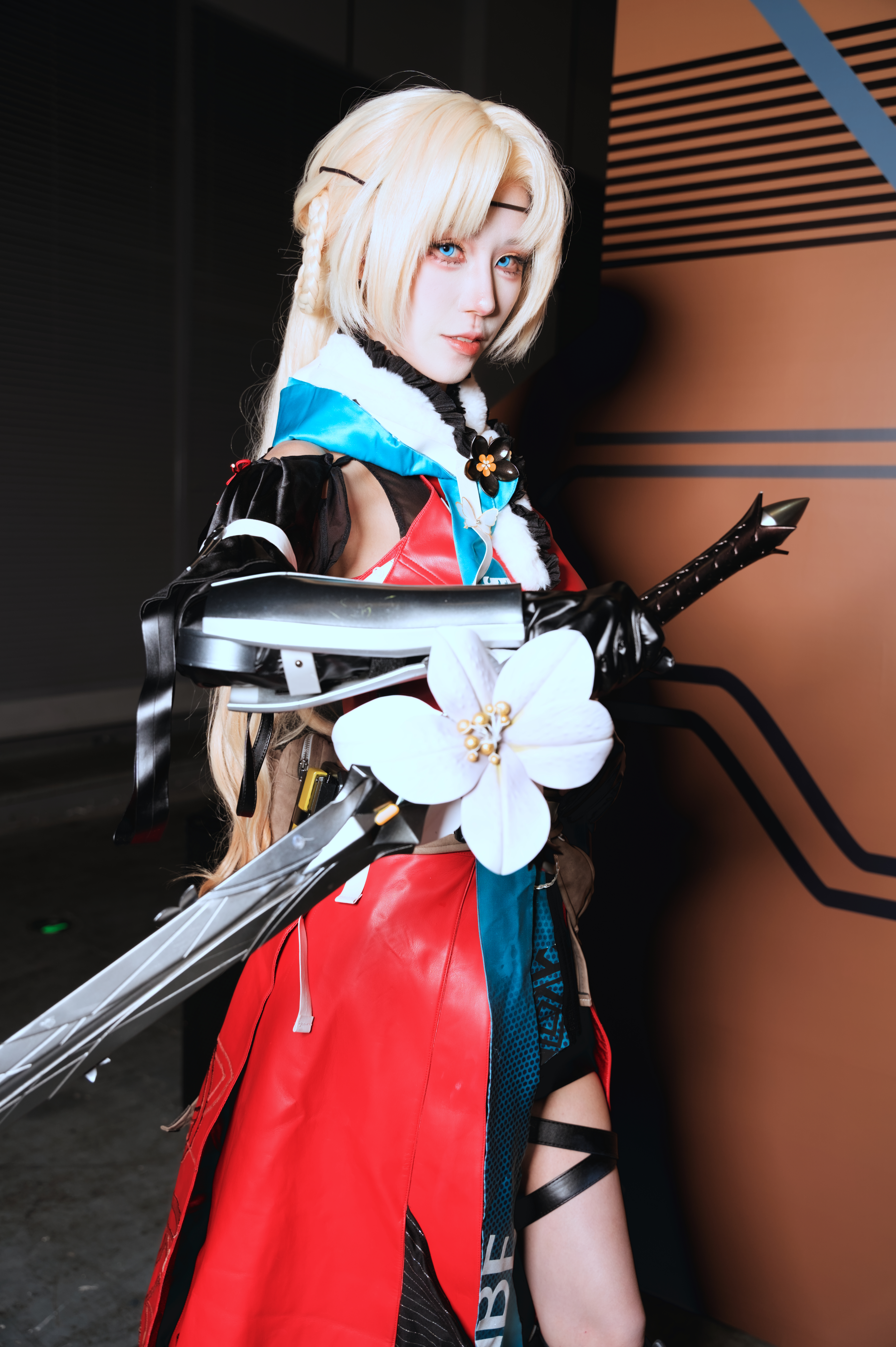
Cosplay of Ullrid, in Shanghai

Ullrid (乌尔丽德; Wūěrlìdé;)
Voiced by: Ju Huahua (Chinese); Yuka Saitō (Japanese); Moon Yoo-jeong (Korean)
A melee T-Doll armed with a langes Messer (5a), and the protagonist of the Sojourners of the Glass Island event. As the leader of a wandering commune of destitute Dolls somewhere between Otrokovice and Zlín in the contaminated zone, Ullrid was faced with the threat of her commune slowly running out of supplies, until they discover an abandoned thermoelectric power plant infested by ELIDs and containing all the necessities required for their survival. To the insistence of Ullrid, all decisions made by the commune are held to a democratic vote, however the abstention of many Dolls and their unwillingness to embark on a risky expedition to obtain supplies from the power plant creates constant conflict between Ullrid and the other commune members. After a narrow vote, the commune explores the power plant, discovering a large quantity of agricultural supplies and equipment, eventually concluding that the plant was originally intended as an experimental facility for growing plants within the contaminated zone, and that the ELIDs were being attracted to the plant by the cooling towers emitting Collapse radiation. They are attacked by defence automatons and a mysterious Doll guarding the experimental facility, causing significant casualties to the commune. After disabling the cooling towers and dispatching the hostile Doll, the commune decides to settle at the power plant.

Suomi (索米; Suǒmǐ;)
Voiced by: Tao Dian (Chinese); Aki Toyosaki (Japanese); Lee Bo-hee (Korean)
A T-Doll armed with a Suomi KP/-31 submachine gun originally part of Ullrid's T-Doll commune, who is found by the Commander while she was on an ill-fated expedition for supplies. Suomi is inherently Russophobic, due to the way her neural cloud was designed.

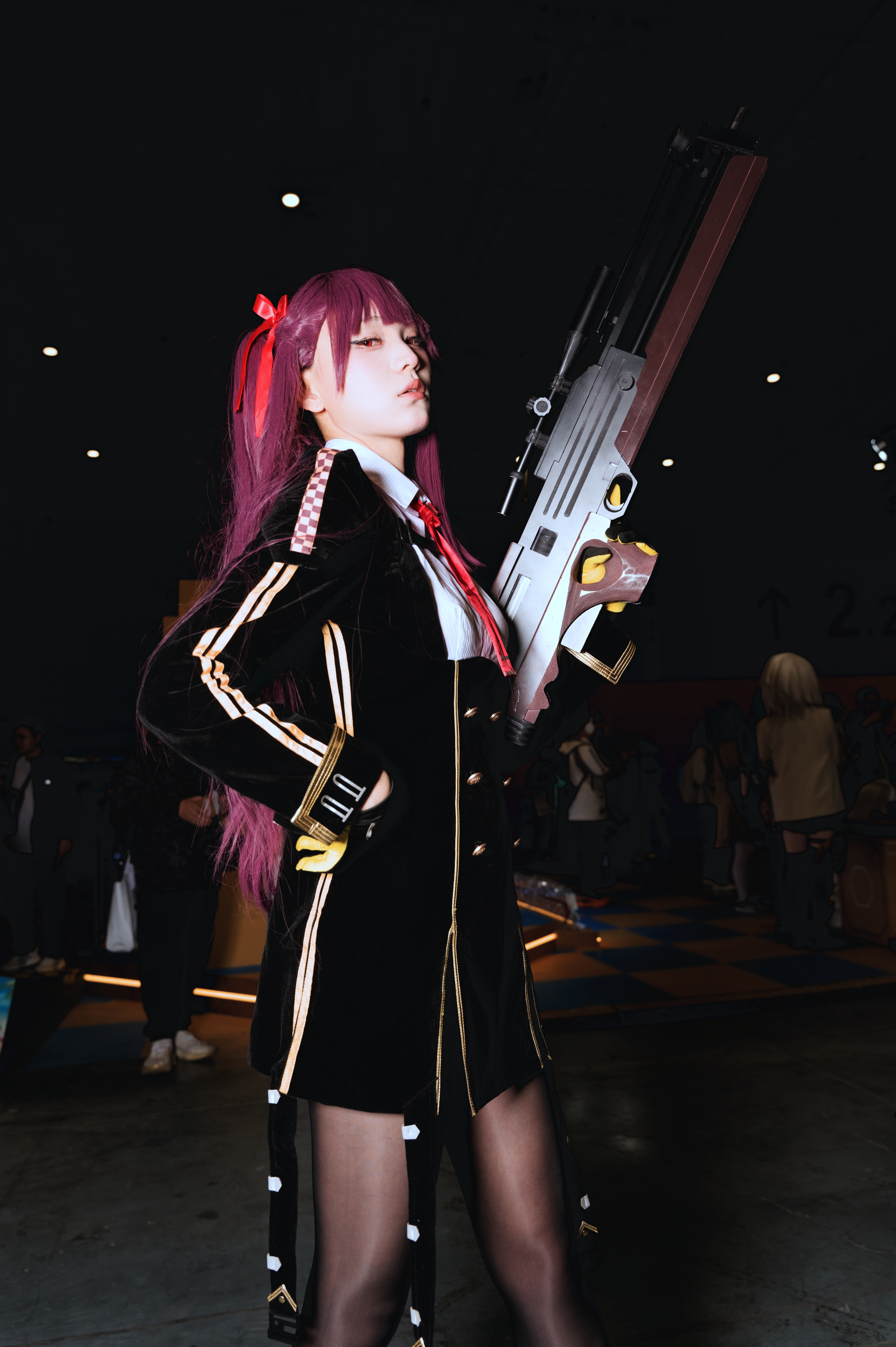
Cosplay of Makiatto, in Shanghai

Makiatto (玛绮朵; Mǎqǐduǒ;)
Voiced by: Xie Ying (Chinese); Haruka Tomatsu (Japanese); Lee Myeong-ho (Korean)
A sniper T-Doll formerly known as WA2000 in Girls' Frontline, and the protagonist of the Rhapsody Quartet event. Following the events of the previous game, Makiatto sought refuge at Zucchero Café, a coffee shop located within the satellite city of CHE-02 in Cherkasy, which is operated by Springfield and staffed by T-Dolls, as she awaits the expiry of the Commander's contract. One day whilst returning from a shopping trip, fellow Zucchero T-Dolls Sharkry and Centaureissi encounter an incident where security bots seemingly turn haywire and attack a car and its driver on the street. Amidst the confusion, the T-Dolls mistakenly confuse the driver's cargo for their own shopping boxes, and realise that the boxes they've carried back to the café contain military-spec weaponry. An emergency curfew is subsequently implemented across CHE-02, and Leva contacts Springfield, requesting assistance in apprehending the criminals involved in smuggling the weapons. With the aim of moving the illicit contraband out of the café to avoid trouble from the authorities and from criminal groups, Makiatto cuts the link between the security cameras at the warehouse district in Port Vantiny from the Department of Public Security's servers while Centaureissi moves the boxes via garbage truck, however soon discover that the area is heavily patrolled by security robots belonging to the weapon smugglers. Centaureissi is apprehended by one of the henchmen, however bluffs her way into convincing him that she was sent to deliver contraband. As she is taken to a cargo ship moored at the pier to meet the ringleader, Makiatto stealthily follows along, and a firefight ensues once Centaureissi's cover is blown by the driver originally transporting the weapons, who recognises her face. Following a rendezvous with Springfield and Sharkry, the group splits up to pursue the ringleader and to draw the attention of the Department of Public Security. As the ringleader is apprehended, police drones approach the scene, and the T-Dolls escape via the water.

Daiyan (黛烟; Dàiyān;)
Voiced by: Liu Zhixiao (Chinese); Masumi Tazawa (Japanese); Sa Moon-yeong (Korean)
A T-Doll and wandering guzheng musician formerly known as Type 95 in Girls' Frontline, and the protagonist of the Amidst Wings of Gray event. While travelling alongside fellow T-Dolls Jiangyu and Zhaohui, Daiyan witnesses a series of explosions from an ELID incursion breaching the quarantine wall at an intercontinental railway station, and discovers a damaged Doll lying unconscious on the ground. Upon rebooting her frame, the Doll turns out to be Colphne, who explains that she was separated from the Commander and Helena after an ELID attack. As Helena has a tracker planted on her, Colphne is able to pinpoint her location to an underground facility nearby. After passing PMC troops patrolling the area and reaching the facility, the group discover grotesque scenes of human experimentation. As they reach a massive pit, the team encounters Paradeus cultists committing mass suicide and feeding their bodies to a massive ELID below. Upon destroying the ELID and pulling Helena from its body, another Helena clone steps forth and reveals that the numerous clones were originally Paradeus ritual subjects. Following the brief reunion between the Commander and the ex-Griffin Dolls from Daiyan's party, as a hostile PMC storms the facility, the Commander receives communication from Makiatto and Centaureissi, who responded to the distress signal sent out by Dandelion following the drone crash, and are also making their way towards the facility.

Dushevnaya (杜莎妮; Dùshānī;)
Voiced by: Wu Zheru (Chinese); Eri Ōzeki (Japanese); Oh Ro-ah (Korean)
A sniper T-Doll with exposed mechanical joints who speaks with chūnibyō mannerisms, is formerly known as KSVK in Girls' Frontline, and is the protagonist of the Halting Station event. Immediately after the conclusion of Sojourners of the Glass Island, the Doll commune led by Ullrid begins to clear the power plant of hostiles with the intention of seeking refuge at the plant. Dushevnaya agonises over the decision of whether or not she should remain with the commune, and while together on a supplies run, Lotta expresses to Dushevnaya her desire to restart the experimental farm beneath the power plant. While initially doubtful that such a plan could ever come to fruition, Balthilde devises a plan to reactivate the facility's mechanism for lowering Collapse radiation. As the pair attempt to reactivate the device, a defence automaton is activated and identifies the Dolls as intruders, however the automaton is promptly destroyed as Ullrid arrives at the scene.

Centaureissi (桑朵莱希; Sāngduǒláixī;)
Voiced by: He Wenxiao (Chinese); Ami Koshimizu (Japanese); Kim Ga-ryeong (Korean)
A T-Doll dressed in a French maid outfit and formerly known as G36 in Girls' Frontline, who is the protagonist of the Bitter Thorns and Daisies story mini-campaign within the Zucchero Café event. Towards the latter portion of Amidst Wings of Gray, Springfield receives word of the Commander's dire situation from Dandelion after closing hours at Zucchero Café, and dispatches Centaureissi and Makiatto to provide assistance, who are transported to the Commander's location via attack helicopter, with Sharkry as its pilot. Surrounding the Paradeus underground research facility, six combat teams from the Mangi Security PMC disembark their IFVs and storm the site, making hostile contact with the Commander and Daiyan's party. Centaureissi and Makiatto engage teams of PMC troopers and break into the facility, where they meet with the Commander, and lead them towards the surface in preparation for helicopter extraction. As everyone is taken to a safehouse in Cherkasy, the Commander interrogates Helena D-68 for information on her origins, while Helena O-43 develops organ failure, necessitating the team to reach Lviv for her to receive urgent medical attention. In an effort to minimise confusion, the Commander suggests that Helena D-68 adopt the name Melanie, to which she agrees.

Springfield receives a call from an informant from her intel network, warning them of impending danger, prompting Springfield to suggest everyone's immediate relocation to the safehouse. Groza makes an urgent call to the Commander, reporting the Elmo MBV as under attack by Mangi Security PMC, prompting the team to split in two, with Springfield and Makiatto escorting Helena to Lviv, and the rest of the team returning to the Elmo to provide combat support. After fending off the PMC attackers, a distress signal is sent from Dier, the technician for Squad 404, who is quickly located, extracted, and brought aboard the Elmo. As Groza explains that the contents of Sextans' neural cloud were deliberately damaged when she connected to it to gather information from her, Dier notices that Sextans' unusual Doll frame has an epidermal layer made up of living cells. Melanie inspects Sextans, recognising her body as made from ELID cell structures, and they observe her beginning to rapidly self-repair. Sextans reactivates, however the affiliation data in her neural cloud is missing, allowing Dier to configure Sextans so that the Commander gains full ownership and control over her. Because Sextans' IFF system marks Mangi Security PMC units as friendlies, they decide to use Sextans to locate Mangi PMC troops in attempt to find Squad 404. Centaureissi discovers gravely injured Survey Corps troopers ambushed by Mangi PMC as they were setting up a signal base station, and upon securing the station, they intercept comms from Squad 404, obtaining their coordinates.

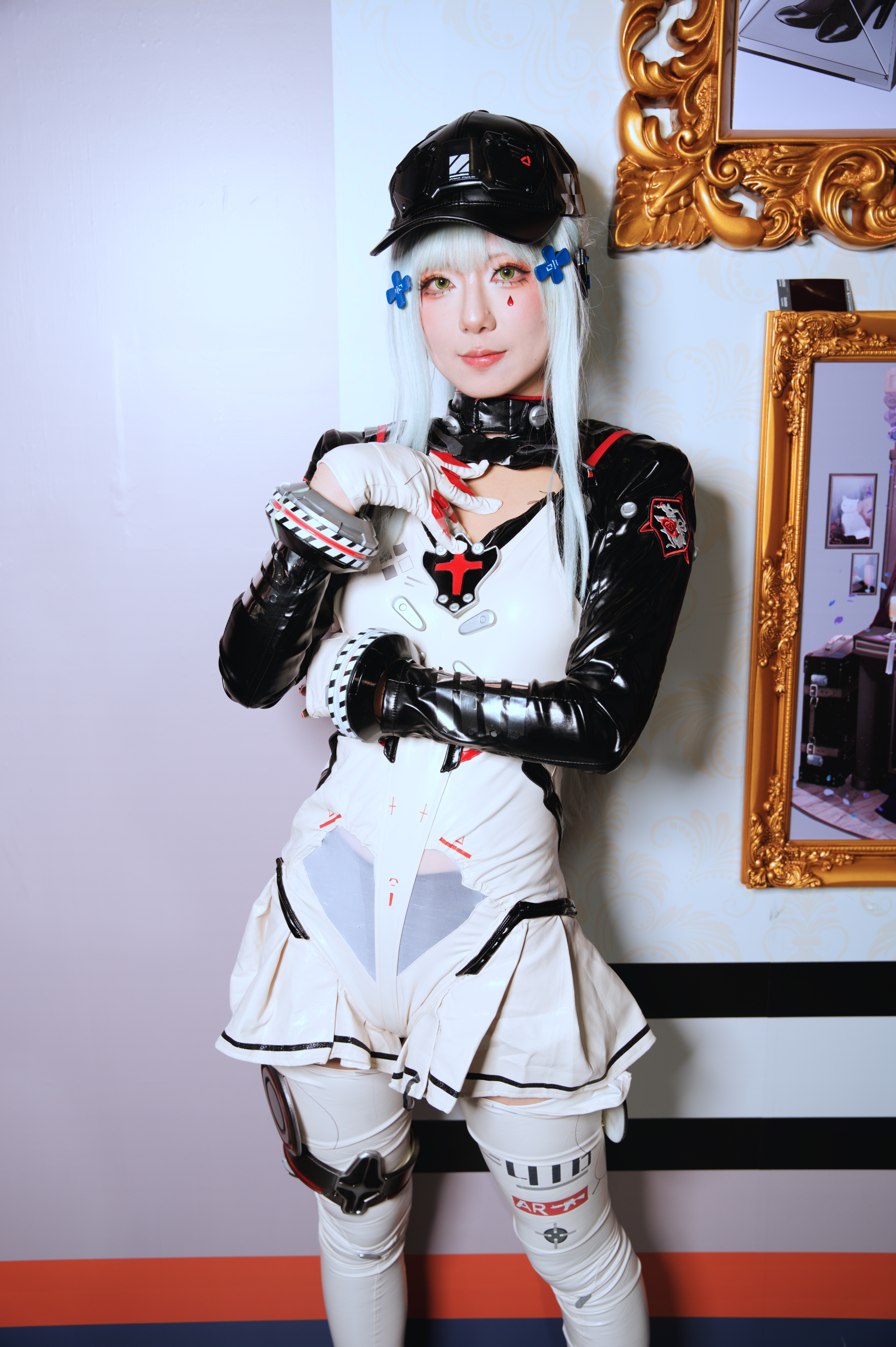
Cosplay of Klukai, in Shanghai

Klukai (可露凯; Kělùkǎi;)
Voiced by: Zhong Ke (Chinese); Ai Nonaka (Japanese); Jang Chae-yeon (Korean)
A T-Doll serving as the leader of Squad 404 and formerly known as HK416 in Girls' Frontline, who is the primary protagonist of the Aphelion event. While out investigating the Yellow Zone in northeastern Slovakia for signs of Paradeus activity at the behest of Leva, Klukai and Mechty are repeatedly attacked by groups of unidentified mechs. Following a chance encounter and tense standoff with a platoon belonging to the Environmental Survey Corps of the URNC, the pair agree to provide the URNC troops with military assistance against ELIDs as they make their journey towards the nearest human settlement, so that they can re-establish communications with the rest of Squad 404. Reaching the settlement, Klukai learns that the civilian cellular signals in the region are out of service, and exchanges a bribe with the URNC platoon leader to use their communications channels to contact Andoris and Belka, the two other Squad 404 members, whom they rendezvous with. Under attack by a large-size ELID, the Survey Corps platoon sends out a request for assistance, and Squad 404 manages to severely injure the creature, which then promptly makes an escape.

Mechty (米什缇; Mǐshítí;)
Voiced by: Zhang Jen (Chinese); Ayaka Fukuhara (Japanese); Kim Ah-rong (Korean)
A lethargic T-Doll belonging to Squad 404 and formerly known as G11 in Girls' Frontline, who is the secondary protagonist of the Aphelion event.

Vector (维克托; Wéikètuō;)
Voiced by: Chen Yanyi (Chinese); Saori Hayami (Japanese); Son Seon-young (Korean)
A T-Doll with pyromaniacal tendencies, armed with a KRISS Vector submachine gun, and the protagonist of the Escape from Cyborg event.

Yoohee (幼熙; Yòuxī;)
Voiced by: Ge Lin (Chinese); Yukiyo Fujii (Japanese); Yeo Yoon-mi (Korean)
A K-pop performer T-Doll who is formerly known as K2 in Girls' Frontline, and is the protagonist of the Neural Migration: Silvered Whispers event.

Zhaohui (朝晖; Zhāohuī;)
Voiced by: Mu Fei (Chinese); Rina Satō (Japanese); Kang Si-hyeon (Korean)
A T-Doll armed with a CS/LS6 submachine gun who is part of Daiyan's performing troupe, and is the protagonist of the Echo of Dawn event.

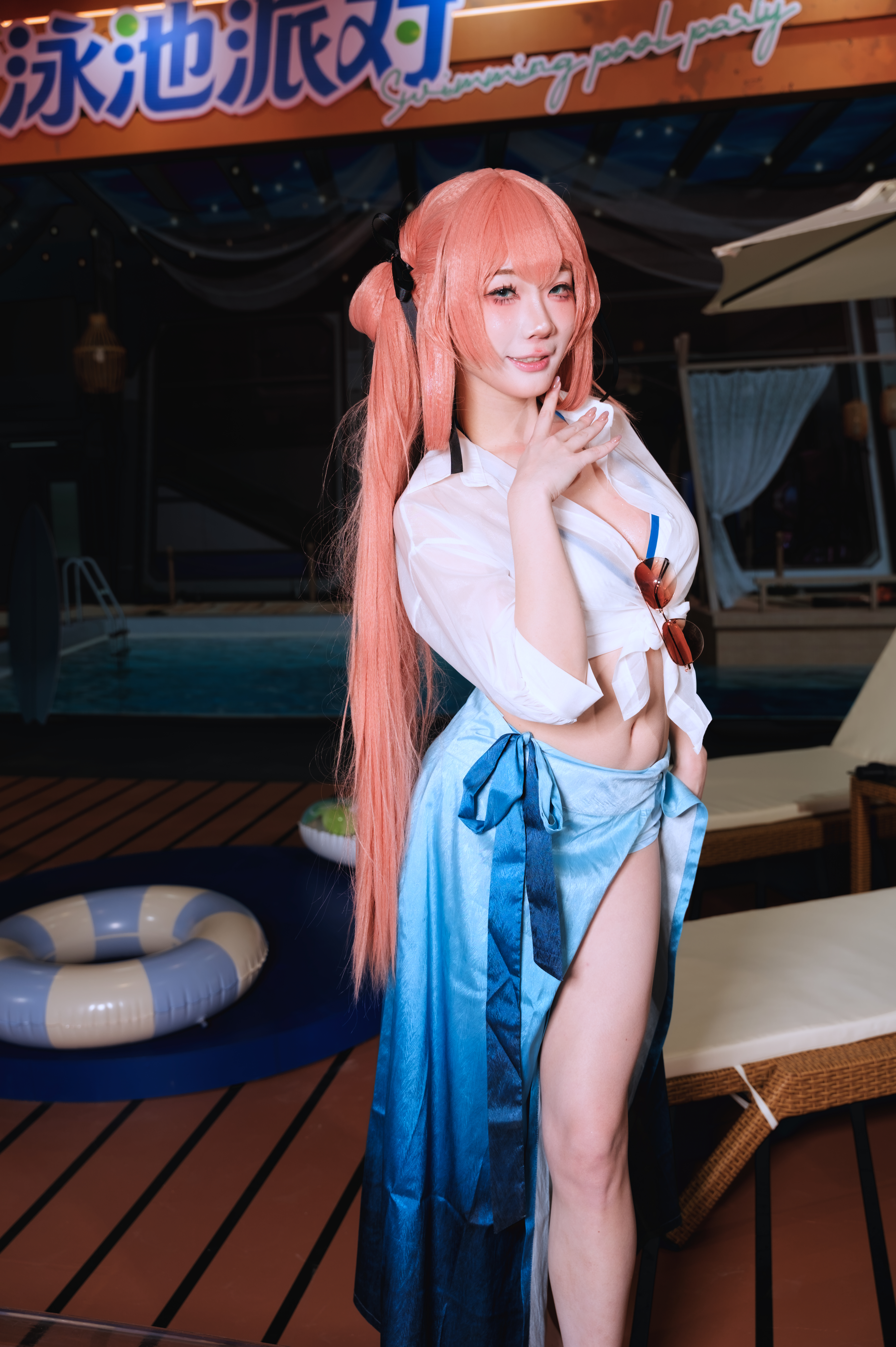
Cosplay of Springfield, in Shanghai

Springfield (春田; Chūntián;)
Voiced by: Liang Shuang (Chinese); Yui Horie (Japanese); Yoon Ah-yeong (Korean)
The T-Doll manager of Zucchero Café in Cherkasy, armed with a M1903 Springfield rifle, who is the primary protagonist of the Mimisbrunnr's Loop event.

Peri (佩莉; Pèilì;)
Voiced by: Yan Yeqiao (Chinese); Naomi Mukaiyama (Japanese); Shin Na-ri (Korean)
A black marketeer T-Doll armed with a Heckler & Koch MP5 submachine gun, who is the secondary protagonist of the Mimisbrunnr's Loop event.

Qiuhua (秋桦; Qiūhuà;)
Voiced by: Zhuo Siyuan (Chinese); Yuka Ōtsubo (Japanese); Kim Tae-ri (Korean)
A wandering chef T-Doll formerly known as Type 97 in Girls' Frontline, and the protagonist of the Life Rekindled event.

Nikketa (妮基塔; Nījītǎ;)
Voiced by: Zhang Yu (Chinese); Ai Kakuma (Japanese); Ahn Soo-hyun (Korean)
A police officer T-Doll formerly known as VSK-94, and the protagonist of the Ex Umbra event.

Belka (比悠卡; Bǐyōukǎ;)
Voiced by: Zhao Shuang (Chinese); Nozomi Yamamoto (Japanese); Kim Soon-mi (Korean)
Another member of Squad 404, formerly known as G28. She is the protagonist of the 404 Found story within the Interstice of Reminiscence event.

Andoris (安朵丝; Ānduǒsī;)
Voiced by: Zhang Jing (Chinese); Kiyono Yasuno (Japanese); Lee Seul (Korean)
The final member of Squad 404, armed with a G36K, and the protagonist of the Into the Shadows story within the Interstice of Reminiscence event.

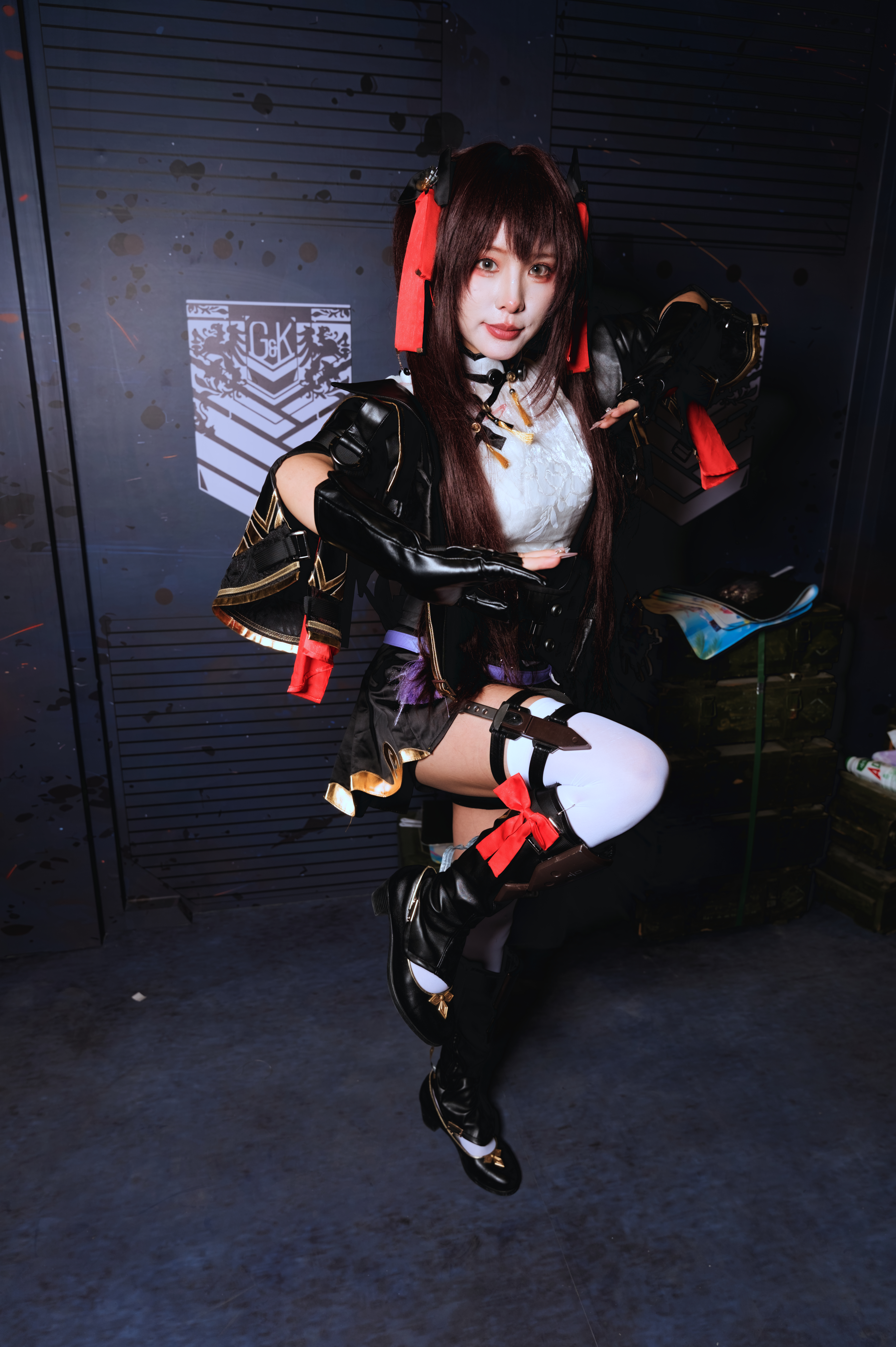
Cosplay of Jiangyu, in Shanghai

Jiangyu (绛雨; Jiàngyǔ;)
Voiced by: Chen Yu (Chinese); Ayane Sakura (Japanese); Kim Ye-rim (Korean)
A wandering performer travelling alongside Daiyan who is formerly known as Type 97, and the protagonist of the Vestigial Display story within the Interstice of Reminiscence event.

Florence (芙洛伦; Fúluòlún;)
Voiced by: Chen Yang (Chinese); Mao Ichimichi (Japanese); Kim Chae-rim (Korean)
A medical specialist Doll formerly known as PA-15 in Girls' Frontline, and the protagonist of the Thriller Wonderland event.

Lind (琳德; Líndé;)
Voiced by: Cai Na (Chinese); Mariko Honda (Japanese); Cho Kyung-yi (Korean)
A member of Griffin & Kryuger's Frostfall team, formerly known as AA-12 in Girls' Frontline, and the protagonist of the Turbulent Undercurrents event.

Robella (洛贝拉; Luòbèilā;)
Voiced by: Jiang Yingjun (Chinese); Ayaka Fukuhara (Japanese); Joo Ye-jin (Korean)
Former member of the Anti-Rain team from the previous game, where she was known by the name RO635, and the secondary protagonist of the Deep Oblivion event after Leva.

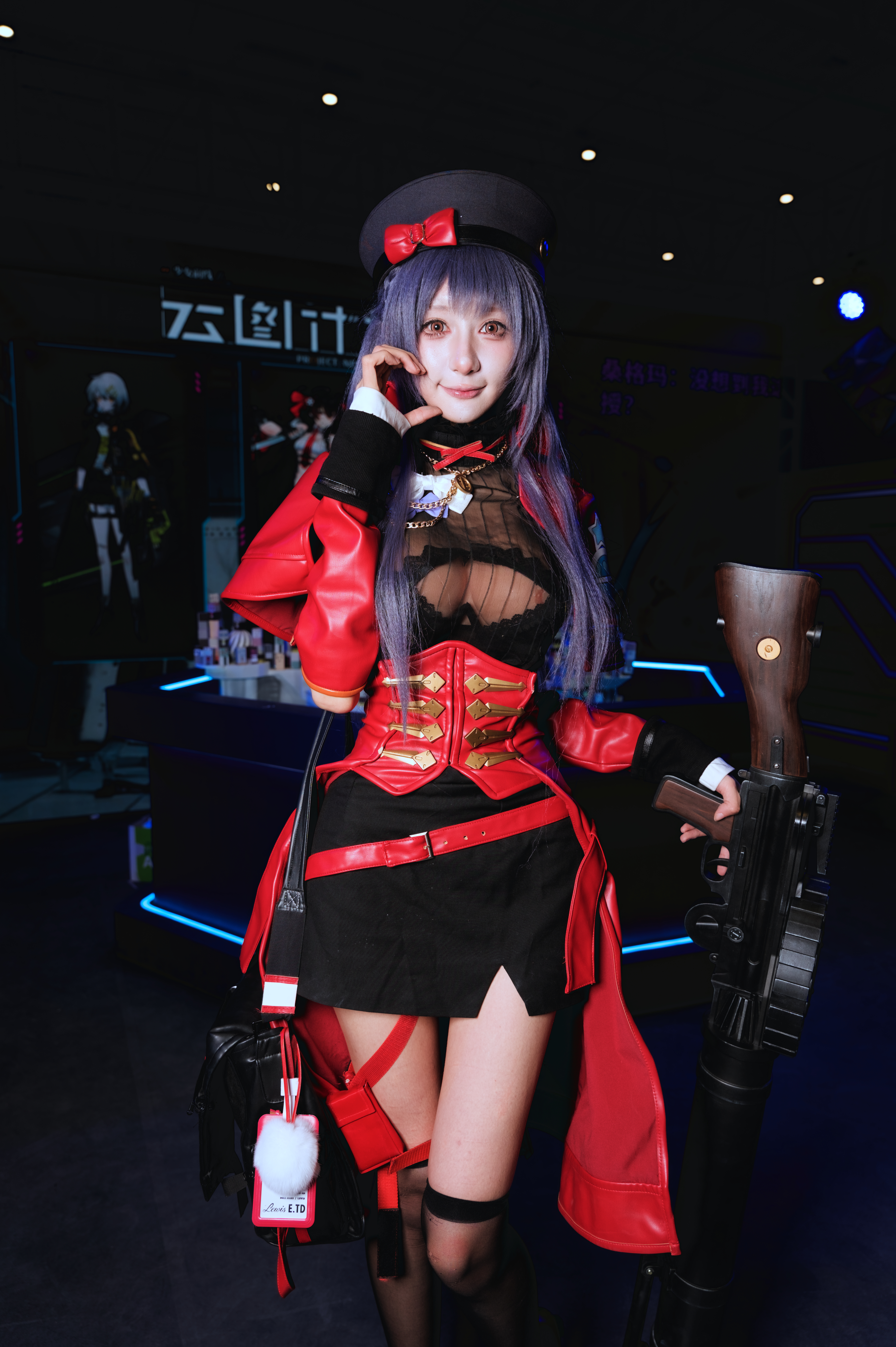
Cosplay of Lewis, in Shanghai

Lewis (刘易斯; Liúyìsī;) (Note: Pronounced as 路易士 (Lùyìshì;) in the Taiwanese localisation)
Voiced by: Wang Bingtian (Chinese); Yoko Hikasa (Japanese); Ryu Ji-ah (Korean)
Originally a civilian designer of toys, Lewis was eventually converted into a T-Doll and became affiliated with Griffin, where she uses a Lewis light machine gun, and later joined the research company 42LAB. She is the protagonist of the Project Neural Convergence event.

Sakura (樱花; Yīnghuā;)
Voiced by: Zhao Xin (Chinese); Ai Kakuma (Japanese); Kim Da-bin (Korean)
Known as Type 100 in the previous game, Sakura took on the role of a delivery driver after leaving Griffin, and is the protagonist of the Advance! Miss Courier! event.

Alva (埃芙; Āifú;)
Voiced by: Duan Yixuan (Chinese); Manami Numakura (Japanese); Yoon Eun-seo (Korean)
A T-Doll from the Bureau of State Security of the Neo-Soviet Union, known as AN-94 in the previous game. She is the new leader of Task Force DEFY, and the primary protagonist of the Corposant event.

Voymastina (威玛西娜; Wēimǎxīnà;)
Voiced by: Ye Zhiqiu (Chinese); Yūko Kaida (Japanese); Kwon Seon-yeong (Korean)
Another member of Task Force DEFY, Voymastina was the most powerful T-Doll in the entire Neo-Soviet Union, and was known as AK-15 in the previous game. She is the secondary protagonist of the Corposant event.

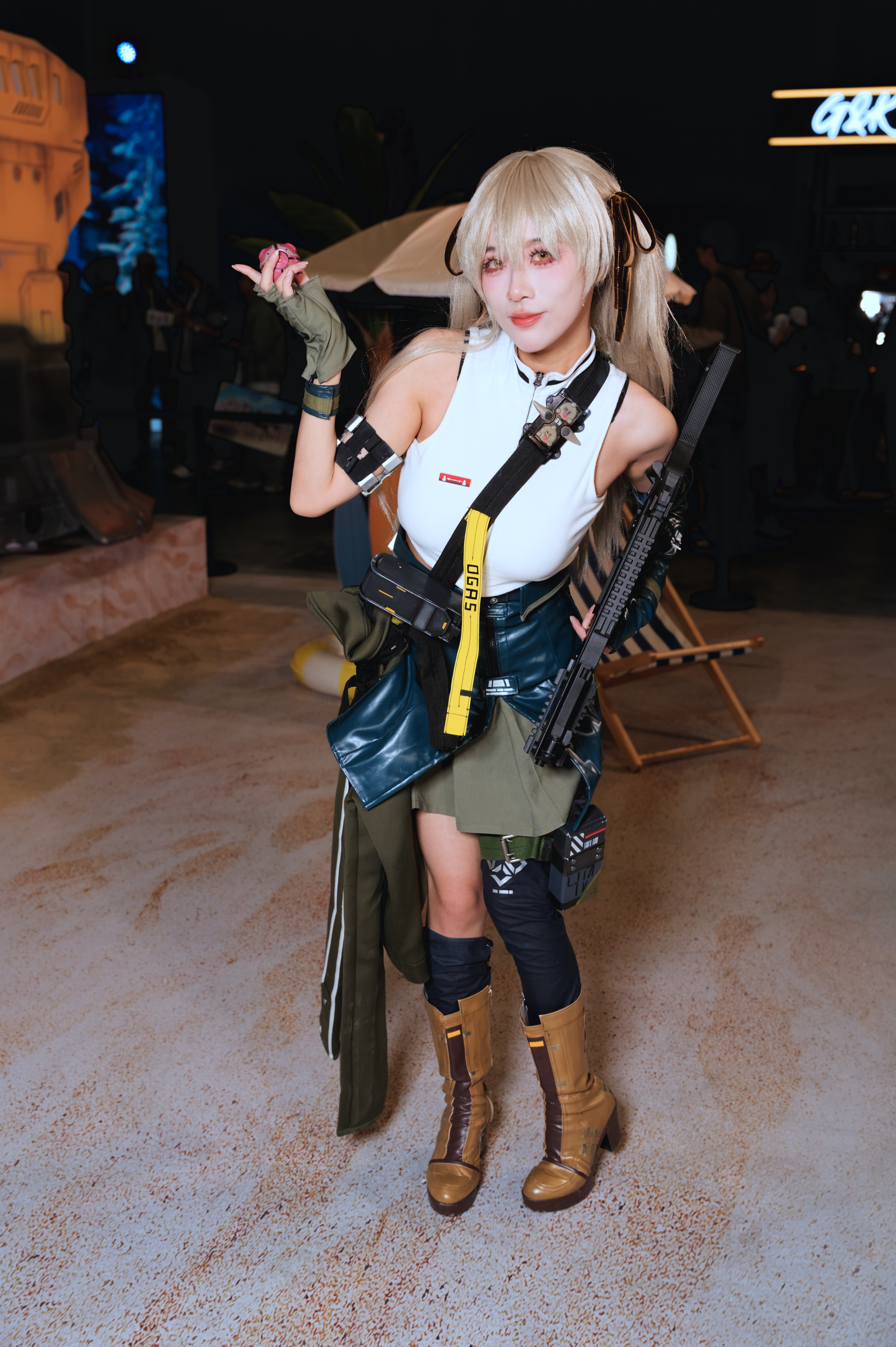
Cosplay of Lainie, in Shanghai

Lainie (莱妮; Láinī;)
Voiced by: Jing Chen (Chinese); Emi Uema (Japanese); Ahn Su-hyeon (Korean)
Formerly known as UMP40, she was an OGAS personality born from Leva's neural core during the events of the previous game, who has been reborn into a T-Doll body. She is the protagonist of the Breaking Butterfly event.

Helen (海伦; Hǎilún;)
Voiced by: Yang Ruixin (Chinese); Yūko Kaida (Japanese); Kim Yoon-chae (Korean)
Following the conclusion of the previous game, where she was known as DP-12, Helen joined the Mangi PMC as a corporate employee. She is the primary protagonist of the Antiparallel event.

Phaetusa (翡图萨; Fěitúsà;)
Voiced by: Zhao Qiurong (Chinese); Ryoka Yuzuki (Japanese); Kim Jin-ah (Korean)
A T-Doll with a neural cloud hosting two opposing personalities, armed with a sword. Alongside Lambertia (the antagonist of Sojourners of the Glass Island), she was one of the Dolls originally assigned as custodians of the agricultural experimentation facility at the Marley thermal power plant near Otrokovice, and is the secondary protagonist of the Antiparallel event.

Basti (贝丝蒂; Bèisīdì;)
Voiced by: Luan Xiangjin (Chinese); Hikaru Akao (Japanese); Kang Hae-na (Korean)
A mentally-ill catgirl dressed in jirai-kei attire, formerly known as Mk23 in the previous game, and the protagonist of the Needy Catgirl Overload event.

Loreley (罗蕾莱; Luólěilái;)
Voiced by: Hao Zheng (Chinese); Yuka Saitō (Japanese); Kwon Young-ji (Korean)
An agent from the Bureau of State Security who was known as DSR-50 in the previous game, and is the primary protagonist of the Dawnforger event.

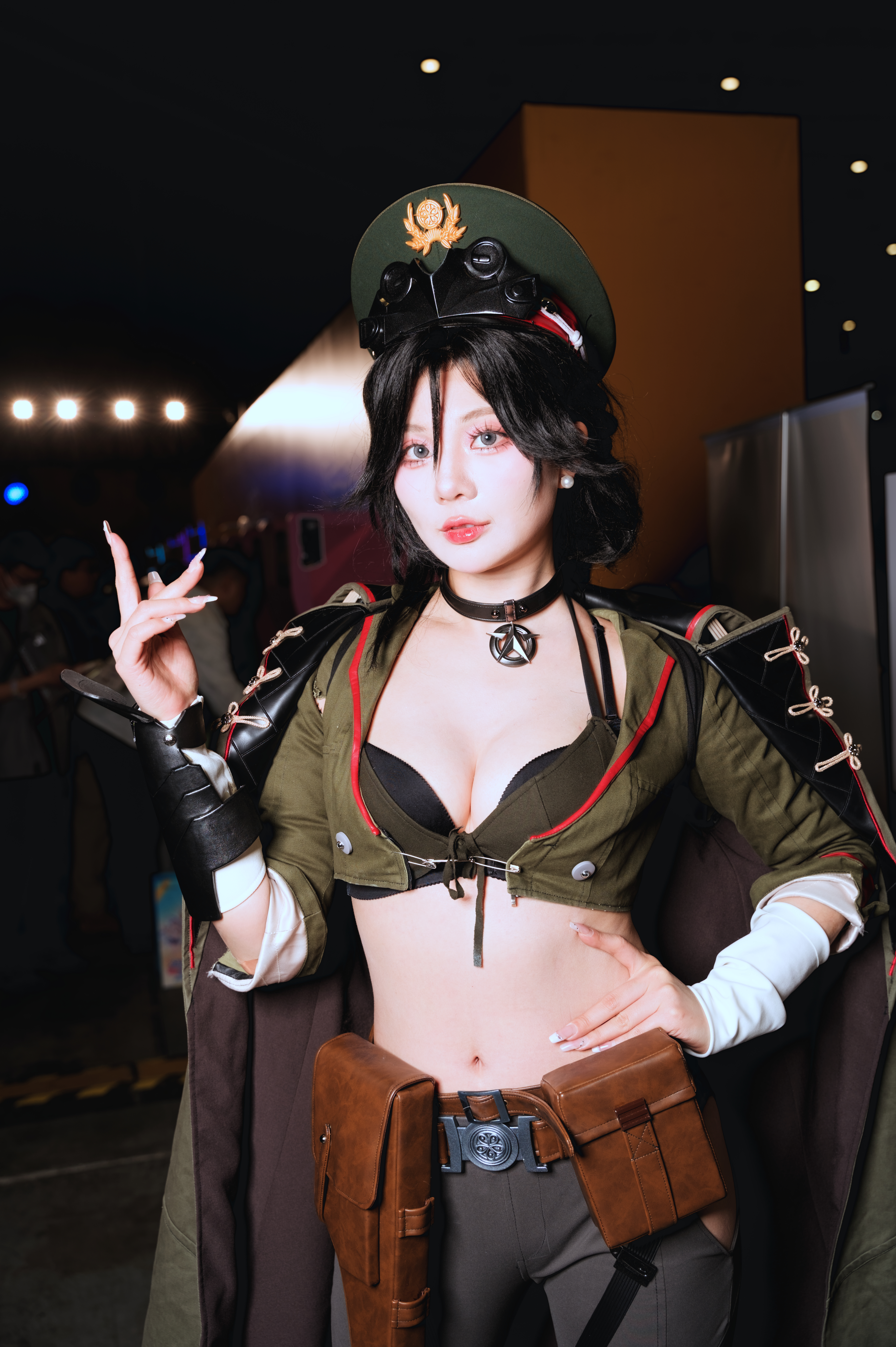
Cosplay of Liushih, in Shanghai

Cheyanne (夏安; Xià'ān;)
Voiced by: Pan Danni (Chinese); Yui Ogura (Japanese)
Known as M200 in the previous game, and the secondary protagonist of the Dawnforger event. Following the disbanding of Griffin, Cheyanne became a sniper for NOMFA.

Liushih (刘莳; Liúshì;)
Voiced by: Sun Yanqi (Chinese); Momo Asakura (Japanese)
A combat Doll who rides on horseback, formerly known as General Liu rifle in the previous game, and the protagonist of the Fortune Gallops, Spring Arrives event.

Soppo (索普; Suǒpǔ;)
Voiced by: Hei Te (Chinese); Yukari Tamura (Japanese)
Formerly known as M4 SOPMOD II in the previous game, where she was part of the Anti-Rain team. Initially working on behalf of NOMFA as part of their investigation into the Girard Group during Deep Oblivion, she is later one of the protagonists of the Chiral Redundancy event.

== Development ==
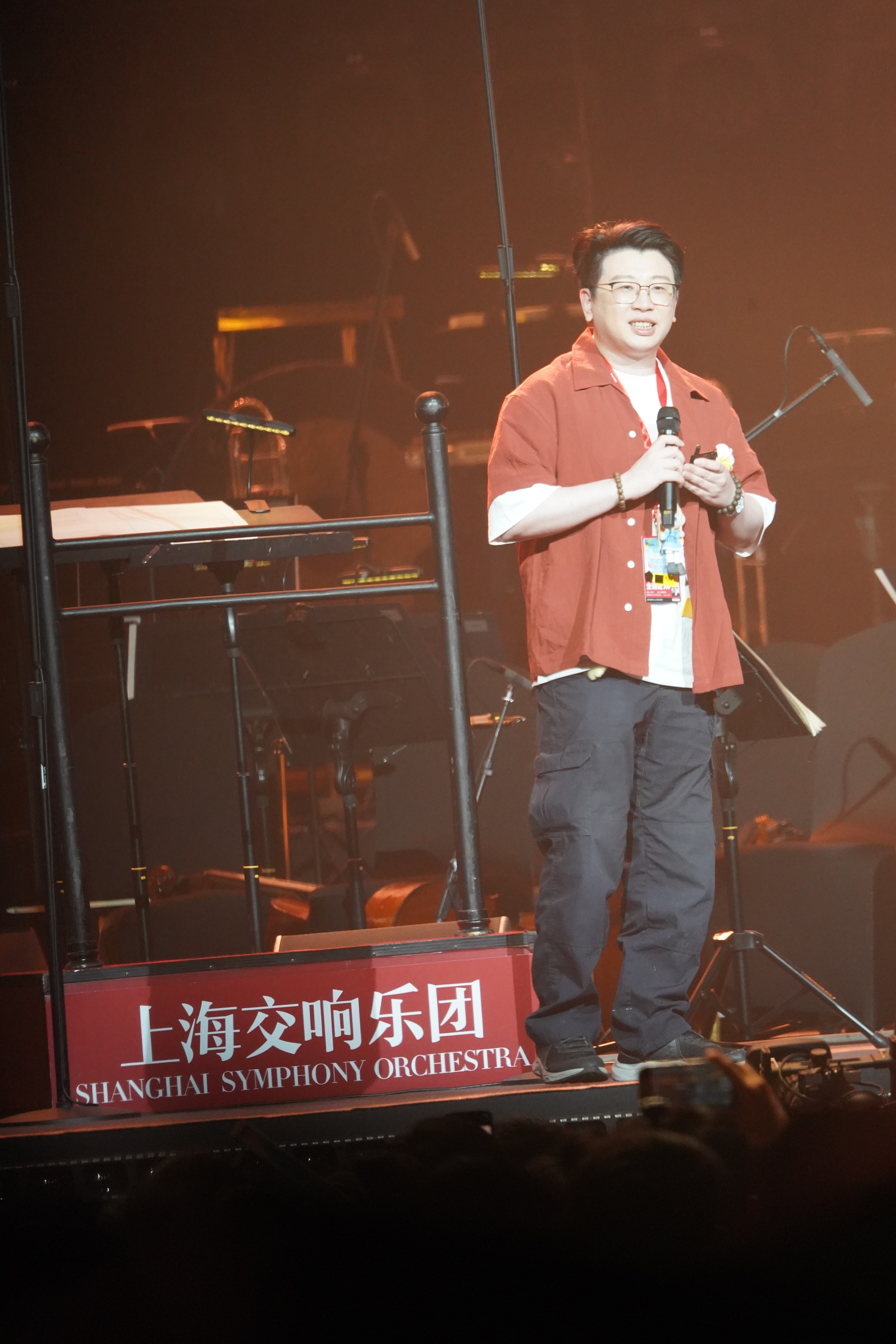
Yuzhong, the CEO of Sunborn and producer of the game

During a livestream in May 2020 celebrating the fourth anniversary of Girls' Frontline, game producer Yuzhong announced four new games set within the Girls' Frontline universe. Girls' Frontline 2 was described as a tactical game with exploration and character progression mechanics. The development team initially explored a variety of potential genre options, including life simulation and real-time strategy games, however eventually opted for a turn-based tactical game as the developers had prior experience with the genre, considered it an ideal genre for storytelling, and because control schemes for the genre are intuitive on both mobile and PC platforms.

Yuzhong states in a 2021 interview that Girls' Frontline 2 is the studio's first attempt at creating a 3D game. As a departure from the previous game's simpler design, Girls' Frontline 2 utilises a freely adjustable third-person top-down perspective. The production team also combined the usage of more realistic-looking physically based rendering for objects and environments alongside the non-photorealistic rendering of animesque characters as part of their design of the game's aesthetic, seamlessly combining the characteristics of moe and realism together without breaking immersion. Battle maps with a variety of indoor and outdoor settings were created, along with variations in time-of-day and season, to create an atmosphere of realism for the game's post-apocalyptic wasteland setting. In 2023, Sunborn Network Technology (the parent company of MICA Team, based in Xuhui, Shanghai) filed patents for various rendering components of the game, including "silk stocking object rendering method and device" (Note: See Google Patents CN116883580A, WIPO CN116883580.) and "clothing fluff rendering method and device" (Note: See Google Patents CN116883567A, WIPO CN116883567.), with the China Patent Office. The game also uses a special processing method to display smooth visual effects on the combat grid when depicting in-battle status effects, blending effects across neighboring grid tiles to avoid blocky appearances, with opacity based on a signed distance field calculated from each tile's sides or corners.

Based on player feedback following the game's initial release in China, the difficulty of campaign levels was lowered, and various optimisations and quality-of-life adjustments were implemented. Successive patches have progressively introduced new game modes and features over time, such as the Aphelion and Deep Oblivion major updates which introduced the Boundary Push game mode and the explorable Crew Deck respectively. The developers have announced future plans to introduce a new support system utilising vehicles and drones, to be implemented in 2026.

In January 2025, MICA Team collaborated with embroidery artist Zhang Xue, a practitioner of Suzhou embroidery as registered by the State Council of the People's Republic of China as a National Intangible Cultural Heritage, in implementing an in-game embroidered costume for the character Makiatto based on Zhang's design; speaking to the Chinese government newspaper People's Daily in relation to the collaboration, Yuzhong states that "Generation Z players regard games as a spiritual vehicle [for] cultural identity... high-quality videogames can resonate with cultures around the world by showcasing the essence of Chinese civilisation".

MICA Team stated in an interview that the development cost for the game exceeds 100 million renminbi (US$13.7 million). The development turnaround time for each individual playable character is approximately 6 months. Studio recording for the Chinese and Japanese voice acting in new story chapters generally takes place one month before the release of major events on the Chinese server.

== Release ==
Map of countries by game publisher: Darkwinter Software HaoPlay Darkwinter Software (China region) THS Game Game not available

Development of Girls' Frontline 2 was first announced in May 2020, and the game received content review approval from the General Administration of Press and Publication of the People's Republic of China in March 2023. The game underwent numerous successive stages of closed beta testing on 29 June 2021, 18 October 2021, 20 July 2023, and 28 September 2023, and was released in China on 21 December 2023.

An English localisation for the game was announced on 20 July 2024, with pre-registrations commencing on 24 September 2024. The game was released in North America, Australia, New Zealand, Ireland and various other countries on 3 December 2024 (under the publisher Sunborn Network Technology, d/b/a Darkwinter Software), and in most European countries, the United Kingdom, Japan, South Korea, Taiwan and various other countries on 5 December 2024 (under the publisher Peiyu Digital Entertainment, d/b/a HaoPlay).

Sunborn collaborated with a variety of companies to promote Girls' Frontline 2 following the game's release; in China, collaborations with China Post, Beijing Yikatong, Baidu Maps and Gaode Maps took place, while in South Korea, the game held its first corporate collaboration with Frank Burger in 2025.

Although a one-year gap in content exists between the Chinese and global versions of the game at launch, Yuzhong expressed in a July 2025 interview with 4Gamer.net that the developers intend to gradually accelerate the release of game content for the global version so that it eventually matches the Chinese version, allowing them to unify all regions under a single client build. However, Yuzhong also emphasises that the pace of content acceleration should not occur at the expense of event scheduling, player reward flows or localisation preparations.

== Media ==
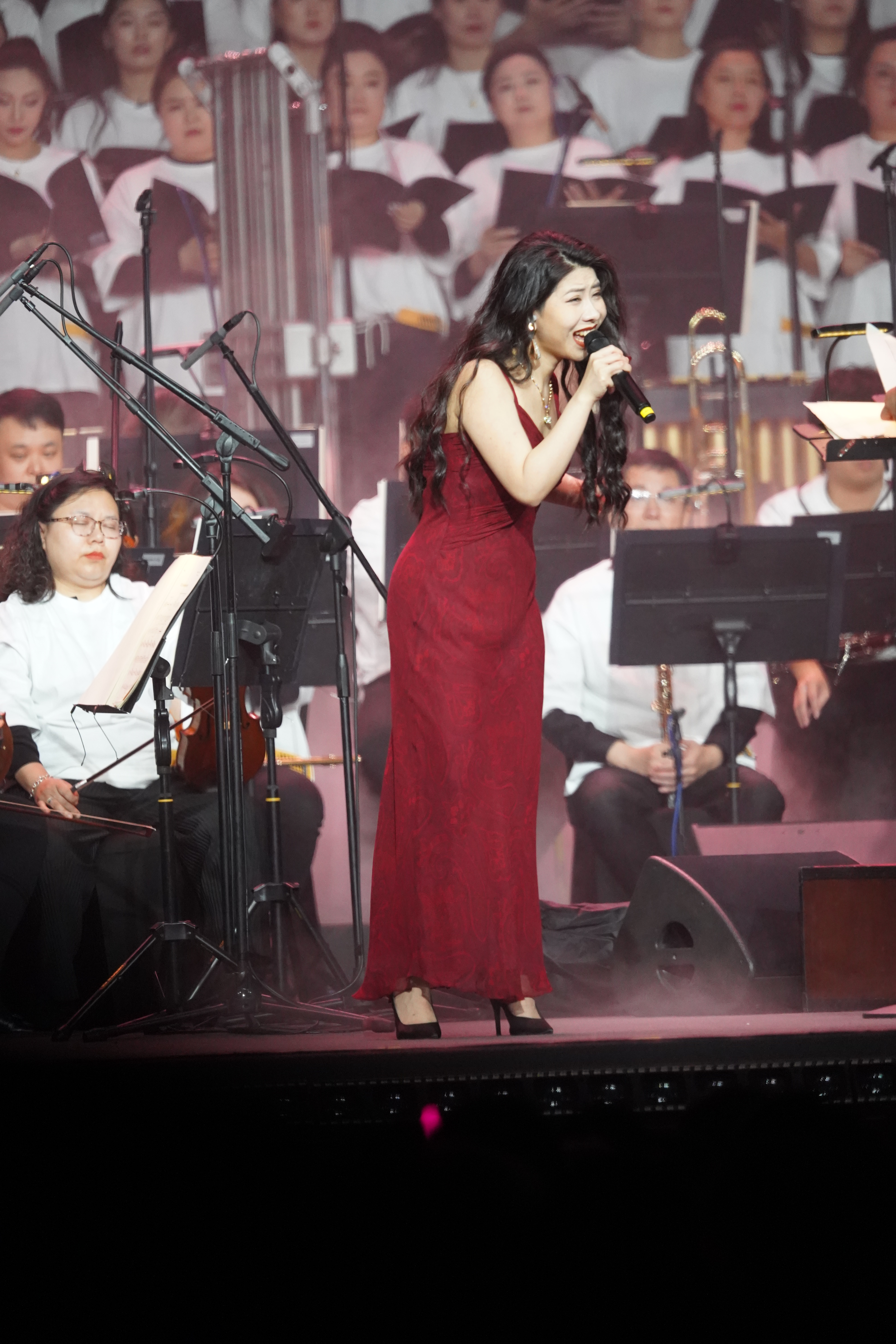
Kinoko performing "Unyielding Starlight" alongside the Shanghai Symphony Orchestra and Shanghai Opera House Choir at the Girls' Frontline 10th Anniversary Music Carnival, held at the Shanghai National Exhibition and Convention Center in May 2026

An image song for the character Yoohee, titled "Sparking Dream", is performed in Korean by vocalist Mill and guitarist Mmakinalee. On 22 September 2025, Vocaloid producer Hachiōji-P released a Squad 404-themed image song for the game, titled "Luminous Alive", featuring vocals by KMNZ Nero.

The game's theme song, "Unyielding Starlight" (小さな星明り), is performed by Rei Yasuda with Japanese and English vocals. The version with Korean vocals, titled "굽히지 않는 별", is performed by Raon, while the Chinese version "不屈的星光" is performed by Kinoko, (Note: Stage name of Huang Yuxin) the lead singer of Vanguard Sound.

== Reception ==
=== Chinese release ===
Pre-registrations for the Chinese version exceeded 4.74 million players prior to the game's release. On the game's day of launch in China, Girls' Frontline 2 reached the top 2 rank among all charting free-to-play games domestically.

A review for the Chinese version of the game by Gcores praised the game's aesthetics and animation quality. Similarly, Youxi Putao noted the high quality in animation and use of camera perspective for the game's exposition sequences, and that the game differentiates itself well from other animesque tactical games on the market. However, Gcores also reported that players in China were critical of early versions of the game, specifically in regard to the difficulty in learning the game's mechanics and the low strategic depth of its tactical combat system from the perspective of new players, and the unsatisfying plot exposition to some veteran players of the previous game. Through the use of player questionnaires and developer livestreams, gradual attempts were made by the developers to address the game's common faults prior to its global release. This in turn has led players to jokingly refer to the Chinese server as the "sixth open beta" server, when contrasted with the state of the game during the global server's launch.

Qian Hongyan, writing for Shanghai-based videogame news website CGames, attributes Girls' Frontline 2 as the original powderkeg which sparked the "if there are males, I won't play it" movement (Chinese: 「有男不玩」运动), an online campaign by male gamers in China between late 2023 and early 2024 whereby participants refused to play videogames that contained male playable characters that could be obtained via gacha. The boycott had a direct impact on the financial performance of games that did contain playable characters from both genders.

=== Global release ===
On 6 December 2024, game producer Yuzhong announced that two million players joined the global release of the game on its first day. The game charted at 3rd place on the Google Play Store and 5th place on the Apple App Store in South Korea immediately after release. According to the "2025 China videogame industry trends and future potential analysis report" released by Chinese analytics firm CNG, the global version of the game had a turnover of over 100 million renminbi (US$13.7 million) within the first 3 days of release. By the end of the year, the global version had an estimated total revenue of 400 million renminbi (US$54.8 million) across all platforms. South Korean games media ThisIsGame reported that the game reached 590,000 monthly active users (MAU) in South Korea during December 2024, making it the most active anime-style game in the country for that month, based on market data provided by Korean data analytics platform Mobile Index. 60% of the game's downloads occurred though natural inflow from organic growth, such as from fans of the predecessor game, while 30% of downloads came via advertising channels; active marketing was employed by the game's publishers, and in South Korea, the game had the second highest advertising share among mobile games on Korean-language YouTube channels.

Writing for ThisIsGame, Kim Seung-joo attributes a variety of factors behind the game's success in South Korea, including the existing popularity of the previous game along with its well-developed fandom subculture spanning secondary works and internet memes, the pricing of various in-game microtransactions between the 20,000 won to 60,000 won price point, the perception that the developers are sincere in their work as a passion project (with an example provided being the game's attention to detail to behaviours such as trigger discipline which would generally only be noticed by firearms enthusiasts), and the lowered difficulty hurdle to a game genre which otherwise is perceived as high-difficulty (citing the "hit rate" system of the XCOM series as a common frustration point of the genre, a mechanic noticeably absent from Girls' Frontline 2). He also remarks that many of the early fans of Girls' Frontline were students at the time, and in 2024 are now aged in their mid-to-late 20s with more disposable income, and thus naturally became more capable of making purchases in-game. According to audience insights from Sensor Tower, 45% of the game's playerbase are aged between 25 and 34, which is notably higher than the average figure of 37% for the same age bracket among other turn-based role-playing games, and this demographic is more likely to make in-game purchases.

Jang Min-young, writing for Sisa Journal, states that the turn-based tactical game genre is not a popular genre in the mobile gaming market, and that Girls' Frontline 2 is successful in easing the genre's usual barriers to entry. Des Miller of RPGFan names the game as the "Best Surprise of the Year" for 2024, noting that the game offers a satisfying variety in character builds and that the enjoyment of higher difficulty late-game maps revolves around finding optimum team compositions, while also praising the characters and narrative writing. Max Gallant of GameRant writes that the game's style won't appeal to many players, however is still an enjoyable free-to-play title with deep worldbuilding.

Immediately following the game's release on Steam on 11 February 2025, the version of the game published by Darkwinter (Note: The Darkwinter and HaoPlay versions of the game have separate storefront entries on Steam, and are region-locked based on the player's geolocation. Players located in countries where HaoPlay publishes the game cannot access the Steam page for the Darkwinter version, and vice versa; in addition, in-game player progression is not shared between the two versions of the game.) received "very positive" Steam user reviews; meanwhile, the version from publisher HaoPlay received much more lukewarm reviews, having only 67% of Steam reviews being positive, with common user complaints involving the price of microtransactions for the game being higher on Steam compared to other platforms and the standalone PC client, technical issues with the Steam launch, and insufficient communication and preparation by the publisher prior to the release.

In March 2025, following the release of the Aphelion major update, Girls' Frontline 2 topped the Apple App Store game ranking in South Korea, with other Asian regions closely following suit with the game ranking among the top 10 titles on iOS charts. The Aphelion update in particular is noted as a well-received turning point in the game's storytelling, reminiscent of the original writing style of Girls' Frontline. Between December 2024 and March 2025, the global iOS and Android revenue for Girls' Frontline 2 reached US$60 million based on estimates from Sensor Tower, and within this figure, the iOS and Android revenue for the South Korean market alone reached US$15 million, recording the highest sales among turn-based RPGs in South Korea during that time period, placing ahead of Honkai: Star Rail, Fate/Grand Order, Limbus Company and Brown Dust 2. The revenue per download (RPD) for the game in South Korea was US$46, representing the highest RPD across all regions, and ahead of Japan which had an RPD value of US$43. Girls' Frontline 2 also had the highest 30-day and 60-day retention rates among turn-based RPGs.
