= Brixia PM-5 =

- Type: Shotgun
- Place of origin: Italy

Service history
- Wars: War in Afghanistan

Production history
- Designer: Brixia Shotguns
- Designed: 1980s
- Manufacturer: Brixia
- Produced: 1980s-Present

Specifications
- Mass: 3 kg
- Cartridge: 12 gauge
- Action: pump-action
- Feed system: 7+1 round box magazine

The Brixia PM-5 is an Italian pump-action shotgun manufactured by Brixia Shotguns.

Shotgun, PM-5 rifle was developed by the Italian Company used by various police and military forces, including the French Navy. The PM-5 is almost unique in that it has a removable magazine, the magazine greatly improves the time and the balance of the charge. The Valtro PM-5 is available with either a fixed stock or a folding stock. The power system PM-5 is conventional, manually operated. The tube under the barrel serves as a guide for scrolling. The loader 7 rounds, plus one in the chamber.

It is unusual in that it takes a detachable box magazine. Both 7- and 10-round magazines have been manufactured, although the 7-round magazine is much more common. Renowned for their simplicity, lightweight and reliability, this pump action 12 GA shotgun has sold on the US market for as much as $1200.00. Currently PM-5 model produced by Brixia Shotgun in Italy. A company that bought Valtro Brand after it declare bankruptcy.

In Canada, Brixia Shotguns and famous PM-5, distributed by Savminter Enterprises.

== See also ==
- Hawk Industries Type 97
