= Hawk Industries Type 97 =

Hawk Industries (Norinco) Type 97 shotgun Type 97 18.4mm Riot Gun Series
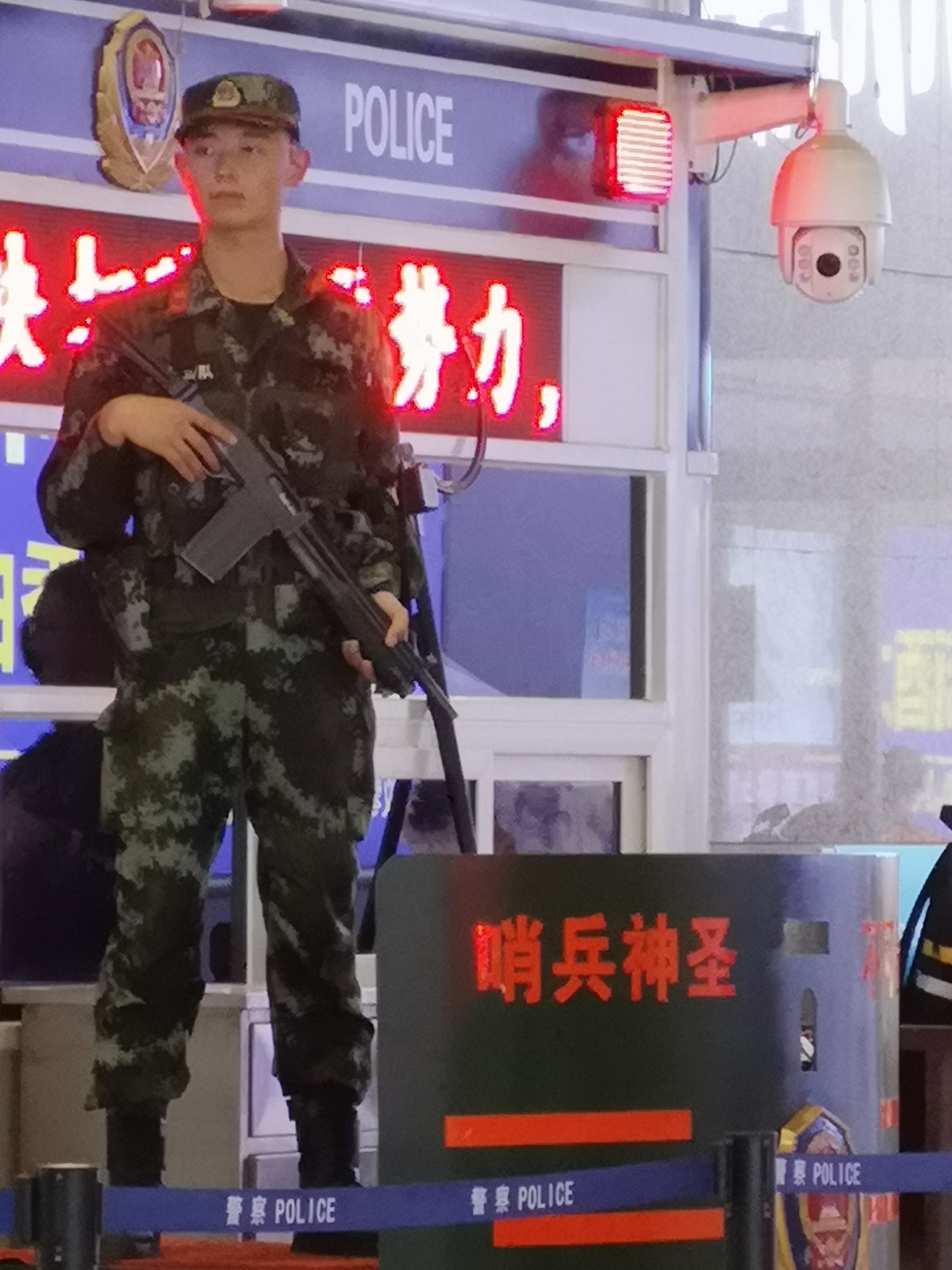
- Hawk Industries Type 97-2 in the hands of a Chinese police officer
- Type: Shotgun
- Place of origin: People's Republic of China

Service history
- Used by: See Users

Production history
- Designer: Hawk Industries
- Manufacturer: Norinco

Specifications
- Mass: 7 lb (3.18 kg)
- Length: 885 mm (34.8 in)
- Barrel length: 470 mm (18.5 in)
- Caliber: 18.4×76mm (12 gauge)
- Action: Depending on variant: Gas-operated or Pump action
- Feed system: 5+1 internal tube (civilian) or 5+1 detachable box magazine (Military/LE)
- Sights: Adjustable tangent sight (standard variant); Fixed iron sights (bullpup variant)

The Hawk Industries Type 97 (Chinese: 97式18.4mm防暴枪; pinyin: 97 Shì 18.4mm Fángbào Qiāng) is the factory and official Chinese military and police designation of a shotgun design patterned after the Remington Model 870, and manufactured by Hawk Industries, a division of the China North Industries Corporation (officially abbreviated as Norinco).

== History ==
Hawk Industries is based out of Qiqihar, Heilongjiang in northeast China and was founded in 1954.

The company designed the Type 97 in the late 90's as well a wide variety of shotguns for both export, and domestic use, and for civilian, hunting, police and military purposes.

The Type 97-1 has been adopted by Chinese forces as the "18.4mm Type 97-1 Anti-riot gun" (Chinese: 18.4mm防暴槍).

== Design ==
The Hawk Type 97 is patterned after the Remington 870. The base Type 97 configuration has a pistol grip and no stock, and often has a foregrip foreend.

The Hawk Type 97 is the base designation attributed to a variety of models with multiple configurations to suit different purposes and applications.

=== Operation ===
Type 97 shotguns are all chambered in 12-gauge; however, the internal barrel diameter is typically denoted metrically in China (18.4mm).

In both civilian and military/LE models, shells are fed into the chamber either semi-automatically (gas-operated) or by pump action depending on the system of operation configuration.

The civilian, and all other variants are capable of firing powerful 3 inch shotgun shells (76 mm), but can also fire shorter and weaker shells.

=== Civilian variants ===
Shells are loaded into a 5+1 internal under-barrel tube, and there is a heat shroud over the barrel. The civilian models are 35 inches (900 mm) long.

Non-lethal ammunition, such as rubber bullets and pepper-spray projectiles, typically lack the power to fully send the bolt carrier to the rear resetting the firing pin in semi-automatic firearms, and thus can only be loaded into pump action guns which rely on the user rather than the energy of the ammunition to cycle the shells.

=== Military / LE variants ===
Military/LE variants were designed and are exclusively produced and reserved for military and law enforcement applications. They can be factory-configured to mount tactical lights under the forend.

=== Variants ===
==== Hawk 97-2 ====
The Hawk Type 97-2, is patterned after the Remington Model 1100, and like the civilian model, is 35 inches (900 mm) long.

They are configured with folding stocks, and are 26 inches (670mm) long with the stock folded. The semi-automatic version is the Hawk Semi-Auto.

In Type 97-2, shells are loaded into 5-shell proprietary detachable steel box magazines.

The Type 97-2 features rifle-type sights with a front blade and adjustable tangent rear sight designed for accuracy when loading slugs and non-lethal ammunition.

==== Hawk Bullpup ====
The Hawk Pump-Action and Semi-Auto bullpup shotguns are more compact, being only 25 inches (630 mm) long compared to the Hawk 97-1 and 97-2 variants that are 35 inches (900 mm) long.

It resembles the QBZ-95 assault rifle, in large part due to the carrying handle and trigger guard with a notably large horizontal forward grip.

In pump-action configurations, the shotgun slide forend is completely separated from the rifle contours.

The Hawk Bullpup also has an integrated carrying handle with fixed sights.

== Users ==
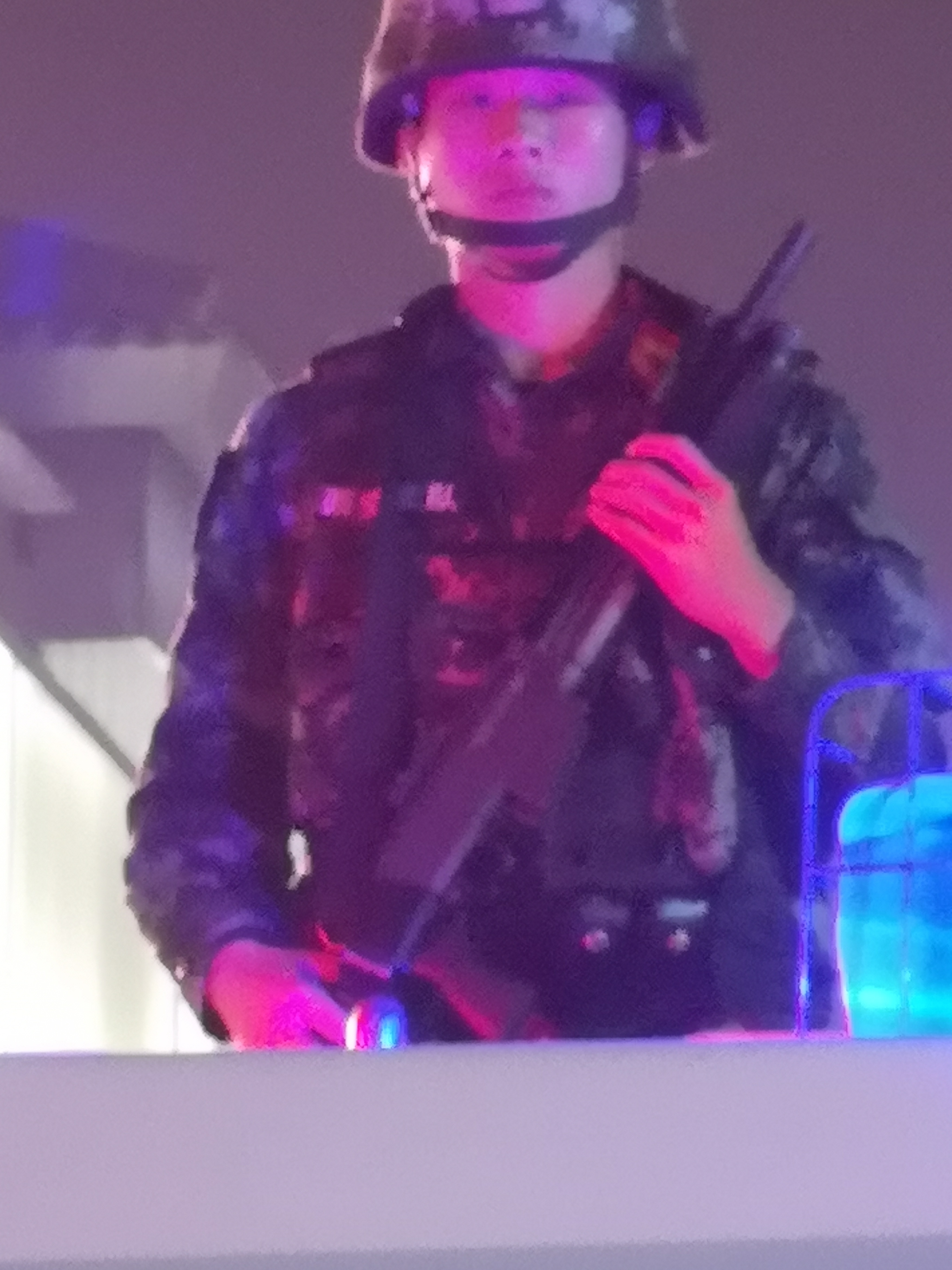
An armed Chinese policeman stands guard from a police vehicle with a Hawk Industries Type 97 shotgun in front of the Xi'an Gaoke Annex Building.

- People's Republic of China:
  - People's Liberation Army
  - People's Armed Police
  - China Coast Guard

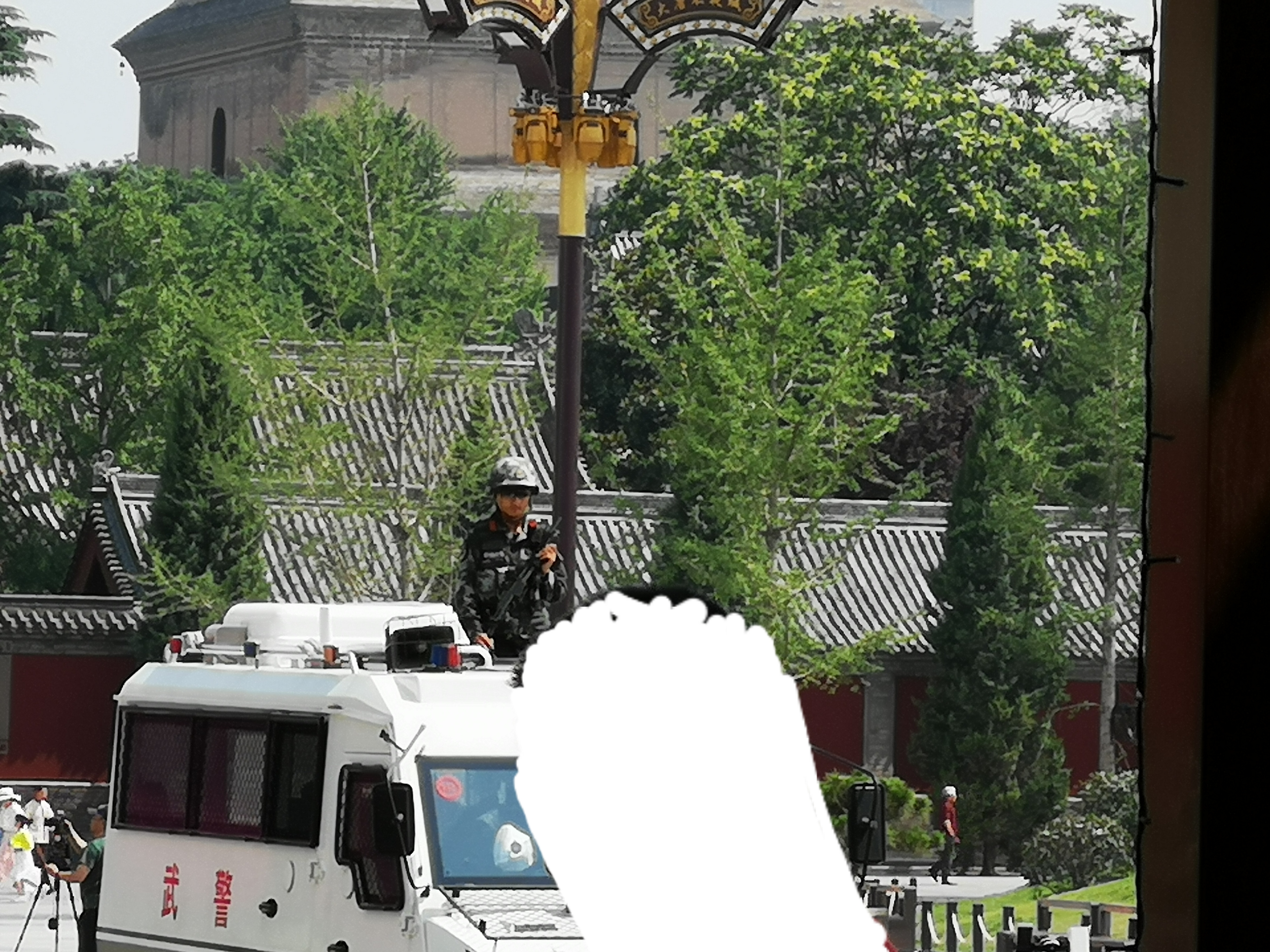
Another armed Chinese policeman stands guard from a police vehicle with a Hawk Industries Type 97 shotgun in front of the Dayan Pagoda South Square; the face of the bystander in front of the vehicle has been censored in respect of their privacy.

== See also ==
- Remington 870
- Remington 1100
- Saiga 12
- Vepr 12
- Combat shotgun
- QBS-09
- Brixia PM-5
