= Gamma Data =

Chinese research institute

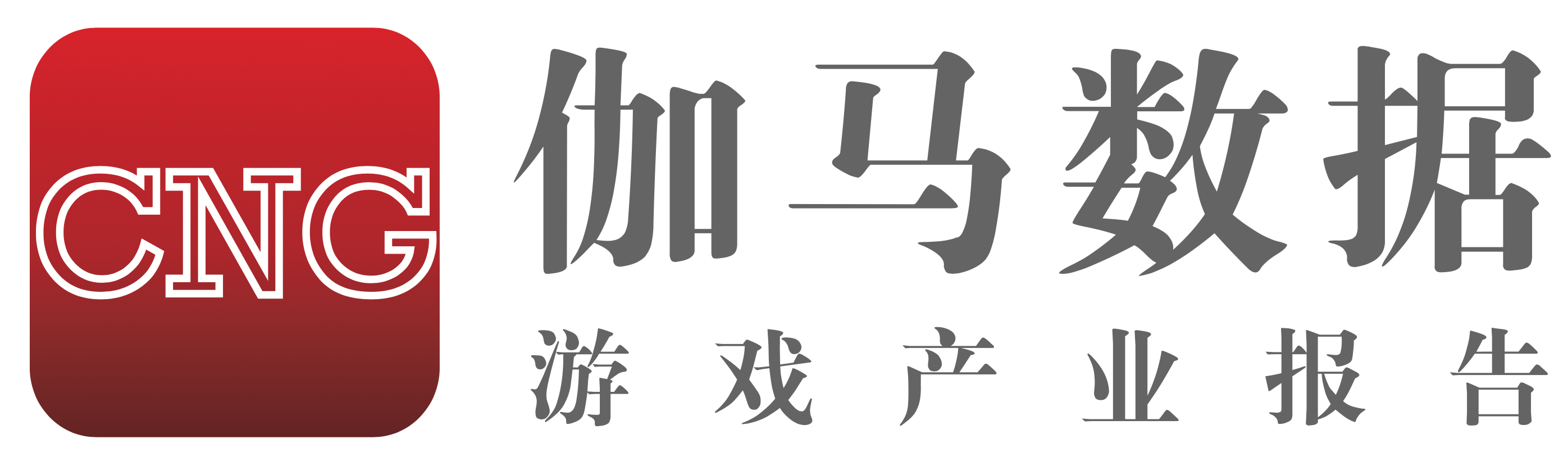
- Native name: 伽马数据
- Type: Private
- Industry: Research
- Headquarters: Beijing, China
- Products: Research; Consulting; Events
- Website: http://www.joynews.cn/

Gamma Data (Chinese: 伽马数据; pinyin: jiāmǎ shùjù; also referred to as CNG or CNG New Game Research) is a Chinese research institute which focuses on analytics for video games, movies and television programmes. The "China Videogame Industry Report", presented by Gamma Data with guidance from the State Administration of Radio, Film and Television (SARFT) and sponsorship by the Game Publishers Association Publications Committee (GPC), is the most authoritative report in the Chinese gaming industry. Gamma Data's government-commissioned and nationwide reports, insights, and analytics data results have been regularly showcased at the China Game Industry Annual Conference and ChinaJoy Summit Forum, and its data and views are also extensively quoted in prospectus, listing memorandums and strategy press conferences by a large number of Chinese gaming companies.

== Organisation ==
Gamma Data is the research institute of Gamma New Media & Culture Co., Ltd., which was founded in 2010 in Beijing, China. It focuses on cultural and creative industries, such as the videogame, motion picture and television industries. Gamma Data advises on issues such as project assessment, market analysis, mergers and acquisitions, and investment decisions with respect to its insights within their relevant industries. It provides objective and impartial market research and mass data reflecting the development and characteristics of these industries. The government-commissioned "China Videogame Industry Report", presented by Gamma Data, is the most authoritative report and widely acknowledged in China's videogame industry. Gamma Data also works with the local governments of Shanghai, Guangzhou and Sichuan to co-produce regional market reports.

== Events ==
In June 2017, the Shanghai Game Elite Summit Forum was directed by the Press and Publication Bureau of Shanghai, hosted by Gamma Data, and co-organized by Guotai Junan Securities. In July 2017, The symposium with the theme "Revolution and Integration", was co-hosted by Gamma Data and Haitong Securities. The "2017 Listed Chinese Gaming Company Competitiveness Report (A-share)" was issued at the symposium.

In April 2018, CNG Forum HK2018 was hosted by Gamma Data and co-organized by CITIC Securities and CLSA. As a high-end game symposium and docking enterprise fair, the event was attended by a large number of executives and professionals from gaming companies, global financial institutions, and media companies.
