= List of semi-automatic shotguns =

A semi-automatic shotgun is a form of shotgun that is able to fire a cartridge after every trigger squeeze, without needing to manually chamber another round.

Symbol	SS	PA	LA	SA	FA	BAC	DB	MB	BA	RE
Meaning	Single shot	Pump-action	Lever-action	Semi-automatic	Fully automatic	Break-action	Double-barreled	Multi-barreled	Bolt-action	Revolver

Symbol	SG	CS	DS
Meaning	Shotgun	Combat shotgun	Deer shotgun

Name	Manufacturer	Image	Cartridge	Type	Feed	Country	Year
AAI CAWS	AAI Corporation		12 gauge, 12 Gauge Special	SA; FA; SG	Detachable box magazine	United States	1980s
Akdal MKA 1919	Akdal Arms (Ucyildiz Arms A.Ş.)		12 gauge	SA; SG	Detachable box magazine	Turkey	2006
AK12 Tactical 12/76	Sino Defense Manufactung		12 gauge	SA; SG	Detachable box magazine	China	
Armscor Model 30	Armscor		12 gauge	SA; SG	Tubular magazine	Philippines	
Armsel Striker			12 gauge	SA; SG	Cylinder	South Africa	1981
Atchisson Assault Shotgun	Military Police Systems		12 gauge	SA; FA; SG	Detachable box magazine	United States	1972
Baikal MP-153	Izhevsk Mechanical Plant		12 gauge	SA; SG	Tubular magazine	Russia	2001
Benelli M1 Super 90	Benelli Armi		12 gauge 20 gauge	SA; SG	Tubular magazine	Italy	1994
Benelli M3 Super 90	Benelli Armi		12 gauge 20 gauge	SA; SG	Tubular magazine	Italy	1995
Benelli M1014	Benelli Armi		12 gauge	SA; SG	Tubular magazine	Italy	1999
Benelli Raffaello	Benelli Armi		12 gauge	SA; SG	Tubular magazine	Italy	
Benelli Vinci	Benelli Armi		12 gauge	SA; SG	Tubular magazine	Italy	2009
Beretta 1201FP	Fabbrica d'Armi Pietro Beretta		12 gauge	SA; SG	Tubular magazine	Italy	1980s
Beretta A303	Fabbrica d'Armi Pietro Beretta		12 gauge	SA; SG	Tubular magazine	Italy	
Beretta AL391	Fabbrica d'Armi Pietro Beretta		12 gauge 20 gauge	SA; SG	Tubular magazine	Italy	1999
Beretta Xtrema 2	Fabbrica d'Armi Pietro Beretta		12 gauge	SA; SG	Tubular magazine	Italy	2004
Browning Auto-5	FN Herstal		12 gauge 16 gauge 20 gauge	SA; SG	Tubular magazine	United States; Belgium	1898
Browning Double Automatic Shotgun	Browning Arms Company; FN Herstal		12 gauge	SA; SG	Single loading port	United States	1955
Cosmi Shotgun	Cosmi Americo & Figlio		12 gauge 16 gauge 20 gauge 28 gauge.410 bore		Tubular magazine	Italy	1925
Derya MK Derya VR-60; Derya VR-90; Derya Bullpup N-100	Derya Arms		12 gauge 20 gauge	SA; SG	Detachable box magazine	Turkey	
ENARM Pentagun	ENARM		12 gauge	SA; SG	Cylinder	Brazil	
FN SLP	FN Herstal		12 gauge	SA; SG	Tubular magazine	Belgium	2008
Franchi AL-48	Luigi Franchi S.p.A.		20 gauge 28 gauge	SA; SG	Tubular magazine	Italy	
Franchi mod .410	Luigi Franchi S.p.A.		.410 bore	FA; CS	Detachable box magazine	Italy	
Franchi Special Purpose Shotgun 12	Luigi Franchi S.p.A.		12 gauge	SA; SG	Tubular magazine	Italy	1972
Franchi SPAS-15	Luigi Franchi S.p.A.		12 gauge	SA; SG	Detachable box magazine	Italy	1986
Escort BTS Escort DF Escort PX Escort SD Escort VX12	HATSAN		12 gauge.410 bore	SA; SG	Detachable box magazine	Turkey	
GEN-12	Taran Tactical		12 gauge	SA; FA	Detachable box magazine	United States	2024
Heckler & Koch HK CAWS	Heckler & Koch		12 gauge	SA; FA; SG	Detachable box magazine	West Germany	1980s
Heckler & Koch HK512	Heckler & Koch		12 gauge	SA	7 round tubular	Germany; Italy	1970s
High Standard Model 10	High Standard Manufacturing Company		12 gauge	SA; SG	Tubular magazine	United States	1950s
Ithaca Mag-10	Ithaca Gun Company		10 gauge	SA; SG	Tubular magazine	United States	1975
K12 PUMA	Norinco		12 gauge	SA; SG	Detachable box magazine	China	
M12	JTS Group		12 gauge	SA; SG	Detachable box magazine	United States	
Loughridge Imiru	Bill Loughridge, Cylinder & Slide NB		12 gauge 16 gauge 20 gauge 28 gauge.410 bore	SA; SG	Tubular magazine	United States	1982
MAUL (shotgun)	Metal Storm		12 gauge	SA; SG	Preloaded tube	Australia	
Mossberg 930	O.F. Mossberg & Sons		12 gauge	SA; SG	Tubular magazine	United States	2000s
MTs 21-12	TsKIB SOO		12 gauge	SA; SG	Tubular magazine	Soviet Union	1965
Origin-12	Fostech Outdoors		12 gauge	SA; SG	Detachable box magazine	United States	2013
Pancor Jackhammer	Pancor Corporation		12 gauge	FA; SG	Detachable cylinder	United States	1984
Parker Hale Rogun			12 gauge	SA; SG	Tubular magazine	United Kingdom	
Pindad SG1	PT Pindad		12 gauge	SA CS	Tubular magazine	Indonesia	2003
QBS-09	NORINCO		12 gauge	SA; SG	Tubular magazine	China	2005
RAS-12	Intrepid Tactical Solutions		12 gauge	SA	Detachable box magazine	United States	2010s
Remington Model 11	Remington Arms Company		12 gauge 16 gauge 20 gauge	SA; SG	Tubular magazine	United States	1898
Remington Model 11-48	Remington Arms Company		12 gauge 16 gauge 20 gauge 28 gauge.410 bore	SA; SG	Tubular magazine	United States	1948
Remington 11-87	Remington Arms Company		12 gauge 20 gauge	SA; SG	Tubular magazine	United States	1987
Remington Model 58	Remington Arms Company		12 gauge 16 gauge 20 gauge	SA; SG	Tubular magazine	United States	1956
Remington Model 878	Remington Arms Company		12 gauge	SA; SG	Tubular magazine	United States	1959
Remington Model 1100	Remington Arms Company		12 gauge 16 gauge 20 gauge 28 gauge.410 bore	SA; SG	Tubular magazine	United States	1963
Remington Model SP-10	Remington Arms Company		10 gauge	SA; SG	Tubular magazine	United States	1989
Remington Spartan 453	Izhevsk Mechanical Plant		12 gauge	SA; SG	Tubular magazine	Russia	1999
RS-S1	Armsan Silah Sanayi ve Ticaret A.Ş.		12 gauge	SA; SG	Detachable box magazine	Turkey	
Safir T-14	Safir Arms		.410 bore	SA; SG	Detachable box magazine	Turkey	
Saiga-12	Izhmash		12 gauge 20 gauge.410 bore	SA; SG	Detachable box magazine	Russia	1990s
Sjögren shotgun	AB Svenska Vapen- och Ammunitionsfabriken		12 gauge	SA; SG	Tubular magazine	Sweden	1908
Smith & Wesson AS	Smith & Wesson		12 gauge	SA; FA; SG	Detachable box magazine	United States	1980s
SRM 1216	SRM Arms		12 gauge	SA; SG	Detachable 4-tube revolver magazine	United States	2010
Tavor TS12	Israel Weapon Industries		12 gauge	SA; SG	3 magazine tubes	Israel	2018
TOZ-87	TsKIB SOO and Tula Arms Plant		12 gauge	SA; SG	Tubular magazine	Soviet Union	1987
TR-100 TR-12; TR-47; UNG-12	UZKON		12 gauge	SA; SG	Detachable box magazine	Turkey	
Typhoon; Sierra 12	Typhoon Defence Industries		12 gauge 20 gauge	SA; SG	Detachable box magazine Detachable drum magazine	Turkey	
USAS-12	Daewoo Precision Industries		12 gauge	SA; FA; SG	Detachable box magazine	South Korea	1980s
UTAS XTR-12	UTAS Defence		12 gauge	SA; SG	Detachable box magazine	Turkey	2017
Vepr-12	Vyatskiye Polyany Machine-Building Plant		7.62×39mm 12 gauge	SA; SG	Detachable box magazine	Russia	2003
Walther interbellum semi-automatic	Walther		12 gauge 16 gauge 20 gauge	SA; SG	Tubular magazine	Germany	1918
Weatherby SA-08	Weatherby		12 gauge 20 gauge	SA; SG	Tubular magazine	United States	

== See also ==
- List of firearms
- List of assault rifles
- List of bullpup firearms
- List of machine guns
- List of multiple-barrel firearms
- List of pistols
- List of revolvers
- List of semi-automatic firearms
  - List of semi-automatic pistols
  - List of semi-automatic rifles
- List of shotguns
- List of sniper rifles
- List of submachine guns
