= Beretta A303 =

Semi-automatic shotgun

Beretta A300
- Type: Semi-automatic shotgun
- Place of origin: Italy

Production history
- Manufacturer: Fabbrica d'Armi Pietro Beretta

Specifications
- Mass: 3.15 kg
- Length: Variable (depends on barrel)
- Caliber: 12-gauge
- Action: Gas-operated reloading

The Beretta A303 is a semi-automatic shotgun, developed by the Italian arms manufacturing company Fabbrica d'Armi Pietro Beretta.

The Beretta A300 is a gas-operated Semi-automatic shotgun developed in 1965 by Italy's Pietro Beretta and released commercially starting in 1968. Although the model name changed several times over its sales period, the original A300 was characterized by a self-regulating gas piston and its 12-gauge caliber.

== Overview ==
=== Background ===
During World War II, Pietro Beretta supplied firearms such as the Carcano M1891 and Carcano M1938 to the Kingdom of Italy's national military, and also exported them to the Empire of Japan as the Type I rifle. After the Italian surrender in 1943 and subsequent seizure by Nazi Germany and the Italian Social Republic, World War II ended in 1945 with the defeat of the Axis powers. Under the Italian Republic, which was strongly influenced by the Allies, particularly the United States, Beretta resumed production of civilian firearms and also undertook maintenance of U.S.-made weapons supplied to the Italian military.

In 1959, Beretta independently developed the Beretta BM59 automatic rifle, based on the M1 Garand. Several years prior, they had also begun developing a semi-automatic shotgun, drawing inspiration from the M1 Garand's long-stroke piston gas system. In 1956, they released their first gas-operated shotgun, the Beretta M60.

The M60's basic layout, featuring a easily disassembled takedown barrel and a tube magazine parallel to the barrel, was similar to the Remington Model 58 (predecessor to the Remington 1100). However, its gas piston design differed significantly. Unlike the Model 58, which housed its piston at the front of the magazine tube, or the Model 1100, which used a cylindrical piston around the magazine tube, the M60 adopted a structure that closely followed the M1 Garand's system: a small gas cylinder was placed between the barrel and magazine tube, with a long piston rod extending back towards the action.

The M60 was improved in 1961 and continued to be sold as the Beretta M61. However, it had a drawback: it was prone to malfunctions with Shotgun shells containing less than 34 grams of shot. Aiming to create a semi-automatic shotgun that would function reliably even with lighter loads, development began in 1965 on what would become the Beretta A300.

=== Introduction of the A300 ===
In 1968, Beretta officially added the new Beretta A300 semi-automatic shotgun to its sales catalog. Besides featuring an aluminum alloy receiver and a chrome-molybdenum steel barrel, the A300 newly adopted a short-stroke gas piston system. The gas piston was located at the front of the magazine tube and transmitted driving force via an action bar linked to the bolt. Its key features were reliable operation with both heavy hunting loads and light target loads in the 2.75-inch chamber without any adjustment, and a self-cleaning action. The latter was achieved by having a piston with circumferential cutouts reciprocating within a cylindrical gas port on the barrel, which automatically expelled residue from unburned powder gases accumulated in the cylinder. This significantly reduced the need for the shooter to clean the gas piston after every shooting session.

The A300 became a worldwide hit upon release. From 1971 onwards, 20-gauge models and models chambered for 3-inch Magnum shells were added, and export to North America, the world's largest firearm market, began through the U.S. firm Garcia Sporting Arms as the Garcia-Beretta AL series.

Beretta also actively pursued licensed production agreements for the A300. For the Japanese market, through a technology transfer agreement with Kawaguchiya Rin Jūyaku K.K. (KFC), Singer Nippon began licensed production, with sales starting in 1972 under the name KFC Gas Auto. For the North American market, besides the Garcia export route, a technology transfer agreement was also made with Browning Arms. Browning had the A302 produced under license by FN Herstal in Belgium and sold it as the Browning B-80 from 1981 to 1988. Italy's Breda Meccanica Bresciana also manufactured the Breda Altair Lusso, a licensed version of the A300, from the 1980s to the 1990s.

KFC, Browning, and Breda did not simply replicate the A300 but made their own specification changes for their existing customer bases. The KFC Gas Auto was characterized by its use of externally interchangeable choke barrels, a feature carried over from its predecessor, the KFC Auto (a licensed Browning Auto-5). The Breda Altair Lusso, from which the KFC version was derived, could also use the Quick Choke system employed by previous Breda semi-automatic shotguns. The original A300 series itself did not adopt internal interchangeable chokes until the Beretta A302 appeared in 1980. Furthermore, the Browning B-80 featured a steel receiver and a distinct humpback design with a sharply angled rear end, appealing to the company's Auto-5 user base. The KFC Gas Auto was marked "UNDER LICENCE OF BERETTA" on the left side of the receiver, while the Browning B-80 had "Patent (PB) Italy 3420140" engraved on its barrel, clearly indicating their status as licensed A300 productions.

=== Success in the United States ===
Due to its design where the gas piston is attached to the front of the magazine tube, extending the magazine tube necessarily requires barrel replacement, making increasing the maximum shell capacity difficult. Therefore, the A300 was not necessarily ideal for defensive use, a significant market demand in the United States.

However, unlike contemporary competitors with similar structures like the S&W M1000 or Browning B-2000, the A300 was widely accepted in the U.S. as a hunting shotgun. American firearms researcher Randy Wakeman attributes this success to the A300's resistance to fouling.

Although the Beretta A300's gas piston is mounted on the magazine tube end, unlike the S&W M1000 or B-2000, the magazine tube itself is not used as the cylinder. Instead, the barrel ring (Note: A component inserted into the magazine tube to prevent the barrel itself from rotating. In gas-operated shotguns, the gas port is often located within the barrel ring.) brazed to the barrel serves as the cylinder. The gas piston exposes itself from the barrel ring with each recoil stroke, releasing propellant gas from its entire circumference. This made the area inside the fore-end very prone to fouling, but unlike the S&W M1000 or B-2000, it did not require frequent cleaning of the gas piston or cylinder. When cleaning was necessary, it could be done easily just by scrubbing with a bore brush.

Furthermore, firearms using a magazine tube as the cylinder, like the S&W M1000 and B-2000, sometimes experienced malfunctions due to incorrect reassembly of the gas piston. The A300's gas piston, however, had a flange on one side, making incorrect assembly structurally impossible. Beretta's advertising even highlighted this, boasting a "simple, foolproof design with no O-ring failures (like the Remington 1100) and no need for complex field stripping for cleaning (like the S&W M1000 or B-2000)".

The A300's gas regulation system was not as comprehensive as those on the S&W M1000 or B-2000. A risk of malfunction still existed with very light loads under 28 grams. (Note: In the U.S., shot weight is typically denoted in ounces rather than grams. For 12-gauge, 1 ounce (28g) is commonly the lightest load available; the 7/8 ounce (24g) common in Japan is less prevalent.) Also, using more powerful shells resulted in faster, more forceful bolt cycling. However, American shooters tended to value robustness that could withstand rough handling and harsh conditions, along with high tolerance to fouling even for negligent owners, over intricate mechanisms like sophisticated gas regulation. Because the A300's design aligned with these American preferences, it avoided the early discontinuation fate of the S&W M1000 and B-2000, becoming a long-selling model for over 20 years.

=== Model Changes ===
The A300 underwent several minor changes: the Beretta A301 in 1971, the Beretta A302 in 1980, and the Beretta A303 in 1985. A full model change occurred in 1992, transitioning to the Beretta AL390 series.

Initially, the AL390 series only included the 2 3/4-inch chamber model, designated Beretta A304. The 3-inch chamber Beretta A390 was added in 1994, followed in 1996 by the Beretta AL390, which used some lightweight parts from the A390. The AL390 series barrels were not compatible with the A300-A303 series, preventing interchangeability.

The AL390 series itself was succeeded by the Beretta AL391 in 1999.

=== Revival of the Nameplate ===
In 2016, Beretta released a new model called the Beretta A300 Outlander, effectively "reviving" the A300 name.

The A300 Outlander is positioned as a budget-friendly version of Beretta's flagship semi-automatic shotgun series, the Beretta A400, introduced in 2008. Similar to competing models released around the same time, like the Browning Maxus and Benelli Vinci, it achieved a more accessible price point by omitting some of the high-performance (but costly) features aimed at "low recoil, high rate of fire" that the A400 pursued. It is not compatible with the original A300 series.

== Model Variations ==
Beretta A300
The initial model from 1965-1971. After the 12-gauge model transitioned to the A301 in 1971 (with the addition of 20-gauge and 3-inch Magnum models that year), the 12-gauge A300 continued to be sold until 1979.

Garcia-Beretta AL
Circa 1971-1976. AL is an acronym for AutoLoader. The base model equivalent to the A300 was sold as the AL-1, while the higher-end model equivalent to the A301, featuring an engraved receiver and vent-rib barrel, was sold as the AL-2. In 1975, all models were sold as the AL-3, but after Garcia's bankruptcy in 1976, Beretta A300/A301 models were exported directly.

Beretta A301
1971-1980. Featured strengthened barrel steel and the addition of vent-rib barrels to the lineup.
Beretta A302
1980-1985. A generation with major design changes. Standard and Magnum models, which previously had different receivers, now shared a common receiver. It incorporated a magazine cut-off mechanism and a new action that allowed shells in the magazine to be unloaded simply by pressing the bolt release button. The barrel rib was also changed to a floating type.
Beretta A303
1985-1992. A minor change version of the A302. The trigger mechanism was further simplified for easier disassembly.
