= Remington Model 878 =

- Type: Semi-automatic shotgun
- Place of origin: United States

Production history
- Designer: L. Ray Critendon, Ellis Hailston, and Harold L. Hameister
- Designed: c.1959
- Manufacturer: Remington Arms
- Unit cost: $159.50 (MSRP)
- Produced: 1959–1963
- No. built: ~63,500

Specifications
- Mass: ~7 pounds (3.2 kg)
- Barrel length: 28 or 30 inches (71 or 76 cm)
- Cartridge: 12 gauge
- Action: Semi-automatic gas operated
- Feed system: 2+1 round tube magazine
- Sights: Bead front; plain or vent rib barrel

The Remington Model 878, also known as the 878 Automaster, is a gas-operated semi-automatic shotgun made by Remington Arms from 1959 to 1963. The Model 878 was based on the company's previously introduced Model 58, both of which were succeeded by the Model 1100.

== Design ==
The predecessor to the Model 878, the Model 58, was a new semi-automatic design for Remington, being a gas operated system rather than the long recoil operation system designed by John Browning and used in the famous Browning Auto-5 and Remington Model 11 and Model 11-48.

The Model 878 introduced an improved "self-adjusting" gas system, a notable improvement over the Model 58, which required the gas system to be manually adjusted for different types of ammunition. Barring this and cosmetic differences, the Model 58 and Model 878 are virtually the same, with both models essentially being gas operated versions of Remington's pump action Model 870.

The gas system on the Model 878 utilizes a gas piston, which operates by tapping combustion gases from two gas ports in the barrel ring and directing the gases down into the piston, housed in the magazine cylinder. Rearward motion of the gas piston actuates the action bar which also moves rearward to open the bolt, allowing the spent shell to be ejected while moving a new cartridge from the magazine tube into the receiver. To complete the cycling of the action, the piston return spring moves the piston and the action bar forward, closing the bolt and moving the cartridge into the chamber. The gas system design found on the Model 878 (and other shotguns such as the Winchester Model 1400) has a notable disadvantage. Housing the gas piston and piston return spring inside the magazine cylinder effectively reduces the capacity of a tube magazine of a given size when compared to other gas or manually operated systems.

The shortcoming in the design of the gas system on the Model 878 was addressed with an updated gas system found on Remington's Model 1100, making both the Model 878 and any other shotguns using a similar design technically obsolete.
