= Browning Double Automatic Shotgun =

Browning Double Automatic (BDAS)
- Type: Shotgun
- Place of origin: United States/Belgium

Production history
- Designer: Val A. Browning
- Manufacturer: Browning Arms; Fabrique Nationale
- Produced: 1955–1971

Specifications
- Mass: 7 lbs 11 oz (standard); 6 lbs 14 oz (twelvette); 6 lbs (twentyweight)
- Caliber: 12 gauge
- Action: Semi-automatic
- Feed system: One shell chambered plus one shell in loading port

The Browning Double Automatic Shotgun / B-DAS is a short-recoil operated semi-automatic (auto-loading) 12-gauge shotgun with a 2 3/4-inch chamber. The firearm was produced between 1952 and 1971, with production volume of approximately 67,000. Production date amended from 1955 to 1952 according to direct information from manufacturer.

== Description ==
All Double Automatic shotguns are 12 gauge. Various configurations were available for choke, barrel length, and barrel type.

The Double Automatic was offered in both aluminum and steel receiver configurations, with the aluminum receivers featuring a variety of finish colors. The three versions offered include the Standard as the only steel receiver version, while Twelvette and Twentyweight used an aluminum receiver.

=== Action ===
This firearm features a unique loading port on the left side of the receiver. As the first round is loaded, the shell is lifted by a mechanism and chambered by the bolt; once the bolt is closed, the lifting mechanism returns to the resting position below the loading port, where the next round can then be loaded. Upon firing the chambered round, the shell in the loading port is automatically chambered. The total capacity is two shells: one chambered round and one round in the loading port.

=== Markings ===
The Double Automatic shotgun has engravings on the left-rear of the barrel. Chokes are designated as:

* Full choke, *- Improved Modified, ** Modified, **- Improved cylinder, **$ skeet, *** full bore

== See also ==
- List of semi-automatic shotguns
