= Beretta 1301 =

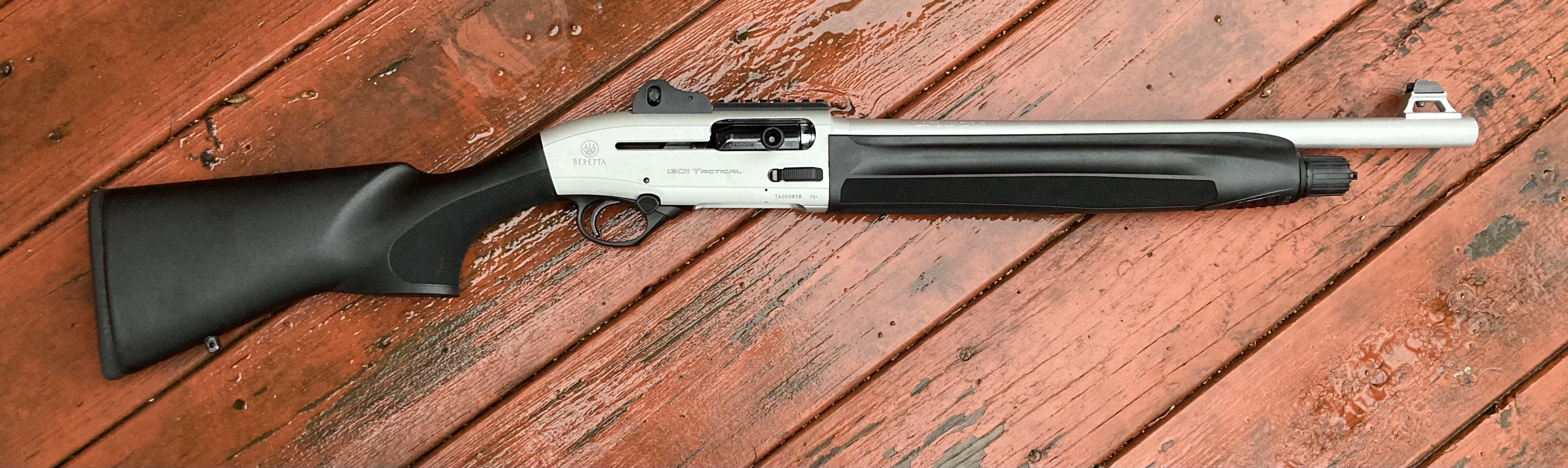
- Beretta 1301 Tactical Marine
- Type: Semi-automatic shotgun
- Place of origin: Italy

Production history
- Manufacturer: Beretta
- Developed from: Beretta Tx4 Storm Beretta A400
- Produced: 2014-Present

Specifications
- Mass: Tactical: 6.35 pounds (2.88 kg) Tactical Mod2: 6.7 pounds (3.0 kg) Competition 21": 6.7 pounds (3.0 kg) Competition 24": 7.1 pounds (3.2 kg)
- Length: 37.8 inches (96 cm)
- Cartridge: 2.75" (70mm) or 3" (76mm)
- Caliber: 12-gauge
- Action: Semi-automatic, auto-regulating annular short-stroke gas piston, rotating bolt
- Feed system: Tube Magazine

The Beretta 1301 is a gas-operated semi-automatic shotgun produced by Beretta, and imported by Beretta USA in the United States. The firearm has two distinct models: The 1301 Tactical is intended for tactical self-defense and law enforcement applications whereas the 1301 Competition is designed for practical shooting sports such as Multigun or IPSC Shotgun. Despite its intended applications, it is often used by a minority of hunters and clay pigeon shooters.

The A400-based 1301 is a successor to the earlier, less successful Tx4 Storm, and it shares many similarities with Beretta's A400 line of shotguns, which are successors to the A391 series.

All modern 1301 shotguns, much like their A400 counterparts, make use of a Beretta proprietary choke constriction system known as "Optimachoke-HP". One exception is the LE model and the early Tactical model, which used a fixed cylinder barrel without constrictions. All 1301 barrels are backbored to .732" for reduced muzzle rise and improved patterning. In order to achieve a higher capacity, the 1301 employs the annular gas system (AGS) found on the A400 Xtreme, where the gas piston rides outside of the magazine tube instead of at the end of the tube like the regular A400s, allowing for a longer magazine tube to pass through the gas system.

== Models ==
=== 1301 Tactical (2014) ===
The Beretta 1301 Tactical, the successor to the Tx4 Storm, began production in Italy in 2014. The Tx4 Storm received poor sales due to its relatively high price tag. As a result, the 1301 employed various cost-saving measures such as changing the rear sights and Picatinny rail from machined metal to polymer, and the removal of rubberized grips found on the forend and grip lifted from the earlier A391 Xtrema 2. Main improvements from the Tx4 Storm includes an enlarged polymer charging handle and an oversized bolt release lever, which doubles as a magazine ejection button when pressed on the rear side or lifted up from the front. It is often viewed as a competitor to the Benelli M4 despite being priced similarly to the cheaper Benelli M2.

As of 2024, there are three main Tactical variants: 1301 Tactical (Gen 2 Enhanced), 1301 Tactical LE, and 1301 Tactical Mod.2. Each model comes standard with a traditional "field" stock but can be purchased with a Mesa Tactical Urbino pistol grip stock from the factory. The 1301 Tactical currently has three factory colors: Black, Flat Dark Earth, and Olive Green Drab. A fourth color, Marine, was previously available but discontinued due to the weaker silver finish wearing off quickly. The Mod.2 is additionally available in grey.

=== 1301 Tactical Gen 2 (2018) ===
Numerous improvements were made to the 1301 Tactical after collecting user feedbacks. The most visible change is the bolt release lever: Since the rear portion of the lever doubles as a magazine ejection button, accidentally hitting the rear portion or lifting the lever could cause it to double feed. Beretta addressed this issue by shaving the rear of the lever on the new generation 1301 Tactical and reprofiled the lever, now requiring the user to deliberately lift it up in order to eject rounds from the magazine tube. Since rapid clearing is a favorable feature in competition shooting, the 1301 Competition Gen 2 did not receive the revised lever. At the same time, Beretta released a bolt release shroud for Gen 1 owners to retrofit onto their shotguns, blocking the rear half of the button thus reducing accidental magazine ejections.

The Gen 2 also comes with threaded, interchangeable chokes as standard, whereas earlier Gen 1 models have a fixed cylinder bore. The polymer top rail was changed to aluminum to improve its durability and precision when heavier optics are mounted.

=== 1301 Tactical LE (2021) ===
The 1301 Tactical LE features a fixed cylinder or improved cylinder choke instead of the interchangeable Optimachoke-HP chokes. All 1301 Tactical LE came with a 7-round extended magazine tube and the Gen 2 bolt release lever as standard, whereas regular Tactical models can be found without the magazine extension and only holds 5 rounds. The longer magazine tube is covered by a polymer nose cap, with the extended portion secured to the barrel via a barrel clamp. The barrel clamp features a pair of integrated QD sling mounts. It can be ordered with a Mesa Tactical Urbino pistol grip stock from the factory.

=== 1301 Tactical Gen 2 Enhanced (2021) ===
The Gen 2 Enhanced is Beretta's current offering. It features an integral 7-round magazine tube lifted from the LE model in applicable regions. It can be ordered with a Mesa Tactical Urbino pistol grip stock from the factory.

=== 1301 Tactical Mod.2 (2024) ===
The 1301 Tactical Mod.2 is Beretta's flagship tactical shotgun, with various improvements compared to the Gen 2 Enhanced. It features an updated forend with M-Lok slots found on the A300 Ultima Patrol, a semi-flat competition trigger, and the Pro Elevator, which automatically moves the shell lifter up once the bolt closes, greatly improving the reloading experience. It can be ordered with a Mesa Tactical Urbino pistol grip stock or a Chisel Machining adjustable pistol grip stock from the factory.

=== 1301 Competition (2014) ===
The Beretta 1301 Competition is designed for competitive shooting disciplines, most frequently 3-gun competitive shooting. The shotgun makes use of a traditional bead sight system and boasts a longer 21" or 24" barrel, conducive to shooting targets at greater distances while being more maneuverable than a full-length (28"+) hunting shotgun. In order to better facilitate reloading, the 1301 Competition is built on the A400 Xtreme receiver featuring longer loading and ejection ports, as the A400 Xtreme is designed for the longer 3.5" shells. As a result, A400 Xtreme barrels are cross-compatible with 1301 Competition barrels. However, the Competition cannot fire 3.5" shells as its chamber was only cut to 3" depth, and its receiver was also only proofed for 3" shells' pressure.

=== 1301 Competition Gen 2 (2018) ===
Like the Tactical, the Competition received a facelift in 2018 with numerous small improvements. The most visible change is the location of the serial number, it has been moved from the front of the loading port and under the bolt release lever to the rear of the loading port, in front of the safety button. This enables competition shooters and gunsmiths to enlarge the loading port beyond the factory opening without defacing the serials. For shooters that do not wish to void their warranties, the Gen 2 already featured an enlarged loading port from the factory. The lifter has also been extended to improve feeding reliability.

=== 1301 Comp Pro (2019) ===
The 1301 Comp Pro is Beretta's flagship competition shotgun, a further improvement on the Competition Gen 2. Similar to the clay pigeon shooting focused A400 Xcel, the 1301 Comp Pro features a distinct, blue finish on the receiver. It comes with a 10-round magazine from the factory for applicable markets. To speed up reloading and eliminate thumb bite on the spring-loaded lifter, the Comp Pro features Beretta's Pro Elevator, an updated lifter design that stays open when the bolt is dropped. The shooter no longer needs to hold the lifter open to reload the tube, drastically improving ergonomics.

Another major upgrade is a new polymer stock with the Kick-Off Plus system previously found on Beretta's A400 lineup. It consists of two elastomer dampeners complete with return springs, positioned near the rubber insert, which effectively mitigate the first recoil peak reducing the perceived recoil by up to 40%. A third elastomer dampener, located in the stock bolt, absorbs the impact of the slide against the stock, thus reducing the second recoil peak, muzzle jump, and any vibrations caused by the movement of the slide. The B-Steady system divides the stock into two sections: Butt and forearm. The recoil absorption point is in front of the cheek weld, moving in unison with the forearm. This leaves the rear portion of the stock stable and avoiding any annoying rubbing of the comb against the cheek, a common complaint on the earlier Kick-Off system featured on the A391 series and available to other field stock 1301 models as an add-on.

=== Langdon Tactical LTT 1301 ===
Langdon Tactical Technologies of Gilbert, Arizona makes the LTT 1301 Tactical Shotgun, a Title 18 USC 922r–compliant variant using a Gen 2 Beretta 1301 barreled action, fitted with a modified Magpul "Zhukov" aftermarket handguard that offers M-LOK rail mount options, a Magpul SGA buttstock for Mossberg 500/590 with an Aridus ASA-1301 Adapter, QDC sling mounting point options and a seven-round tubular magazine. There are also the options to add an Aridus Universal Q-DC sidesaddle shell holder and an Aridus CROM (Co-witness Ready Optic Mount) for Trijicon RMR or Aimpoint Micro series red dot sights.

== Characteristics ==
All Beretta 1301 shotguns use cold-hammer-forged barrels with chrome-lining. The receiver/frame are made from aluminum with an anodized finish. The stock and forearm are made from polymer, with a rubberized recoil pad fastened to the rear of the stock.

=== General features ===
- All Beretta 1301 shotguns use durable cold-hammer-forged barrels with corrosion-resistant chrome lining.
- The lightweight aluminum receivers have a scratch-resistant anodized finish.
- Synthetic stocks and forearms provide a comfortable grip and withstand harsh weather conditions.
- A rubberized recoil pad absorbs shock for improved comfort during shooting.

=== Barrel and chamber ===
- Barrel lengths vary depending on the model, with options suitable for different applications. Tactical models feature 18.7" barrels while Competition models feature 21" and 24" barrels.
- All barrels have chambers that can accommodate 2.75" and 3" shotgun shells, the standard size for most sporting and self-defense purposes.
- The Competition receiver is based on the longer A400 Xtreme (designed for 3.5" shells), as a result it features a longer loading port to better facilitate reloading. However, only 3" shells are allowed in the Competition, as the barrel was only chambered for 3" shells. A400 Xtreme barrels chambered in 3.5" are compatible with the 1301 Competition receiver, but the receiver itself was not proofed to 3.5" shells' pressure.

=== Magazine capacity and limitations ===
- Base magazine capacity varies depending on model and regulations. In some countries, models can have magazine extensions for increased capacity.
- The 1301 ships with two removable plastic restrictors to reduce the magazine capacity to either two or three rounds in order to conform to various hunting regulations. All 1301s ship with the two-round restrictors pre-installed in the magazine.
- Consumers can install aftermarket magazine tubes for increased capacity in countries where regulations allow.
- The lifter can be manipulated in order to load one extra round between the bolt and lifter, this practice is known as "ghost loading" and is common among competition shooters.

== Users ==
- Alabama Department of Public Safety - Beretta 1301 Tactical, 657 units
- Pennsylvania Game Commission - Beretta 1301 Tactical, 250 units
- Internal Revenue Service $463,000 purchase of Beretta 1301 shotguns
