= UTAS (disambiguation) =

UTAS is the acronym of the University of Tasmania.

UTAS or Utas may also refer to:

- University of Technology and Applied Sciences, a public university in Oman
- UTC Aerospace Systems, a defunct supplier of aerospace and defense products
- UTAŞ Defense, a Turkish defense company or one of its products
  - UTAS UTS-15, a pump-action shotgun
  - UTAS XTR-12, a semi-automatic shotgun
- Bo Utas, a Swedish academic
