= LF-58 =

Gas operated selective fire carbine

The Franchi LF-58 is a gas operated, selective fire carbine that was the product of Italian domestic arms design after the Second World War and during the 1950s.

== Development ==
Following the end of the Second World War, the Italian Armed Forces were equipped with weapons donated and/or sold to them by the United States of America, such as the M1 Garand, as their main service rifle. However, as there were other militaries beginning to develop assault rifles and modern battle rifles, both with larger magazine capacities and increased volumes of fire, the Italians naturally pushed for a more modern service weapon. The M1 Carbine was well-liked among various Italian military circles and the development of the German StG-44 assault rifle chambered in the intermediate 7.92x33mm Kurz cartridge had already given several militaries notice. The Italians decided to design a select-fire weapon chambered in the American .30 Carbine round, being close enough to an intermediate cartridge and easier to acquire than others at the time. Two large Italian arms firms, Pierto Beretta and Luigi Franchi, then began experimental work on improved automatic carbines chambered in the American .30 Carbine cartridge. Despite NATO announcing standardization towards the 7.62x51mm NATO cartridge, the firms continued development under the belief that it would take some time for the NATO cartridge to come into widespread use. Both firms developed service rifles to adhere to NATO's standards. Both designs were finished in 1958, resulting in the Beretta Model 57 and the Franchi LF-58 (which was not publicized). Both designs saw limited production and neither official adoption nor commercial success. The Italian Armed Forces then replaced the M1 Garand with the BM-59 battle rifle in 7.62×51mm NATO and the LF-57 submachine gun chambered in 9×19mm Parabellum.
