= Walther automatic shotgun =

- Type: Semi-automatic shotgun
- Place of origin: Weimar Republic

Production history
- Designed: 1918
- Manufacturer: Walther
- Produced: 1921–1931
- No. built: Estimated 5,000 - 6,000

Specifications
- Barrel length: 27.5 inches (70 centimeters)
- Cartridge: 12 gauge, 16 gauge
- Action: Semi-automatic
- Feed system: 4-round tubular magazine (or 5 rounds with 63.5mm shells)
- Sights: Iron sights

The Walther automatic shotgun is a German self-loading shotgun that was produced by Walther. It resembles the Browning Auto-5 in design.

== History ==
The shotgun uses designs by Fritz Walther and Georg Walther patented in 1918. Original production was handled by Deutsche Werke in the early 1920s, but was later improved by Walther, with refinements being made to the original design such as the addition of new parts like dust covers and reinforcement ribs. Production is thought to have ended in the 1930s.

== Design ==
The Walther automatic shotgun was a recoil operated, toggle-action design, with the whole rear receiver recoiling back on firing. A toggle joint is seen inside the weapon connected to the bolt. A switch on the left side of the weapon can be toggled to drop the handguard which acts as the magazine tube; the magazine tube holds four shells. A bolt release button can be found on the underside of the receiver just behind the handguard.

Due to poor material quality and design issues, the Walther automatic shotgun suffers from reliability issues and parts breakage.

== Operation ==
Recoil from firing a shell causes the receiver and barrel to move backwards compressing the recoil spring, as the recoil spring pushes forward a flap holds the toggle linkage in place, unlocking the bolt and pulling it backwards, a second spring pushes the bolt back into battery.
