= Franchi AL-48 =

Franchi 48 AL
- Type: Shotgun

Specifications
- Mass: 5.4 to 5.7 lbs
- Length: 42.75 to 48 inches
- Barrel length: 24 to 28 inches
- Caliber: 12 gauge, 20 gauge, 28 gauge
- Action: semi-automatic
- Feed system: 4+1 capacity tubular magazine

The 48 AL is a semi-automatic shotgun that has been manufactured by Luigi Franchi S.p.A. since 1948.

The gun is available in 12 gauge, 20 gauge and 28 gauge. It uses a patented action that John Browning developed for the Browning Auto-5. Rounds are cycled through long recoil. Factory models are equipped with walnut stocks and forends. Franchi offers one model with a short stock, and one model with a “Prince-of-Wales” stock.

The 48 AL comes with a light but durable full aluminum receiver that is polished in black, walnut furniture, and a golden trigger.
