= Remington Model 11-48 =

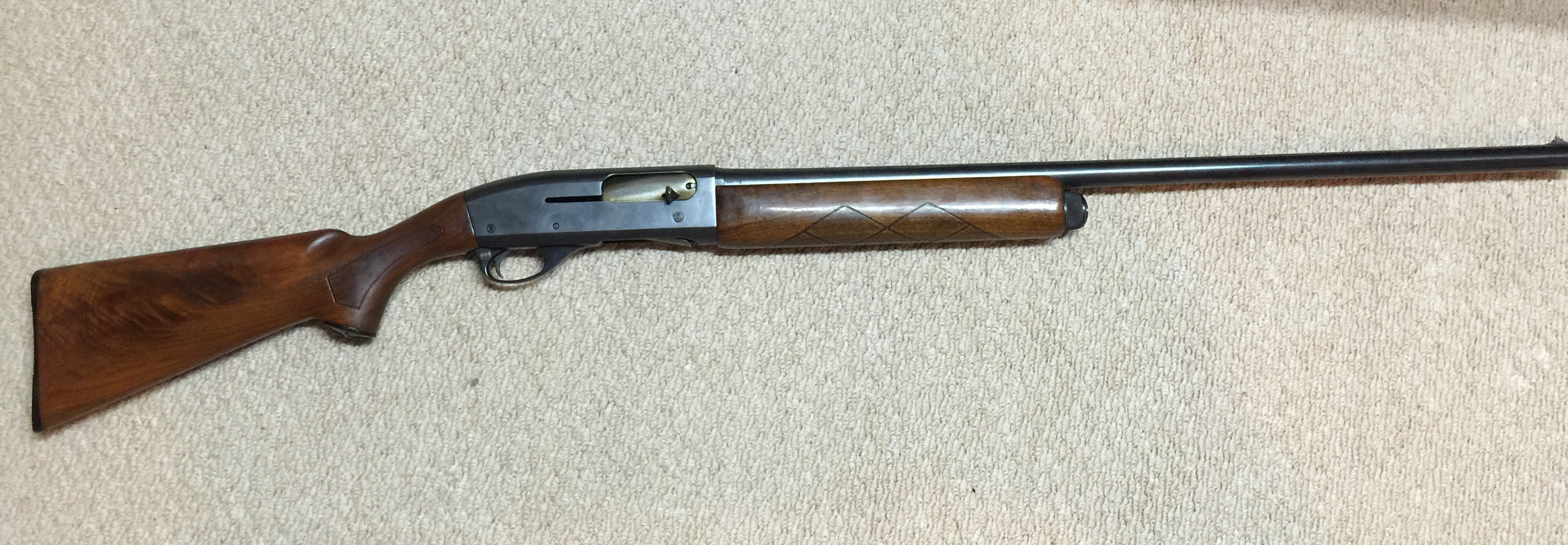
- Type: Semi-automatic shotgun
- Place of origin: United States

Service history
- Used by: United States
- Wars: Korean War, Vietnam War

Production history
- Designer: L. Ray Critendon, Ellis Hailston, and C.R. Johnson
- Designed: 1948
- Manufacturer: Remington Arms
- Produced: 1948–1968
- No. built: 455,535

Specifications
- Mass: 6.6 to 7.7 pounds (3 to 3.5 kg)
- Length: varies with model
- Barrel length: Up to 30 inches (76 cm)
- Cartridge: 12, 16, 20, or 28 gauge (maximum length 2 3/4 inches), or .410 bore
- Action: Semi-automatic, recoil-operated
- Feed system: Tube magazine 4+1 rounds, or 2+1 rounds on the Sportsman '48
- Sights: Single front bead

The Remington Model 11-48 is a semi-automatic shotgun manufactured by Remington Arms as the first of its "new generation" semi-automatics produced after World War II. Released as the replacement for the Remington Model 11, it was manufactured from 1948 to 1968 and was produced in 12, 16, 20 and 28 gauge and .410 variations.

== Design ==
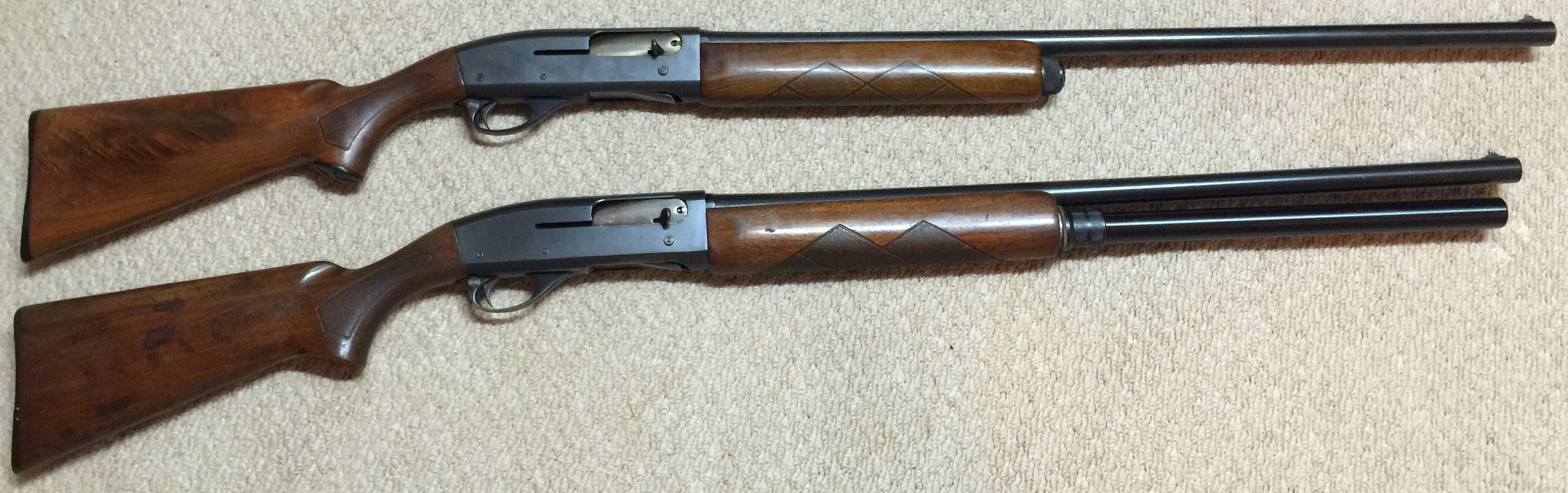
A 1953, B-grade on top; a modernized 1949, A-grade "truck gun" on bottom

The Model 11-48 is a long-recoil operated semi-automatic shotgun based on the Model 11, itself based on an 1898 design by John Browning. Shells are stored in a tubular magazine under the barrel. When a chambered shell is fired, the barrel and bolt recoiling together (for a distance greater than the shell length) re-cock the hammer, eject the spent shell, and feed another shell from the magazine into the action.

The Model 11-48 was revolutionary in that it ushered in stamped steel components for a lower cost of assembly, a mass production technology pioneered by the German firearms industry shortly before WWII (adopted in Remington's military rifle production with the M1903A3, and in civilian rifles with the Model 721 in 1948) which was not used in civilian shotguns prior to 1949, and featured truly interchangeable parts not requiring fitting by a gunsmith, and was reliable in the extreme. The impact of these changes can be seen on every Remington shotgun since, and is also prevalent on competitor's models. The Model 11-48 differs from the Model 11 in the shape of its machined steel receiver and the use of less expensive stamped steel internal parts. The easily removable aluminum trigger housing was also featured on its successors.

Like the Model 11, the gun operated by way of two return springs. The first, located in the buttstock, serves as the resistance to the bolt. The second spring, located over the magazine tube, serves as the barrel recoil spring, allowing the barrel to recoil several inches into the receiver. The 11-48 differs from the Model 11 in the friction ring placed at the forward end of the barrel recoil spring. The Model 11 had a brass friction ring with one blunt end and one beveled end. The ring fit into a corresponding cut in the barrel underlug. For heavy loads, the ring was turned with the beveled end facing the lug. For lighter loads, the blunt end was turned to face the lug. The 11-48 features a similar friction ring system but in later production years, it was modified to be self-adjusting so as to work with all loads.

In 1956, Remington introduced the gas-operated Model 58, which proved more expensive to make than the Model 11–48, and was also less reliable and heavier. Remington chose to replace the Model 58 with a model that combined its best features with those of the Model 11–48. The resulting Model 1100 introduced in 1963 immediately replaced the Model 58 and proved so successful that it soon also replaced the Model 11–48.

== Variants ==
The Model 11-48 introduced a streamlined look that was designed by John Vassos and continues on present day Remington shotguns. Vassos was RCA's foremost industrial designer, credited with designing radios, broadcast equipment, and the first mass-produced television for RCA seen at the 1939 New York World's Fair. A decorated veteran of World War II, Vassos was chief of the OSS "Spy School" in Cairo, Egypt, from 1942 to 1945, responsible for training agents sent to Greece, the Balkans, and Italy.

The Sportsman '48 was a variant introduced to comply with various American hunting laws that limited shotguns used for hunting to three shells. It came with a crimped magazine tube that allowed it to be loaded with only two shells in the magazine. One additional round placed in the chamber brought its total capacity to three shells. It came in 12, 16, and 20 gauge variations. The dimples pressed into the magazine tube can be removed with a round file from the inside, allowing the magazine to accept a full complement of four shells. The Model 1148SA was designed for skeet. The Model 1148 was also available in higher grades with fancy wood and custom engraving.

== Military use ==
Small numbers of the Model 11-48 were purchased by soldiers for use in the Korean War. Small numbers were again purchased by soldiers and fielded in the Vietnam War by the United States Marine Corps.
