= Weatherby PA-08 =

Pump action shotgun

The Weatherby PA-08 is a 12 gauge 3 in (76 mm) pump action shotgun marketed by Weatherby Inc. The shotgun is economically priced and constitutes the low end of products marketed by Weatherby. The PA-08 is manufactured in Turkey for Weatherby.

Weatherby markets three versions of the shotgun, an Upland version which has walnut furniture, the Synthetic which features an injected-molded lightweight stock and the PA-08 TR (Threat Response) which sports a similar stock as the Synthetic. Both the Upland and the Synthetic are available with a 26 in (660 mm) or a 28 in (710 mm). The PA-08 TR is marketed as a home defense shotgun and has a 18.5 in (470 mm) barrel. All versions of these shotguns can handle both 2.75 in (70 mm) or 3 in (76 mm) 12 gauge shells.

Weatherby also markets the SA-08, a semi-automatic version of this firearm.
