= Remington Model 58 =

- Type: Semi-automatic shotgun
- Place of origin: United States

Production history
- Designer: L. Ray Critendon, Ellis Hailston, and Phillip R. Haskell
- Designed: 1956
- Manufacturer: Remington Arms
- Produced: 1956–1963
- No. built: ~271,000

Specifications
- Cartridge: 12, 16, or 20 gauge
- Action: Semi-automatic gas operated
- Feed system: 2+1 round tube magazine
- Sights: Bead front, mid-bead on skeet model, plain or vent rib barrel, notch rear; blade front option

The Remington Model 58, also known as the Sportsman 58, is a semi-automatic shotgun manufactured by Remington Arms in the mid-20th century. It was Remington's first gas operated shotgun and was marketed alongside the recoil operated Model 11-48. The Model 58 was manufactured in 12, 16, and 20 gauge from 1956 to 1963, until it was replaced by the Model 1100.

== Design ==
Being Remington's first gas operated shotgun, the Model 58 suffered from many design shortcomings compared to the contemporary Model 11-48 with which it shared many design features and parts. The gas system was built into the front of the magazine and therefore limited capacity of the tube magazine to two shells. Gas was tapped from a hole in the barrel into a large chamber. A piston in this chamber drove an action bar rearward which, in turn, operated the bolt to cycle the action. The action spring was also located inside the forward end of the magazine tube.

The Model 58 was produced in several version and grades, including a magnum version which could accept 3-inch (7.6 cm) shells, and versions with rifle sights ("Rifled Slug Specials"). The Model 878 was introduced in 1959 with an improved "self-adjusting" gas system, offered in 12 gauge only. The Model 58 and Model 878 are virtually the same, with only differences in the gas piston and cosmetics.

The design proved more expensive to make than the Model 11-48, and was also less reliable and heavier. Remington chose to replace the Model 58 with a model that combined its best features with those of the Model 11-48. The resulting Model 1100 immediately replaced the Model 58 and proved so successful that it soon also replaced the Model 11-48.
