= Weatherby SA-08 =

Semi-automatic shotgun

The Weatherby SA-08 is a semi-automatic shotgun that was marketed by Weatherby Inc, but has been discontinued. The shotgun is available in either 12, 20, or 28 gauge. Like the Weatherby PA-08 pump-action shotgun, this shotgun constitutes Weatherby's low-end shotgun line. The SA-08 is manufactured in Turkey by ATA Arms for Weatherby. This semi-automatic uses a dual valve system which require to be manually changed out when moving from light to heavy loads and vice versa.

== Models ==
The SA-08 is available in six models. All 12 and 20 gauge models come with improved cylinder modified and full choke tubes. 12 gauge models weigh 6.75 lb (3.06 kg) and 20 gauge models weigh 6 lb (2.7 kg)

=== Upland ===
The Upland version comes with a walnut stock and is available in both 12 and 20 gauges and with either a 26 in (660 mm) or 28 in (710 mm) barrel.

=== Synthetic ===
The Synthetic is offered with similar options as the Upland with the exception that it comes with an injected molded synthetic stock.

=== Waterfowl 3.0 ===
The Waterfowl 3.0 is similar to the Synthetic but only comes in a 12 gauge. A special dipping process is used to adhere the Mothwing Marsh Mimicry camouflage to all metal and synthetic components of the firearm.

=== Synthetic Youth ===
The Synthetic Youth model is similar to the Synthetic except that it is available only in 20 gauge and comes with a 24 in (610 mm) barrel.

=== Deluxe ===
The Deluxe model is similar to and is available in the same options as the Upland model. The stock and metal work have a high gloss finish.

=== Entre Rios ===
The Entre Rios is a shotgun for the shooting of doves. It is available only in 28 gauge and is available with either a 26 in (660 mm) or 28 in (710 mm) barrel. Finish is similar to that of the Deluxe model. This model comes with skeet, improved cylinder and modified chokes. The Entre Rios model weigh about 5.25 lb (2.38 kg).
