= Benelli Vinci =

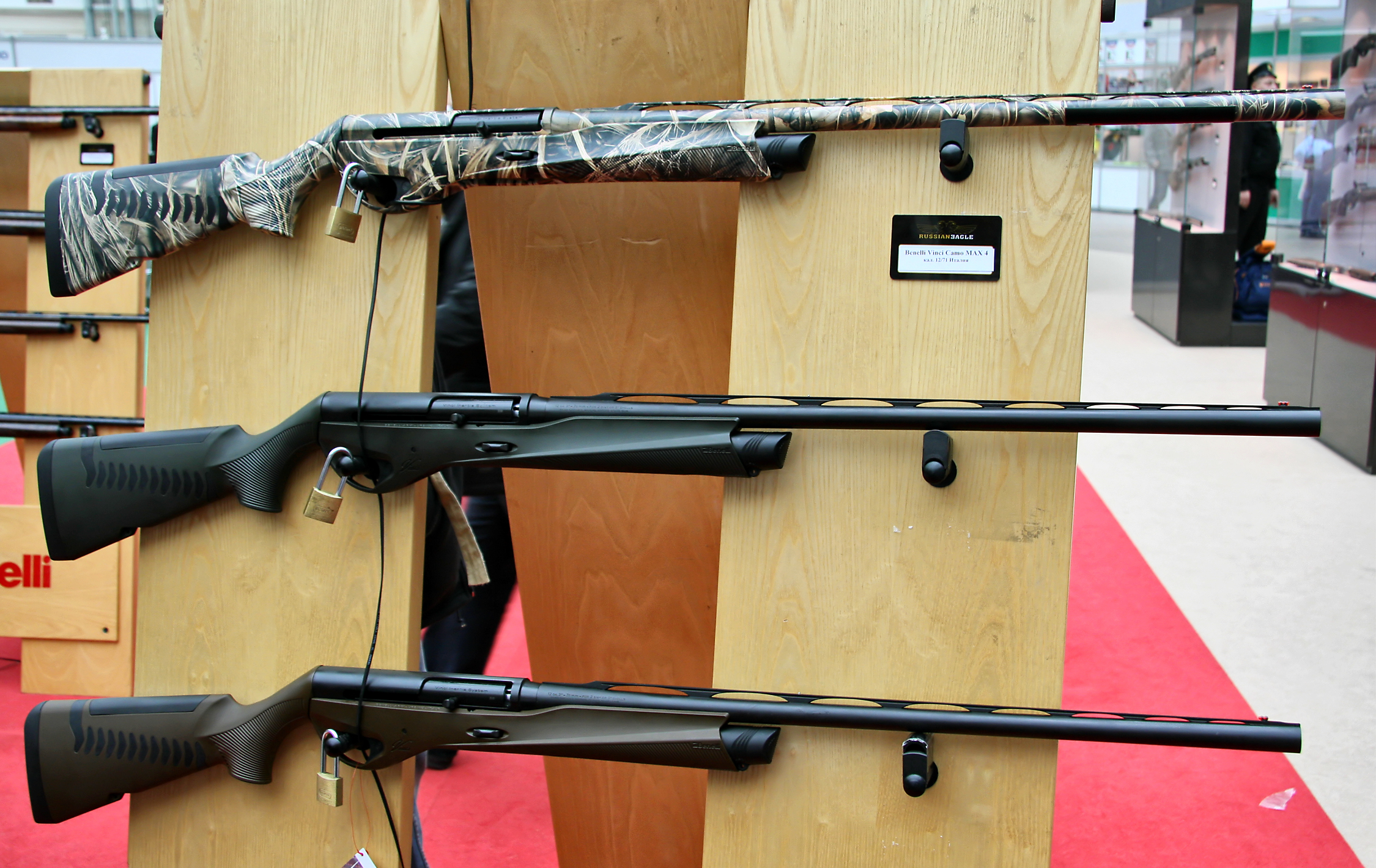
- Various Benelli Vinci shotguns on display
- Type: Semi-automatic shotgun
- Place of origin: Italy

Production history
- Designer: Benelli Armi SpA
- Designed: 2009
- Manufacturer: Benelli Armi SpA
- Unit cost: $1,379–$1,599 MSRP
- Produced: Vinci: 2009–2019 Super Vinci: 2010–2021

Specifications
- Mass: 6.7–6.9 lbs
- Length: 43.75–49.75 inches
- Barrel length: 24–28 inches
- Cartridge: 12 gauge shotgun shell
- Action: Inertia operation
- Feed system: 3+1 tubular magazine

The Benelli Vinci is a semi-automatic shotgun manufactured and sold by Benelli Armi SpA. It uses an inertia-driven system of operation, and contains recoil-reducing features. It also features a modular design consisting of the barrel/receiver module (containing the operating system, free-floating barrel, and bolt), the trigger group/forearm module (containing the trigger assembly, safety, shell carrier and magazine), and the buttstock. The shotgun was named after Leonardo da Vinci. It is Benelli's first shotgun to feature an in-line inertia-driven operating system. It is intended primarily for hunting, however, on March 15, 2012, Benelli tested the Vinci to NATO standards AC/225 (LG/3-SG/1) 2.5 in which the Vinci passed every test. The Vinci is capable of firing 2.75 or 3 inch shells, while the "Super Vinci" model is capable of firing 3.5 inch shells as well. According to Benelli, the Vinci was discontinued in 2019 and the Super Vinci in 2021. Since then, Benelli has removed the Vinci and Super Vinci from its USA website and US market as of late 2022.
