= Sjögren shotgun =

Sjögren Shotgun
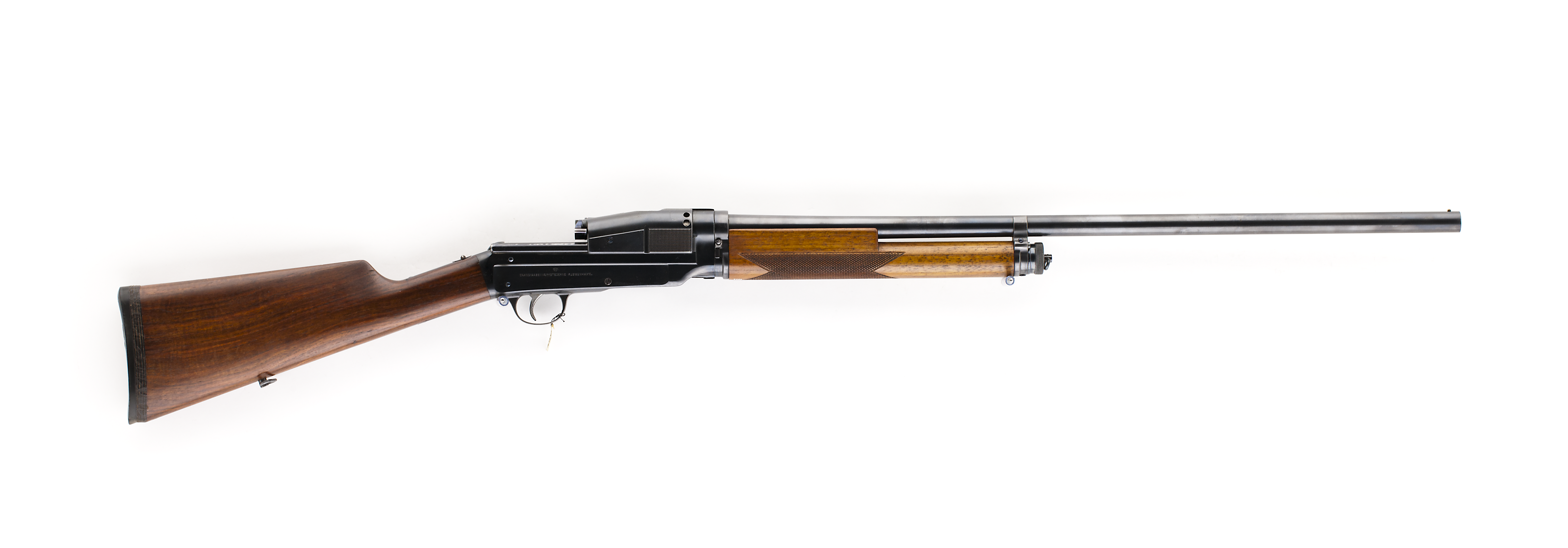
- A Sjögren shotgun on display at the Livrustkammaren
- Type: Semi-automatic shotgun
- Place of origin: Sweden

Production history
- Designer: Carl Axel Theodor Sjögren
- Designed: Patents issued in 1900, 1903 and 1905
- Manufacturer: AB Svenska Vapen- och Ammunitions Fabriken, Stockholm; Håndvåbenværkstederne Kjøbenhavn, Copenhagen
- Produced: 1908–1909
- No. built: c. 5,000
- Variants: None

Specifications
- Cartridge: 12 gauge 16 gauge
- Action: recoil
- Feed system: 4+1-round tubular magazine (shotgun); 5- round box magazine (rifle)
- Sights: bead

The Sjögren Inertia Shotgun (marked: Automat, system Sjögren Patent) is a 12–16 gauge semi-automatic shotgun that was designed by the Swedish inventor Carl Axel Theodor Sjögren, initially manufactured by AB Svenska Vapen- och Ammunitionsfabriken in Sweden and then by Håndvåbenværkstederne Kjøbenhavn in Denmark.

== Design details ==
=== Inertia recoil mechanism ===
The Sjögren utilizes an inertia recoil system, a mechanism which was later revived by the Italian firm Benelli in weapons such as the Benelli M1, and followed through every other of the "Super 90" line of shotguns, The inertia recoil system sees the bolt fully locked to the barrel, upon being fired, the weapon utilizes its own recoil such that the weapon's spring forces the inertial mass of the bolt backwards, unlocking it, then moving the bolt to the rear of the weapon, allowing space for a new round to be chambered and compressing the return spring, which moves the bolt back to its original stance similar to a semiautomatic pistol, afterwards locking the bolt in place, making the weapon ready to fire.

=== Weapon takedown ===
The Sjögren has a relatively simple takedown method, where all that needs to be done is the press of a button and unscrewing of the internal magazine, followed by unlocking of the barrel left-ward, effectively detaching the front portion of the gun (the barrel and magazine) from its weapon's receiver and stock.

=== Sjögren-system military rifles ===
A small number of semi automatic military rifles in 7.62×63mm caliber were based on the Swedish Mauser using the Sjögren's Inertia system, fed from internal seven round magazines, were also built, and tested by potential buyers, but found no market.

== Sources ==
- (1972). Guns Review (11).
- Marsh, Roger. (1947). "The Sjögren Shotgun and Sjögren Military Rifle". The Weapon Series (6).
- Peterson, Phillip. (2010). "Gun Collector’s Corner - Sjögren, The First 12-Gauge Auto". Gun Digest (11).
- Bates, James. (1977). "Sjögren Weapons - part I". The Gun Report (10).
- Bates, James. (1977). "Sjögren Weapons - part II". The Gun Report (11).
