= Franchi LF-57 =

LF57
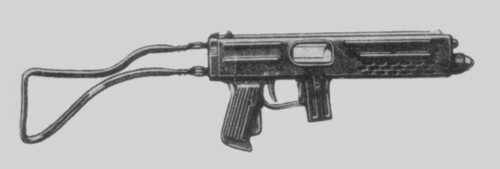
- Luigi Franchi LF57 Submachine gun.
- Type: Submachine gun
- Place of origin: Italy

Service history
- In service: 1962–present
- Used by: See Users
- Wars: Congo Crisis; Portuguese Colonial War; Nigerian Civil War

Production history
- Designer: Luigi Franchi
- Manufacturer: Franchi
- Produced: 1956 or 1957-c.1980
- Variants: LF-62

Specifications
- Mass: 3,17 kg (7 lb)
- Length: 419 mm (16.50 in) butt folded, 686 mm (27 in.) butt extended
- Barrel length: 203 mm (8 in.)
- Caliber: 9×19mm Parabellum
- Action: Blowback
- Rate of fire: 500 rounds/min
- Muzzle velocity: 365 m/s (1200 ft/s)
- Effective firing range: 25 m 82 (ft)
- Feed system: 20 or 40-round magazine
- Sights: Iron sights

The Franchi LF-57 is a submachine gun chambered in 9×19mm Parabellum designed and manufactured by the Italian Luigi Franchi.

== Development ==
The development of the LF-57 was started by Franchi in 1956; it went into production in 1957. It shares many design features the Beretta Model 12 submachine gun, considered a rival design to the LF-57.

13,500 units of the gun were delivered to the Italian Army, as well as the 13th "Aquileia" Target Acquisition Group (Gr.Ac.O.) of the 3rd Missile Brigade "Aquileia" of Portogruaro.

In 1962, it was supplied to the COMSUBIN of the Italian Navy, but shortly afterwards it was replaced with the Beretta PM 12. Subsequently, the Heckler & Koch MP5 replaced the LF-57 in the Italian Army. 10,000 copies of the weapon were also purchased by the Portuguese Army which used it in the wars in Angola, Guinea-Bissau, Mozambique and the Democratic Republic of Congo in the years immediately following independence from Belgium.

The production of this weapon continued until 1980, with a total of 30,000 examples built for the foreign market, as it was unsuccessful within domestic Italian military and law-enforcement markets.

== Design ==
The LF-57 is mainly constructed of pressed-metal. The LF-57 uses a recessed bolt head similar to the Beretta Model 12's as a method of reducing the weapon's length, although on the LF57 the bolt's mass is carried above the barrel rather than around it. This allows manufacture to be simplified to a degree. Most parts are made of stampings and pressings, and the two sides of the gun are one piece each, joined by a long seam.

Removing certain parts, such as the barrel, is simple since it's held on by one single barrel nut. The tubular butt folds to the right side of the receiver, and the pistol grip is made entirely of steel. The sights are simple fixtures on the top of the barrel.

== Users ==
- Angola
- Congo-Brazzaville
- Democratic Republic of Congo (formerly Zaire)
  - Katanga
  - Front for Congolese National Liberation
- Italy
- Portugal
- Mozambique
- Nigeria

=== Non-State Actors ===
- Anyanya

== Bibliography ==
- Ian V. Hogg; John S. Weeks (2000). Military Small Arms of the 20th Century. Krause Publications. p. 141. ISBN 9780873418249.
