= SRM Arms Model 1216 =

Model 1216
- Type: Semi-automatic shotgun
- Place of origin: United States

Production history
- Designed: 2009
- Manufacturer: SRM Arms
- Unit cost: $1,499–2,500
- Produced: 2011–present

Specifications
- Mass: 7.25 lbs (3.29 kg)
- Length: 32.5 in (82.6 cm)
- Barrel length: 18 in (45.72 cm)
- Cartridge: 12 gauge
- Action: Delayed blowback
- Feed system: 16 round detachable quad-tube revolver magazine
- Sights: Picatinny Rails for optics

The SRM Arms Model 1216 is a delayed blowback semi-automatic shotgun with a 16-round detachable revolver magazine. Designed for mobility, it is light and short and intended for home defense and law enforcement.

== Design details ==
The most unusual feature of the M1216 is the detachable magazine.

The magazine which runs parallel to the barrel is made of four tubes, each with its own spring and follower. Each tube can hold four 2 3/4" or 3" shells for a total of sixteen.

When inserted into the gun, the operator can flip a switch and manually rotate the entire magazine, either clockwise or counter clockwise, to choose which tube feeds into the receiver.

In a tactical application, by loading different shells in different tubes, this would allow the operator to switch between different types of shells to adapt to a changing scenario, or it could allow rapid fire of all 16 rounds.

Once the magazine is empty, pressing the release switch to drop the magazine allows it to be replaced with a full one.

The M1216 has a polymer stock to reduce weight and a steel upper receiver. The manual safety, charging handle and ejection port can all be removed and relocated to either the left or right side of the receiver to accommodate the operator's preferences.

Picatinny Rails line the top and sides of the shotgun allowing a wide variety of attachments such as sights, lasers, and flashlights to be used.

== Variants ==
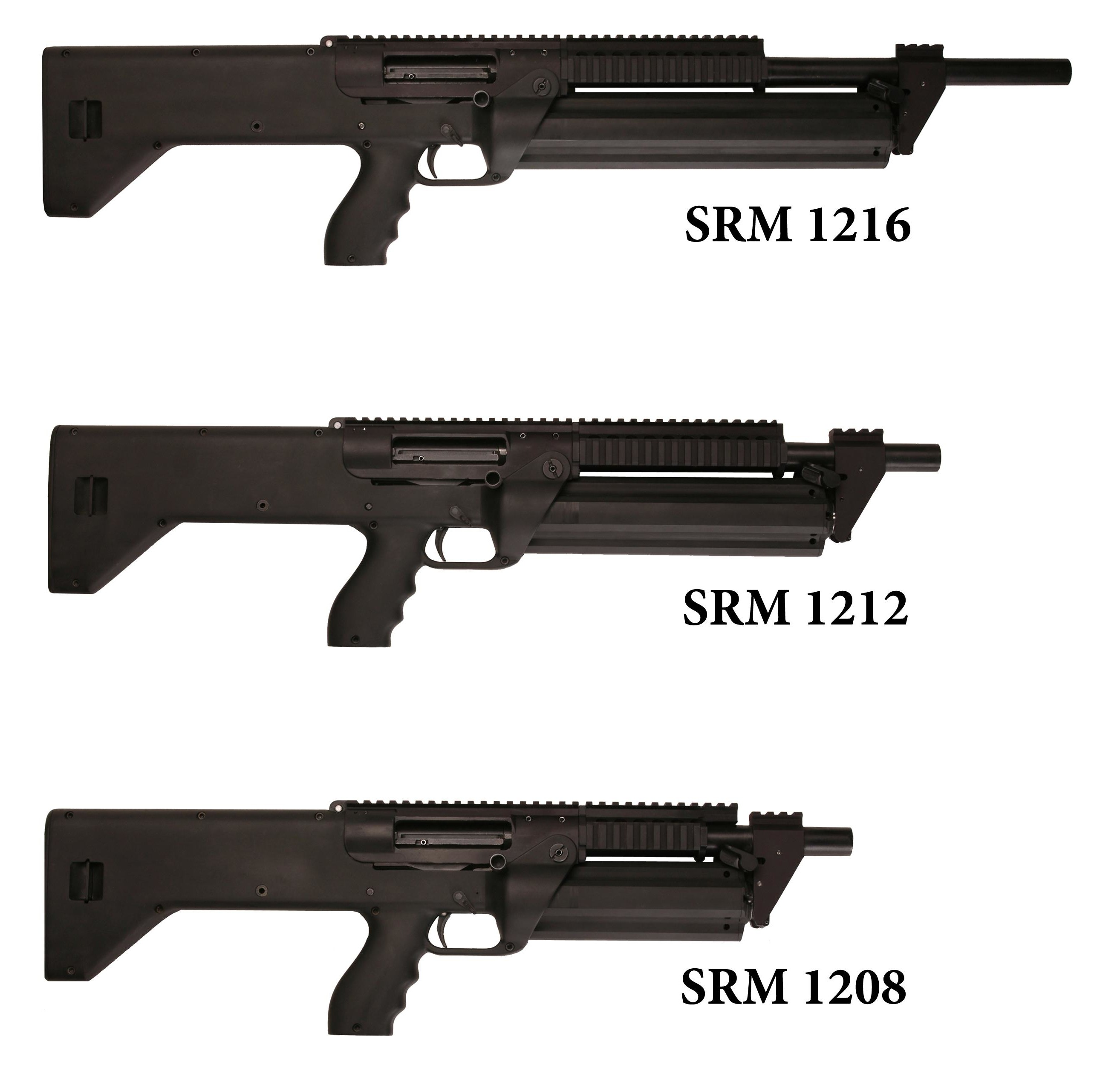
All variants of the Model 1216.

=== Model 1212 ===
The Model 1212 is a short-barreled variant of the Model 1216.

Its barrel length is 13", its overall length is 27 1/2", and the detachable magazine holds 12 rounds (4 x 3 shells).

As the barrel is shorter than 18", the 1212 is regulated by the NFA as a Short-barreled shotgun.

=== Model 1208 ===
The Model 1208 is also a short-barreled variant of the Model 1216.

Its barrel length is 10", its overall length is 24 1/2", and its magazine can hold 8 rounds (4 x 2 shells).

The Model 1208 also has a barrel shorter than 18 and is therefore also regulated by the NFA as a short-barreled shotgun.
