= Remington Model SP-10 =

- Type: Semi-automatic shotgun
- Place of origin: United States

Production history
- Manufacturer: Remington Arms
- Produced: 1989–2010

Specifications
- Mass: 11 lb (5.0 kg)
- Length: 44.5–51.5 in (113–131 cm)
- Barrel length: 23–30 in (58–76 cm)
- Cartridge: 10 gauge (3½")
- Action: Semi-automatic gas-operated
- Feed system: Tube magazine 2+1 rounds
- Sights: Brass bead or fiber-optic

The Remington Model SP-10 is a gas-operated semi-automatic shotgun chambered for 10 gauge 3 1/2-inch (8.9 cm) Magnum shells. It was produced by Remington Arms from 1989 to 2010. The design was based on the Ithaca Mag-10.

The standard SP-10 featured a wood stock, 30-inch vent rib barrel and weighed 11 pounds. Camo models featured either a 23- or 26-inch barrel.
