= Intrepid RAS-12 =

- Type: Semi auto Shotgun
- Place of origin: United States

Production history
- Manufacturer: Intrepid Tactical Solutions

Specifications
- Cartridge: 12 Gauge rebated rim
- Action: Gas operated
- Rate of fire: Semi auto

The Intrepid RAS-12/AR-12 is a semi auto shotgun derived from the AR-10 platform and manufactured by Intrepid Tactical Solutions. The weapon is chambered in a proprietary rebated rim 12 gauge round.

Development on the RAS-12 began in July 2011, and it was announced at SHOT Show Las Vegas in January 2013. Intrepid Tactical Solutions is defunct as of September 2014.
