= Remington Model 1100 =

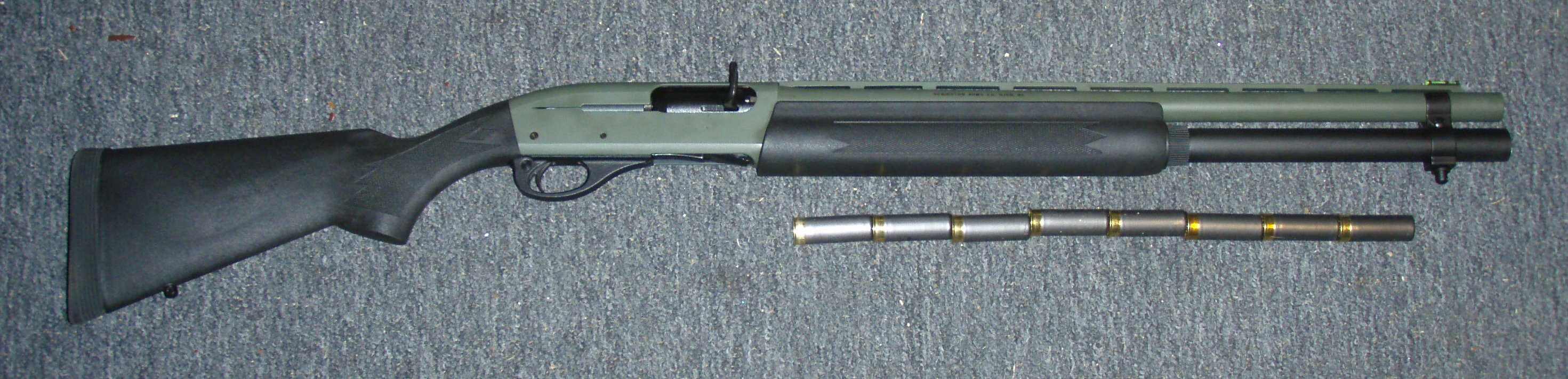
- The Remington Model 1100 Tactical Shotgun 12 gauge
- Type: Semi-automatic shotgun
- Place of origin: United States

Service history
- Used by: See Users

Production history
- Designer: Wayne Leek & Robert Kelley
- Manufacturer: Remington Arms
- Produced: 1963–present
- No. built: 4,000,000

Specifications
- Mass: 8 lb (3.6 kg) (28" barrel)
- Barrel length: 18 to 30 inches (460 to 760 mm)
- Cartridge: 12, 16, 20, 28 gauge, and .410 bore
- Action: Semi-automatic, gas-operated
- Feed system: 4 to 8 round tube magazine

The Remington Model 1100 is a gas-operated semi-automatic shotgun introduced by Remington Arms in 1963.

== History ==
Designed by Wayne Leek and Robert Kelley, the Remington Model 1100 was introduced in 1963 as a successor to the Model 58 and Model 878 gas operated shotguns. The Model 58 had supplanted the recoil operated Model 11-48, which retained the long recoil action of John Browning's original design, present in the Model 11 and the Browning Auto-5. Upon its introduction in 1963, the Model 1100 replaced the Model 58 and Model 878, and later replaced the Model 11-48 as well.

All models of the series are gas operated with a mechanism that noticeably reduces recoil. As of 1983, it was the best selling autoloading shotgun in U.S. history, in dollar terms.

A plain version of the Model 1100 in 12 gauge, named the Sportsman 12 Auto, was sold in stores such as Target, Kmart, and Walmart in the mid-1980s, along with the Sportsman 12 Pump, which was a plain Model 870. The Sportsman 12 Auto had less costly birch stocks and less rollmarking on the gun's receiver. These were simply cosmetic differences, and all Model 1100 parts in 12 gauge are fully interchangeable, including barrels and receivers. Both Sportsman 12 offerings were discontinued in 1987, concurrent with the introduction of the semi-automatic Model 11-87 and the pump action Model 870 Express.

In 2011, Remington introduced the Model 1100 Competition Synthetic. A 50th Anniversary highly decorated version was introduced in 2013. Over four million Model 1100 shotguns have been produced. Several variations of the series—in 12, 20, and 28 gauges, and .410 bore—remain in contemporary production.

== Design ==
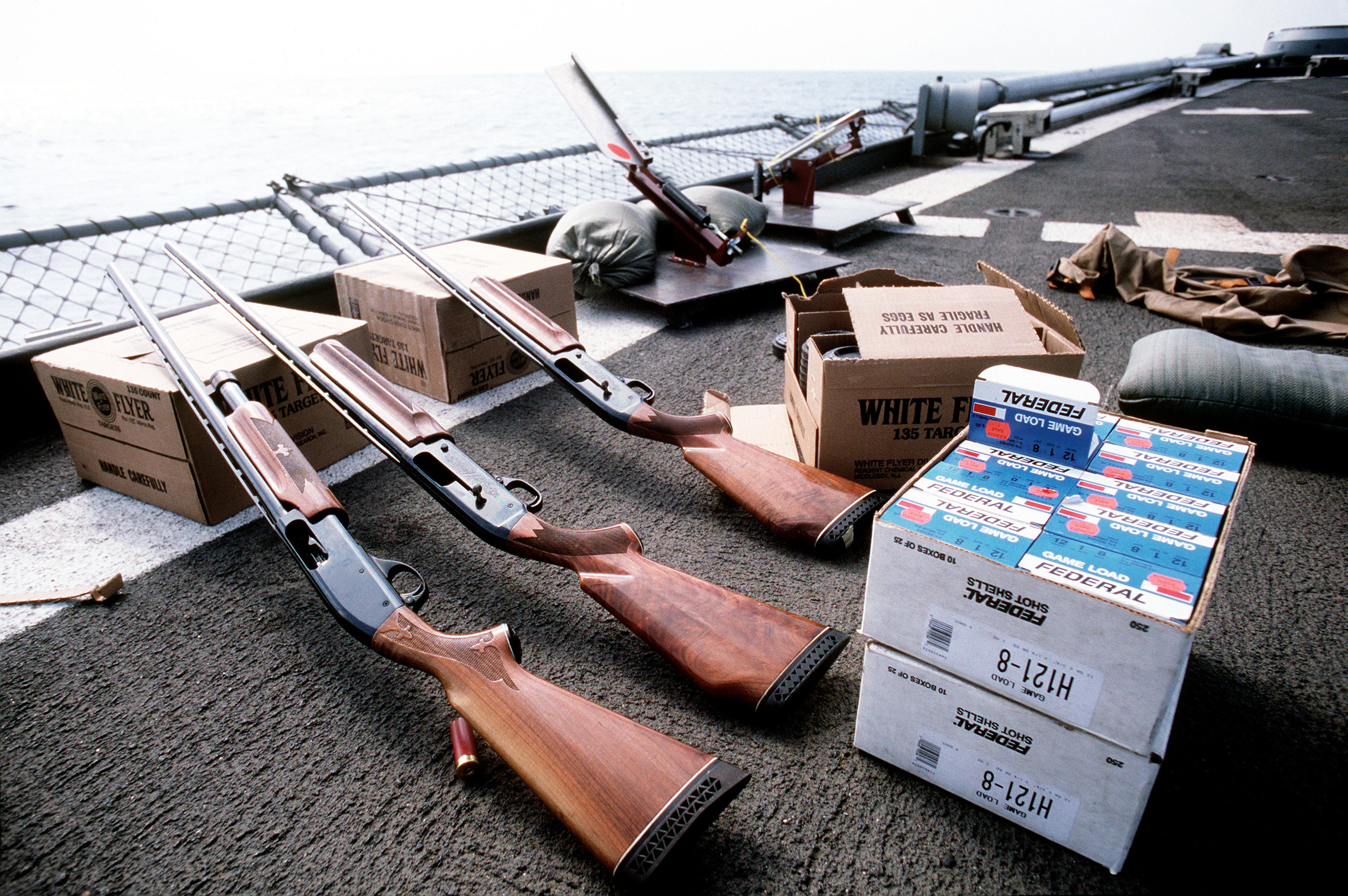
Wingmaster 12-gauge shotgun, two Remington 1100 12-gauge shotguns, boxes of shells and clay targets are laid out on the fantail of the battleship USS MISSOURI (BB-63) in preparation for skeet shooting practice.

The Model 1100 bleeds off gases to operate the action through ports in the barrel near the fore end. The gasses then drive a steel action sleeve that fits around the magazine tube and connects to the bolt carrier to the rear, ejecting the spent shell. A fresh shell is released from the magazine, which trips the carrier release, and the action spring in the stock pushes the bolt forward, picking up the fresh shell and loading it into the chamber. The Model 1100 can fire any 2 3/4-inch (7.0 cm) shell without adjustment in the standard models, and both 2 3/4 and 3-inch (7.6 cm) Magnum shells can be used interchangeably on the Magnum versions.

The Model 1100's carrier release is located on the underside.

== Use ==
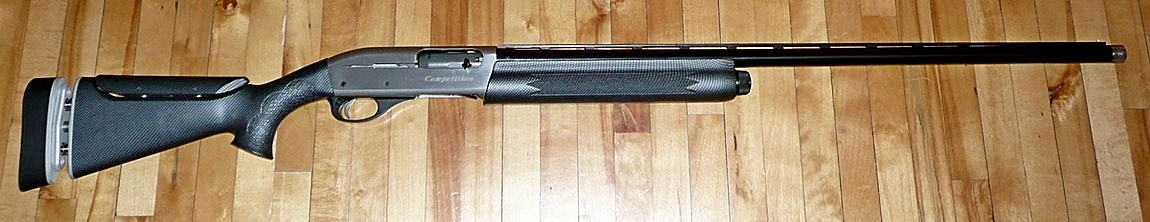
Remington 1100 Competition

=== Model introduction ===
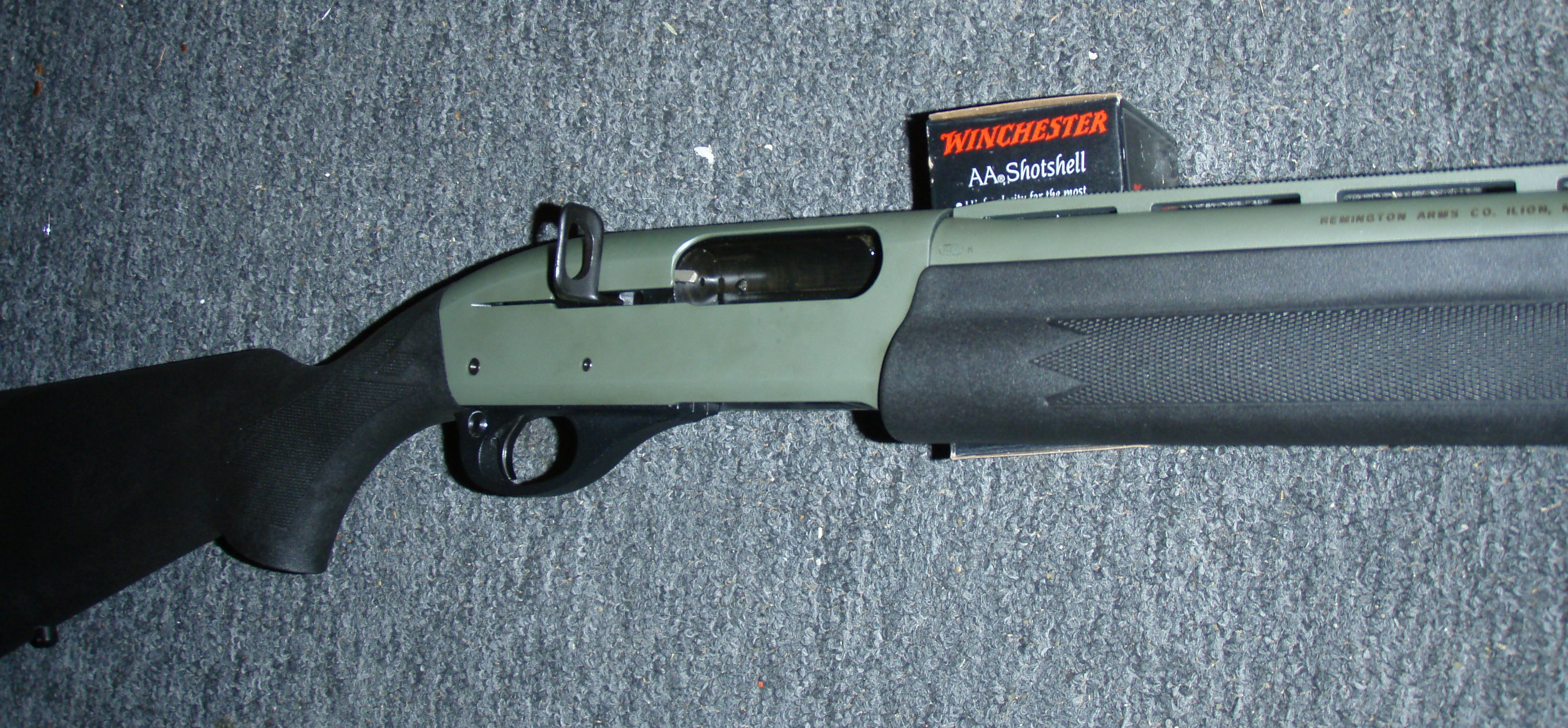
Remington 1100 Tactical Shotgun

- 1963: 12 gauge
- 1964: 16 gauge
- 1964: 20 gauge
- 1969: .410 bore
- 1970: Matched Pair in .410 bore and 28 gauge
- 1970: 20 gauge Lightweight—LW
- 1977: 20 gauge Lightweight—LT

Through the years, there have been numerous limited editions and commemorative models.

A double barrel shotgun concept, the Loughridge Irimu manufactured by Cylinder & Slide of Nebraska exists using 2x Remington 1100s as an "alley sweeper" capable of firing simultaneously. The weapon uses a specially made stock with 2x pistol grips to handle.

Nighthawk Custom offers a customized version of the Remington 1100 for police use, home defense, and competition shooting.

== Users ==
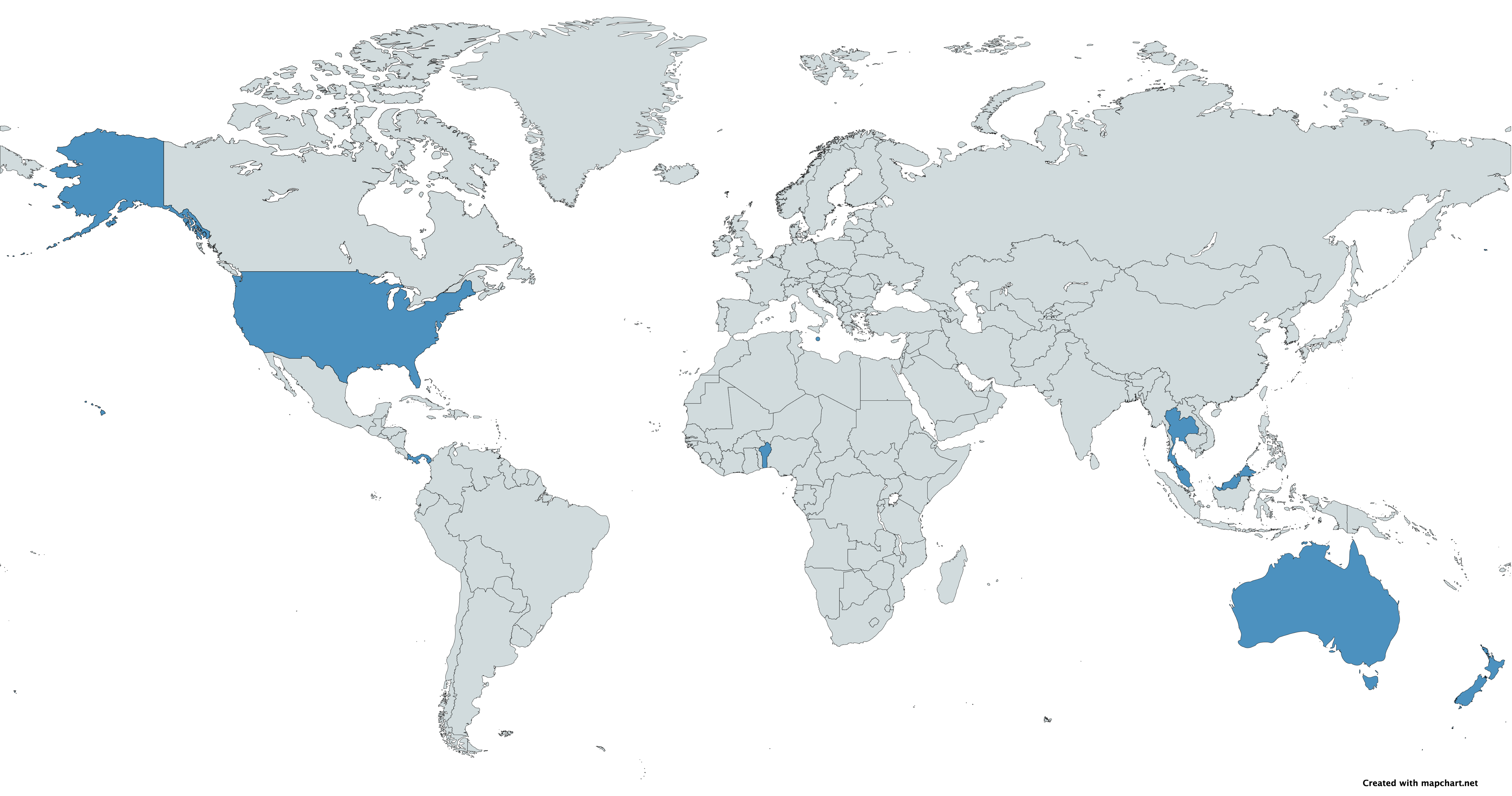
A map with nations who use the Remington Model 1100 in blue

- Australia
- Benin
- Indonesia
- Malaysia
- Malta
- New Zealand
- Panama
- Thailand
- United States
  - Los Angeles Police Department 20 inch barrel, LAPD SWAT team
