= Ithaca Mag-10 =

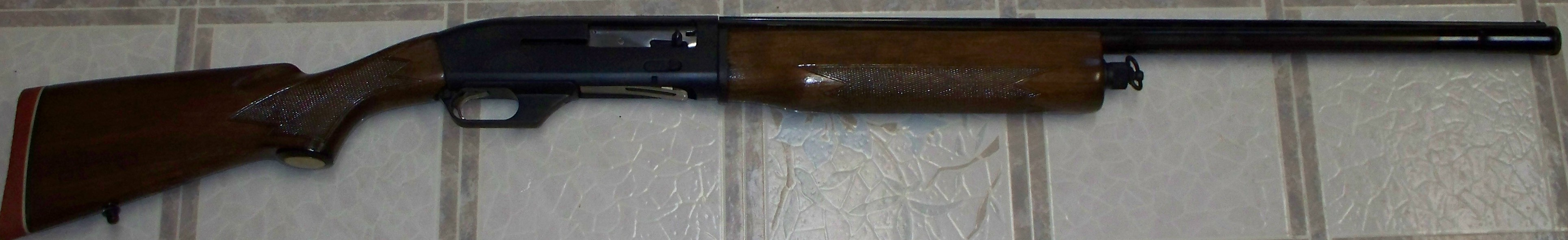
- Type: Shotgun
- Place of origin: United States

Production history
- Manufacturer: Ithaca Gun Company
- Produced: 1975–1989

Specifications
- Mass: 11¼ pounds
- Length: 53½"
- Barrel length: 32"
- Cartridge: 10-Gauge (3½")
- Action: Gas-operated, Semi-automatic
- Feed system: 2-shot magazine tube
- Sights: Brass bead

The Ithaca Mag-10 was the world's first 10 GA semi-automatic gas-operated shotgun chambered in 10-gauge (3½"). The CounterCoil system built into the front of the magazine tube reduced the recoil from the round to allow easier second shots but cut the magazine size in half to 2 shells. Regular models had jeweled-finish bolts, engraved barrels and checkered stocks. It was produced until 1989, at which point Remington Arms bought the design and used it as the basis for the Remington Model SP-10.

== Variants ==
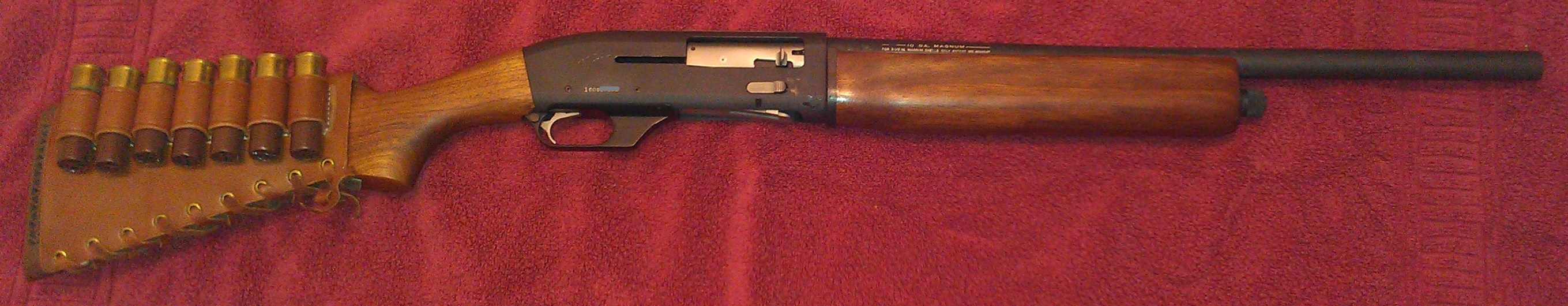
Ithaca Mag 10 Roadblocker serial - block

=== Roadblocker—Special Purpose Police Shotgun ===
The Roadblocker version of the Mag-10 was designed by Ithaca for the law enforcement market and became available from 1978 until 1986 (although no mention of the Roadblocker version in Ithaca catalogs after 1981), but met with little commercial success. The Roadblocker was advertised with both a 20" and 22" (which actually measured out to 21¾") barrels. The option of a plain or vent barrel was also available. The shotgun had a parkerized finish on the barrel, receiver and non-checkered walnut stock and forearm. There were no Ithaca factory markings of the name "Roadblocker" on the shotgun receiver, barrel or stock or any identifying letters in the serial number. Ithaca marketing for the Roadblocker to law enforcement agencies declared the Mag-10 "can stop a car in its tracks."

=== DeerSlayer ===
The DeerSlayer featured a 22" barrel and rifle sights and was optimized for firing slugs. It came in a blued or parkerized finish and a plain stock.

=== General Use ===
The general use Ithaca Mag-10 was equipped with a 32-inch vent rib barrel with auto loading capabilities. Due to its large frame and extended barrel length, it weighs in at 11¼ pounds.

After the U.S. Fish and Wildlife Service banned lead shot for waterfowl hunting in 1991, hunters were forced to use steel shot. The Ithaca Mag-10 was a platform that could deliver large steel shot in heavy payloads for goose hunting.
