= UTAS XTR-12 =

- Type: Shotgun
- Place of origin: Turkey

Production history
- Designed: 2017
- Manufacturer: UTAS Defence

Specifications
- Mass: 3.6kg
- Length: 960mm/1040mm
- Barrel length: 470mm
- Cartridge: 12-gauge
- Action: Gas-operated
- Rate of fire: Semi-auto
- Feed system: 2,5,7,10 rounds

The UTAS XTR-12 is a semi automatic shotgun manufactured by UTAS Defence of Turkey.

== Overview ==
The XTR-12 is a gas operated semi-automatic shotgun derived from the AR-10 platform.
