= High Standard Model 10 =

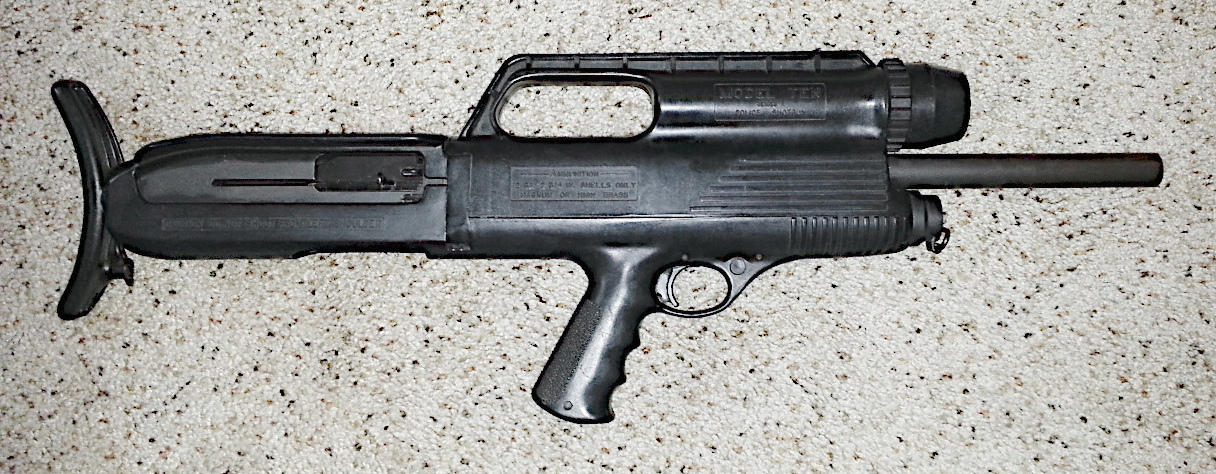
- The High Standard Model 10A
- Type: Bullpup semi-automatic shotgun
- Place of origin: United States

Service history
- Used by: See Users

Production history
- Designer: Alfred Crouch
- Designed: Late 1950s
- Produced: 1967–1977
- Variants: 10A, 10B

Specifications
- Mass: 4.54 kg (10 lbs)
- Length: 660 mm (26 in)
- Barrel length: 457 mm (18 in)
- Cartridge: 12 gauge
- Action: Gas-operated, semi-automatic
- Effective firing range: ~40 m (~45 yards)
- Feed system: 4+1 tube magazine, 6+1 with tube extension
- Sights: Fixed; flip-up front, notched rear

The High Standard Model 10 (HS10) is a gas operated, semi-automatic shotgun that was manufactured by the High Standard Manufacturing Company of Hamden, Connecticut. It is easily recognized by its bullpup design, rotatable shoulder stock, and integrated flashlight.

== History and design ==
The basic design of the Model 10 shotgun was developed in the late 1950s by Alfred Crouch, a Santa Monica, California police sergeant. Crouch's goal was to create the ultimate entry shotgun for SWAT and tactical units. His original design used a modified Remington semi-automatic shotgun.

In the mid 1960s, Crouch sold his design to the High Standard Manufacturing Company, who used their C1200 Supermatic shotgun as the basis for the first model, the 10A. The C1200 Supermatic was modified by replacing the stock, relocating the trigger assembly, and fitting a three-piece plastic shell around the receiver and first half of the barrel. The rearward piece of the shell provided an attachment point for the rotatable shoulder stock. The lower piece of the shell provided the grip. Since the trigger assembly was moved forward to accommodate the bullpup design, a rod that connected the new and original trigger locations was used to allow minimal modifications to the original receiver.

Although the standard capacity of the Model 10 is 4 shells, there was a magazine tube extension available which would increase the capacity to 6 shells.

On the early model shotgun the 10A, the upper plastic section also housed the built-in flashlight and carrying handle.

The later model shotgun the 10B was improved with a left-hand charging handle, flip-up front sight, and utilized the new flashlight mount/carrying handle mounting block (which doubles as the carrying handle mount) as the rear sight. The "Kel-Lite" branded flashlight can be removed, as it is attached to the aforementioned mounting block.

== Service ==
Originally, the Model 10 was sold to law enforcement only. The concept of this shotgun was quite interesting to many police agencies who adopted the Model 10 in the late 1960s and early 1970s; however, most of the agencies found many shortcomings, and ultimately ceased using the Model 10.

The most common problem was the failure to cycle correctly. According to the instructions on the Model 10, only magnum or "high brass" shells were to be used. However, even with the correct shells, the action would sometimes fail to cycle reliably. Other problems that plagued the shotgun were the rough and unpredictable trigger feel, the strange rotatable shoulder stock, and the tendency of the recoil to cause the flashlight's batteries to become damaged.

Another problem was that the Model 10 could only be fired from the right arm, as the gun ejected spent cartridges from the right side of the unit with a high force. There is a warning on the right side of the shotgun reading "CAUTION - DO NOT SHOOT FROM LEFT SHOULDER."

== Users ==
- Argentina: Used by the Argentine Army and the Argentine Navy
- Mexico: Used by the Mexican Army
- United States: Used by various U.S police forces
- Myanmar: Used by People's Defense Force rebels.

== See also ==
- List of bullpup firearms
- List of shotguns
- High Standard Manufacturing Company
