= Beretta Xtrema 2 =

A391 Xtrema2
- Type: Shotgun
- Place of origin: Italy

Production history
- Designer: Beretta USA
- Manufacturer: Beretta
- Unit cost: $1400 for Black Synthetic $1600 for Camo Synthetic

Specifications
- Mass: 8 pounds (3.6 kg)
- Length: 44.75–50.25 inches (1,137–1,276 mm)
- Barrel length: 26–28 inches (660–710 mm) smoothbore, 24 inches (610 mm) rifled slug
- Cartridge: 12 gauge shotgun 3½" Magnum
- Action: Semi-automatic, auto-regulating short-stroke gas piston
- Effective firing range: ~175 yards/meters w/ rifled slug
- Feed system: 2–11 round under-barrel tube magazine
- Sights: Brass bead-sight

The Beretta A391 Xtrema2 is a semi-automatic shotgun developed and produced by Italian firearm manufacturer Beretta. It is used by hunters and target shooters, mainly in the United States. The shotgun is commonly referred to simply as the Xtrema2. The shotgun is found in several variants, depending on barrel length, barrel type, and factory-installed camouflage exterior.

== Overview ==
The Xtrema2 was released in mid-2004, to answer the call from hunters and target shooters for a complete do-all shotgun. Beretta's goal was to produce a shotgun that could reliably fire 2¾” loaded with light target loads all the way through the 3½” super magnum round without any modification or settings to be dealt with. They decided to take the earlier A391 Xtrema 3.5 and update it to fit their needs. They also wanted to add as many recoil reduction features as possible to the shotgun to increase follow-up shot accuracy while target shooting and hunting.

== Technical advantages ==
The Xtrema2 had several features that were designed to increase accuracy and reliability. For one, Beretta decided to strip away as many o-rings and springs as possible for less chance of wear, and also to make easier for the weapon to be field stripped without the accidental loss of parts. They chose to go with a gas-operated action instead of inertia-driven action.

Another advantage is in the over-bored barrel design, which reduces muzzle jump and also improves shot-patterns.

Beretta also redesigned their stock choke system by increasing the length of the choke inside the barrel for a more gradual constriction, without having to add to the length of the barrel like after-market choke tubes do.

They then also chose to take the time-proven technology of hydraulic shock absorption from car-manufactures and put it in the gun's stock for up to 44% felt recoil reduction at the shoulder.

Beretta also saw the need for the gun to be protected from the elements so as to protect the gun in harsh hunting conditions such as water-fowl hunting, where salt spray can damage a gun within hours. Beretta's answer to this need was to coat the gun's working parts in a micro-thin membrane which completely protects the metal (which are not made from stainless steel, chromium, or aluminum) from corrosion while out in the field.

Other improvements include an extra long barrel tang (the part of the barrel that fits into the receiver, and is actually behind the chamber) to more accurately fix the barrel to the receiver in order to increase accuracy when using slugs with a scope fixed to the receiver.

Stock spacers are also available to change the length of pull without major modification. Synthetic stock equipped with the KO (kick-off) recoil reduction module adds about 1” to the overall length of pull (LOP). LOP for synthetic stock with KO is 14 ¼” which cannot be shortened.

== See also ==
- Beretta AL391
