= Franchi (firearms) =

Italian firearms manufacturer

Franchi S.p.A.
- Company type: Firearms manufacturer
- Industry: Firearms
- Founder: Luigi Franchi
- Headquarters: Italy
- Products: Shotguns, rifles
- Parent: Benelli

Luigi Franchi S.p.A. (Italian pronunciation: [luˈiːdʒi ˈfraŋki]) is an Italian manufacturer of firearms, a division of Beretta Holding.

Franchi products include the military SPAS-12 and SPAS-15 and the sporting-type long-recoil action AL-48. Franchi manufactures over and under, and semi-automatic shotguns.

Franchi remained a family business since its founding until 1987, when it was acquired by the industrial conglomerate Socimi, based in Milan; with the bankruptcy of Socimi in 1993, Franchi was acquired by Beretta Holding.

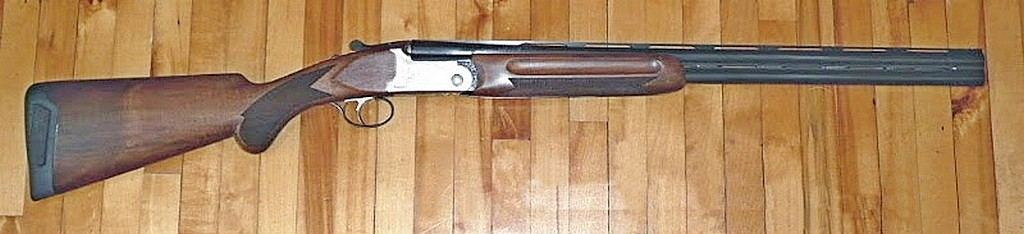
Franchi Renaissance Classic O/U 20Ga

== Firearms ==
=== Submachine guns ===
- Franchi LF-57

=== Rifles ===
- Franchi LF-58 - .30 Carbine assault rifle.
- Franchi LF-59 - 7.62×51mm NATO battle rifle.
- Franchi mod. 641 - 5.56×45mm NATO assault rifle
- Franchi 'Centennial' - .22LR rifle. Made in 1968 only to commemorate their 100-year anniversary.
- Franchi Para - .22LR Rifle - 8000 made, 3000 of which imported to the US by FIE

=== Shotguns ===
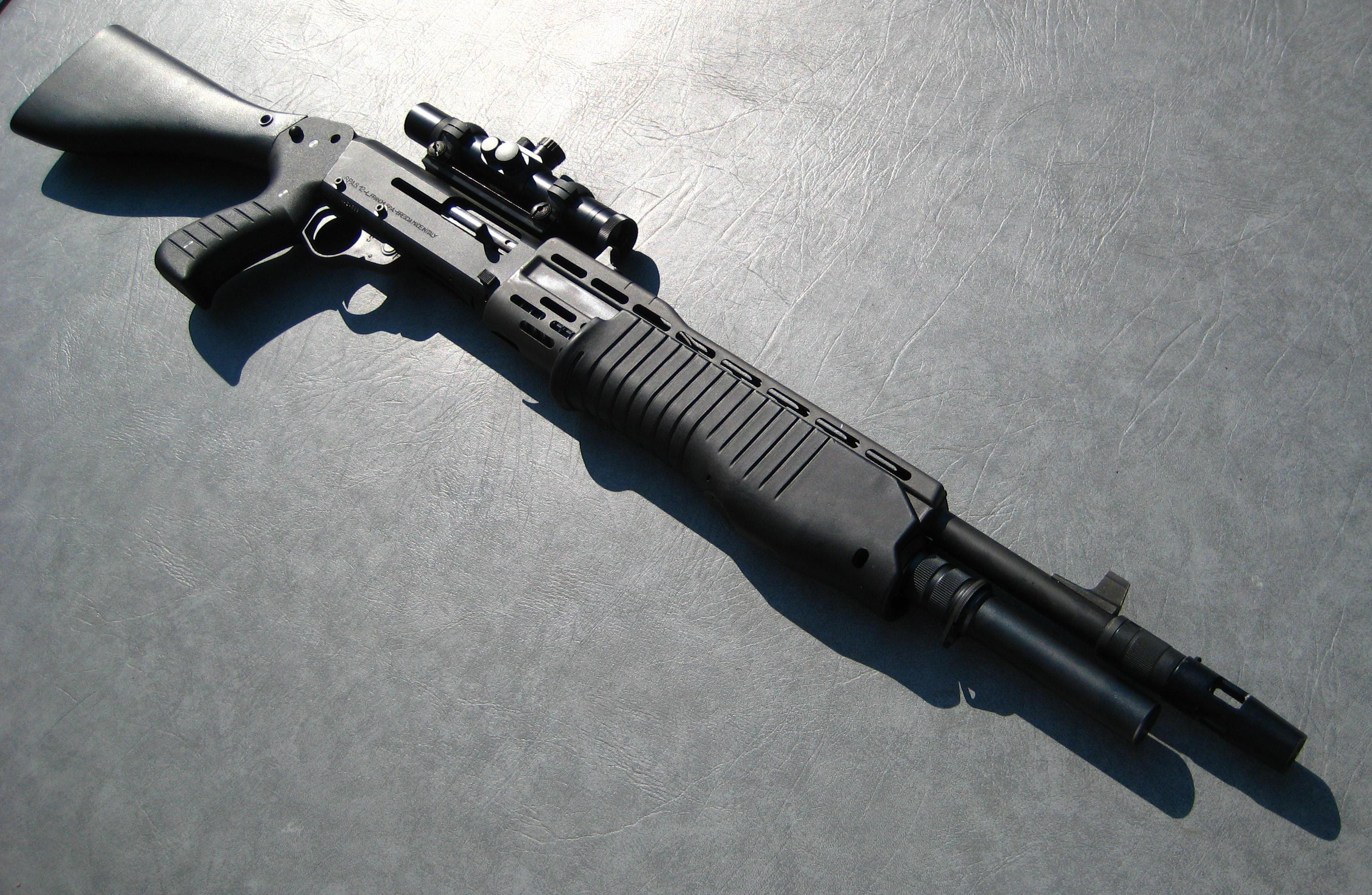
SPAS-12 with a fixed stock, a scope, & a shot diverter

- SPAS-12
- SPAS-15
- AL-48500
- PA3
- PA8
- Franchi 912
- Franchi 612
- Franchi 620
- Franchi 720
- Franchi 2003
- Franchi 2005
- Franchi Intensity
- Franchi Instinct L, LX and SL
- Franchi Renaissance Classic and Elite
- Franchi Affinity
- Franchi Alcione
- Franchi LAW-12
- Franchi SAS-12
- Franchi 500
- Franchi Momentum
- Franchi Horizon

=== Revolvers ===
- RF 83 - Inexpensive service revolver chambered in .38 Special

== See also ==
- List of Italian companies
- List of Italian submachine guns
