= Browning Auto-5 =

Type of semi-automatic shotgun

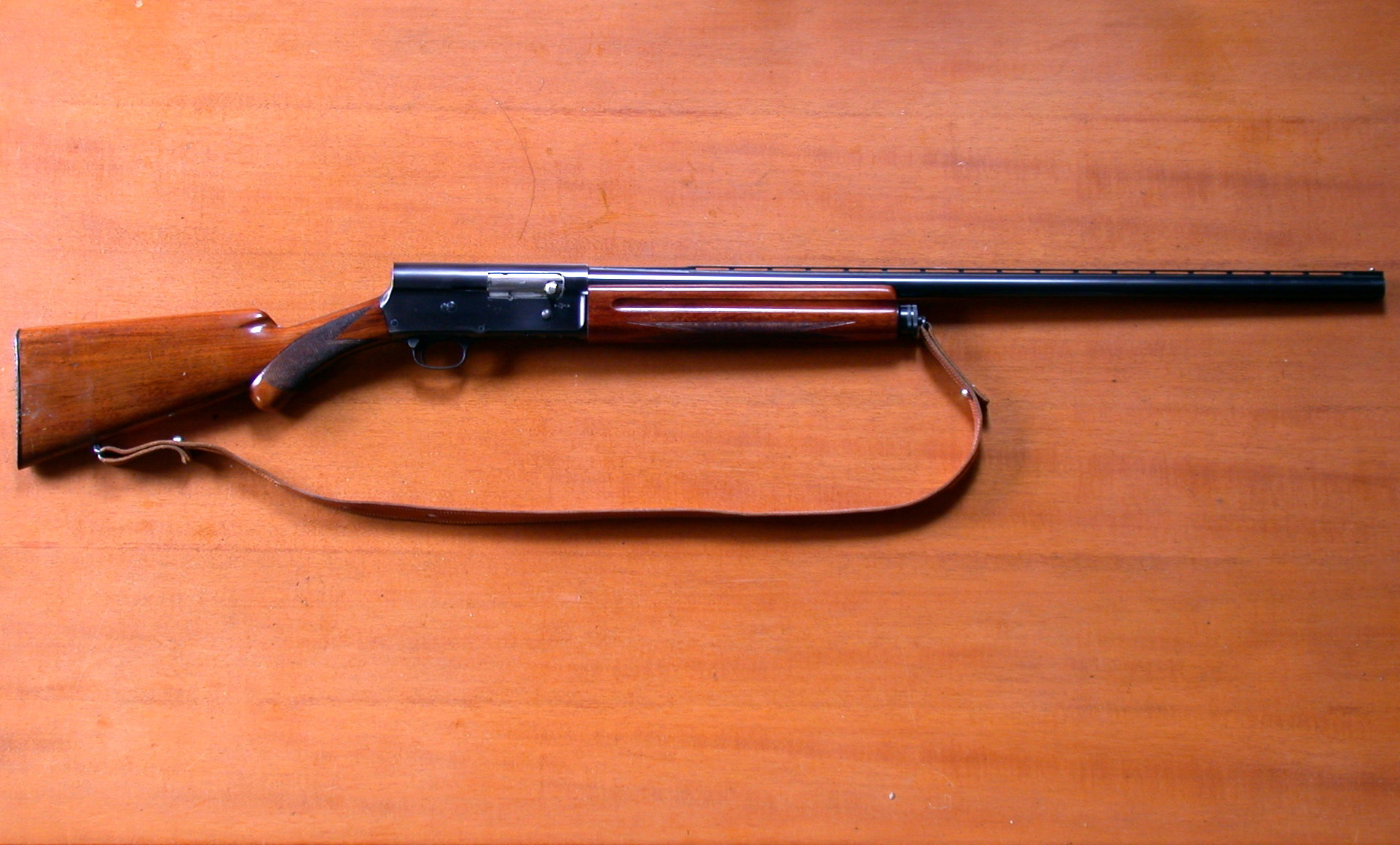
- Browning Auto-5
- Type: Semi-automatic shotgun
- Place of origin: United States/Belgium

Service history
- In service: 1905–1975
- Used by: See Users
- Wars: World War I; World War II; Malayan Emergency; Vietnam War; Rhodesian Bush War

Production history
- Designer: John Browning
- Designed: 1898
- Manufacturer: Browning Arms; Fabrique Nationale Herstal (Belgique); Remington Arms; Savage Arms; Miroku Corp.
- Produced: 1902–1998
- Variants: Remington Model 11, Remington Sportsman, Savage Model 720 and Model 745

Specifications
- Mass: 4.1 kilograms (9.0 lb)
- Length: 127 centimetres (50 in)
- Barrel length: 71.1 centimetres (28.0 in)
- Cartridge: 12 gauge, 16 gauge, 20 gauge
- Action: Semi-automatic
- Feed system: Tubular loaded; 4 +1; Other variants 2+1

The Browning Automatic 5, more commonly referred to as the Auto-5 or simply A-5, is a recoil-operated semi-automatic shotgun designed by John Browning and manufactured by Fabrique Nationale de Herstal. It was the first successful semi-automatic shotgun design, and remained in production until 1998. The name of the shotgun designates that it is an autoloader with a capacity of five rounds, four in the magazine and one in the chamber. Remington Arms and Savage Arms sold variants called the Remington Model 11 and Savage Model 720 that were nearly identical but lacked the magazine cutoff found on the Browning.

== History ==
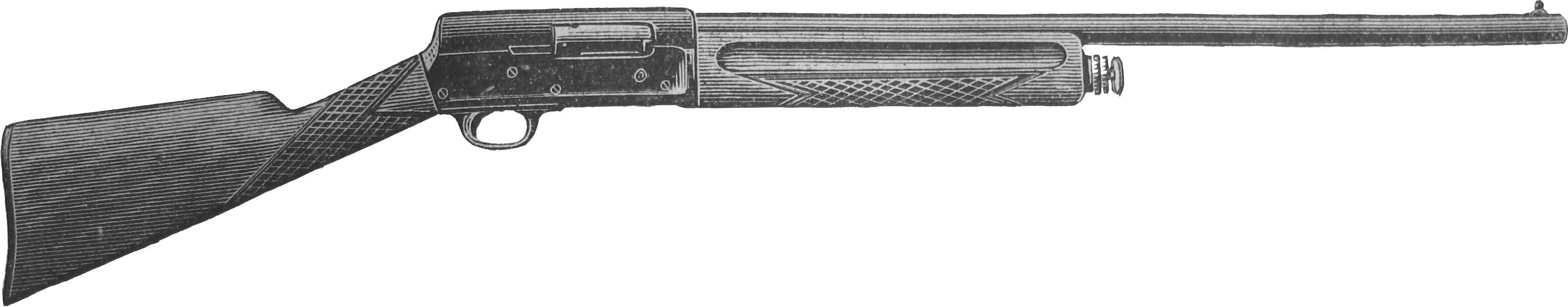
Depiction of Auto-5 in 1909 catalog

The Browning Auto-5 was the first mass-produced semi-automatic shotgun. Designed by John Browning in 1898 and patented in 1900, it was produced continually for almost 100 years by several makers with production ending in 1998. It features a distinctive high rear end, earning it the nickname "Humpback". The top of the action goes straight back on a level with the barrel before cutting down sharply towards the buttstock. This distinctive feature makes it easy to identify A-5s from a distance. A-5s were produced in a variety of gauges, with 12 and 20 predominating; 16 gauge (not produced between 1976 and 1987) models were also available. The shotgun saw military service worldwide from World War I through the Vietnam War. The weapon was used heavily by members of the Special Air Service in the Malayan Emergency, who found the semi-automatic shotgun perfect for close quarter jungle fighting. British troops utilized the unaltered Browning Auto-5 Sporter with a 28 inch barrel, supplemented by Remington 870-R slide action shotguns with 20 inch barrels. The British found that the number of semiautomatic shotguns in a patrol were directly proportional to the number of kills made when encountering a guerilla group.

Some Auto 5s were used by Marine Raiders during the famed Makin Atoll raid in August of 1942.

=== Production ===
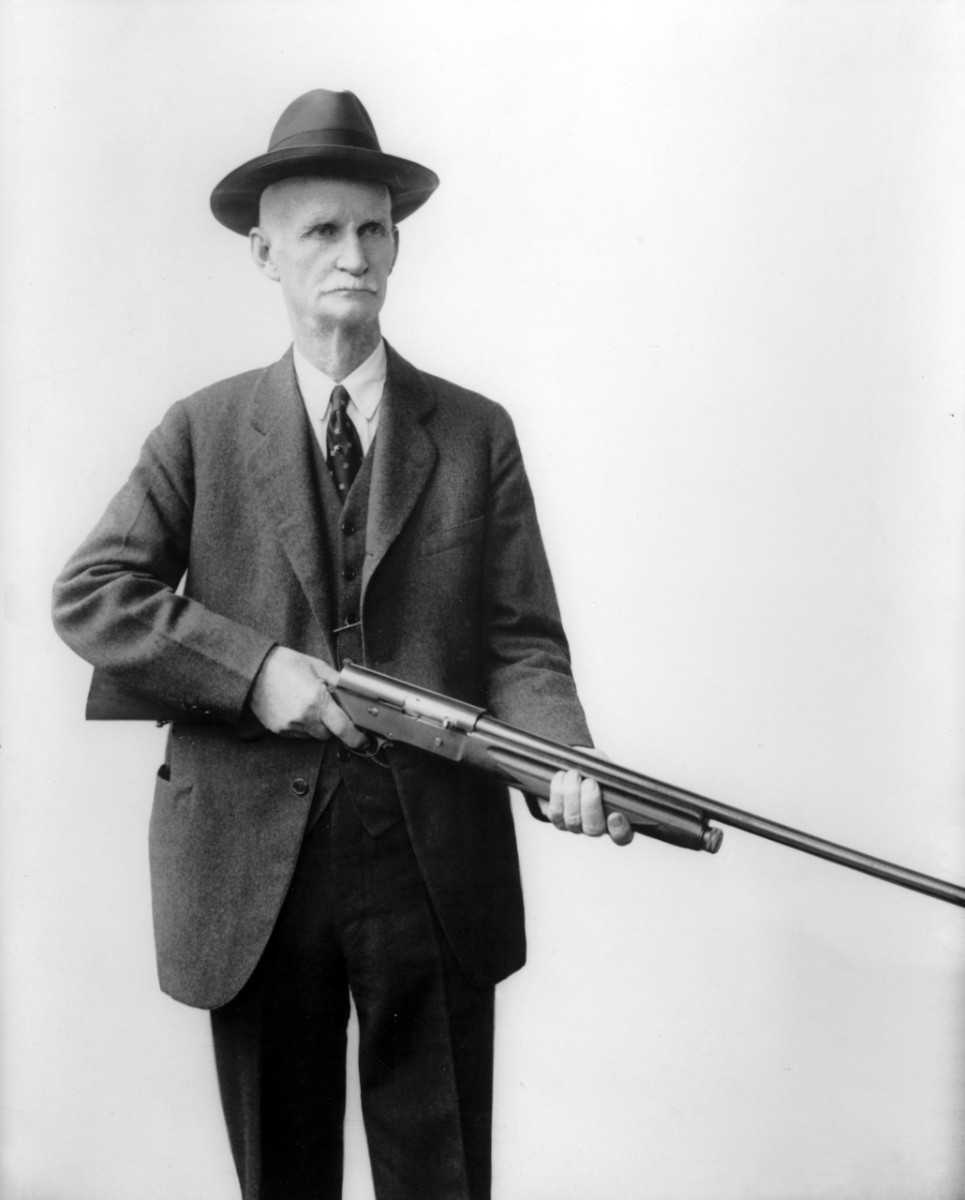
John M. Browning with his Auto-5

John Browning presented his design (which he called his best achievement) to Winchester, where he had sold most of his previous designs. However, Winchester's higher-ups, particularly Thomas Grey Bennett, were opposed to working with Browning, as they deemed Browning to have been uncooperative in creation of Winchester Model 1893's production version, and the company then needing to further redesign it into Model 1897 at high monetary cost.

As Winchester refused his terms, Browning went to Remington. However, the president of Remington died of a heart attack as Browning waited to offer them the gun. This forced Browning to look overseas to produce the shotgun. It was manufactured by Fabrique Nationale de Herstal (FN) of Belgium, a company that had already produced Browning-designed pistols, starting in 1902. Browning would later license the design to Remington, which produced it as their Model 11 (1905–1947). The Remington Model 11 was the first auto-loading shotgun made in the United States. Savage Arms also licensed the design from Browning and produced it as their model 720 from 1930 to 1949, and their model 745 with an alloy receiver and two-shot magazine from 1941 to 1949. Browning's long-recoil operated design itself served as the operating system for subsequent Remington (11-48), Savage (755, 775) and Franchi (AL-48) models.

Production of the Auto-5 in Belgium continued until the start of World War II, when Browning moved production to Remington Arms in the United States. The Auto-5 was produced by Remington alongside the Model 11 until FN could resume making the gun after the war. Unlike the Remington Model 11, the Remington-produced Browning shotguns had magazine cutoffs. Some 850,000 Remington Model 11 shotguns were produced before production ended in 1947. In 1952, production of Browning models returned to FN, where it continued until the end. However, the majority of production moved to the Japanese company Miroku in 1975. Finally, in 1998, manufacture of A-5s ceased except for a few commemorative models finished at FN in 1999. As of 1983 it was well established as the second-best-selling auto-loading shotgun in U.S. history, after the Remington 1100.

In 2014, Browning Arms released the A5, a mechanically unrelated recoil-operated shotgun with external resemblance to the Auto 5; it is manufactured in Viana, Portugal.

== Design details ==
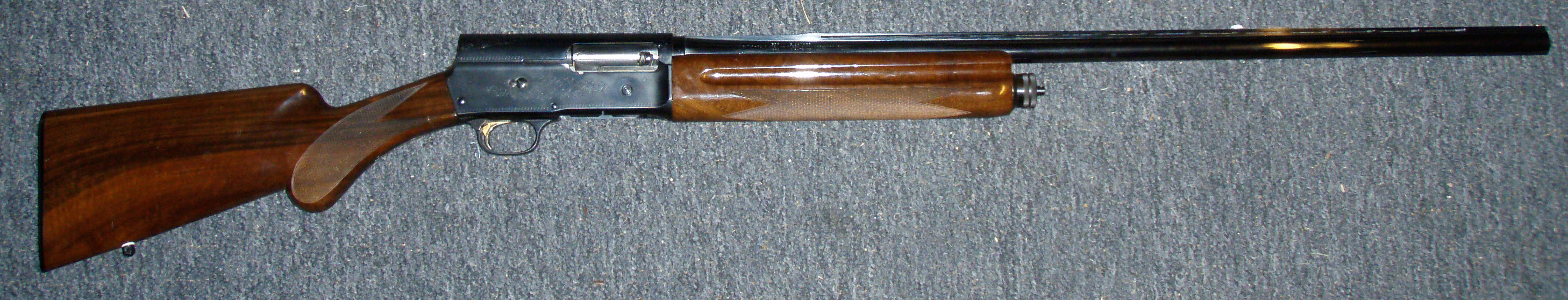
Browning Auto-5 in 20-gauge magnum (made in Japan)

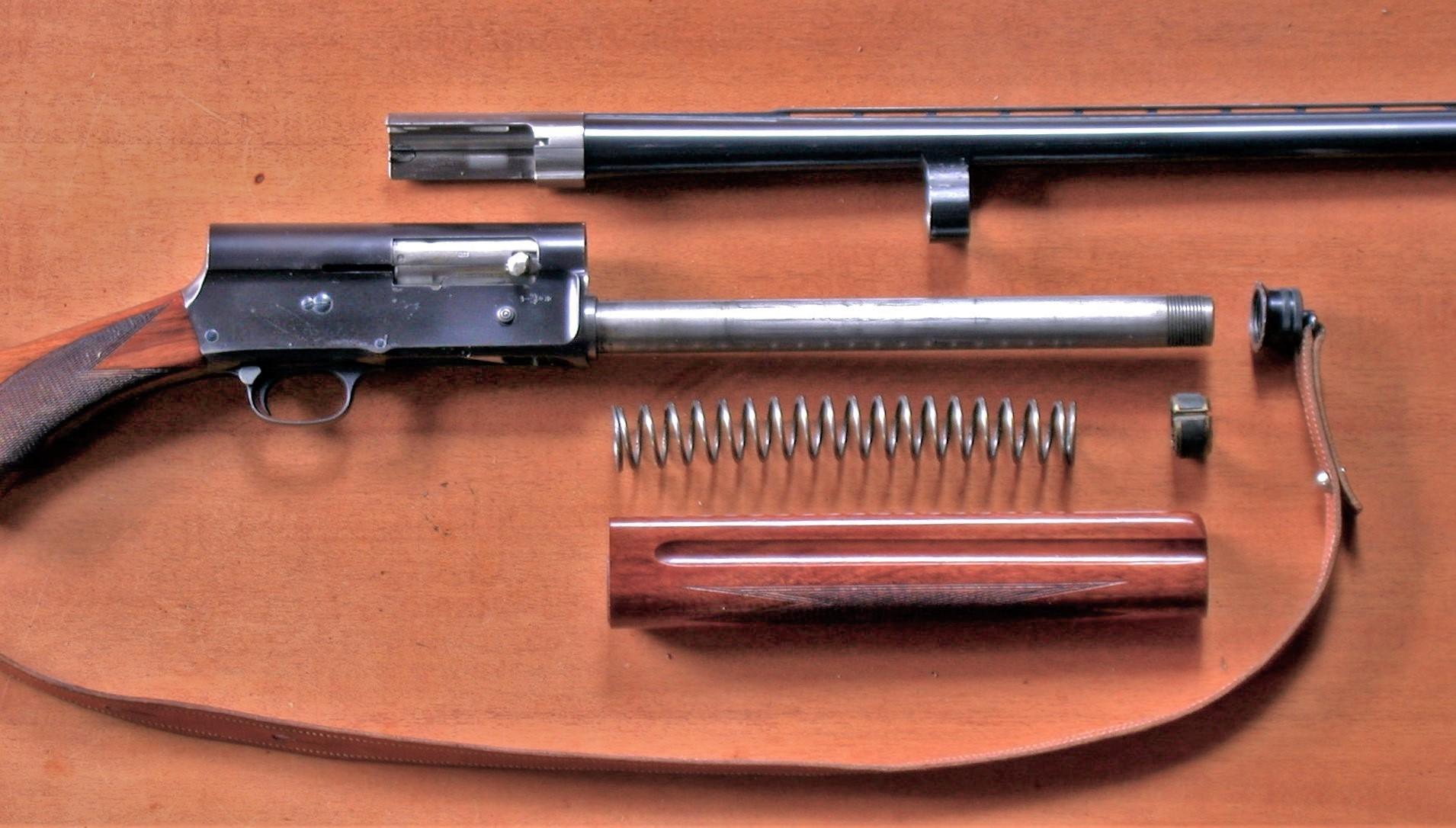
Auto-5 field stripped

The Browning Auto-5 is a long-recoil operated semi-automatic shotgun. Shells are stored in a tubular magazine under the barrel. When a chambered shell is fired, the barrel and bolt recoil together (for a distance greater than the shell length) and re-cock the hammer. As the barrel returns forward to its initial position the bolt remains behind and thus the spent shell is ejected through a port on the right-hand side of the receiver. Then the bolt returns forward and feeds another shell from the magazine into the action. This type of long recoil action was the first of its kind and patented in 1900 by John Browning.

To load the gun, shells are fed into the bottom of the action, where they are pushed into the tubular magazine. Most A-5s have removable plugs in the magazine which prevent more than three shells from being loaded (two in the magazine, plus one in the chamber) to comply with U.S. federal migratory waterfowl laws, as well as some state hunting regulations. With the plug removed, the total capacity is five rounds. If the chamber is open (the operating handle is drawn back) the first shell loaded into the magazine tube will go directly into the chamber (there is a manual bolt closing button under the ejection port), the bolt then closes, and all further shells fed into the gun go into the magazine. This function known colloquially as the Speed Load feature was not found on earlier models but was available through conversion and rebuild kits, and was introduced later on in the 1950s as a standard feature from the factory.

The Auto-5 has a system of bevel rings and a friction piece or pieces, which retard the barrel's rearward travel. Setting these rings correctly is vital to good shotgun performance and to ensure a long life to the weapon, by controlling excessive recoil. The friction rings are set based on the type of load to be fired through the gun. Different settings are found in the owner's manual.

There is a sixteen gauge variant with the name, "Sweet Sixteen". This model is no longer in production.

== Users ==
- Cuba
- Kingdom of Italy
- Japan – copies made by Kawaguchiya and later Miroku
- Malaysia
- Philippines
- Rhodesia
- Russian Empire: Several shotguns were imported from Belgium and sold before the outbreak of the First World War
- United Kingdom: Formally adopted in November 1965, used in tropical conditions and for explosive ordnance disposal work.
- United States: A few Remington Model 11 shotguns were issued during World War I. 60,000 Remington Model 11 shotguns were bought in World War II; these weapons were used as training guns for navy aerial gunners and as riot guns.
  - Vernon Police Department, California – Remington Model 11
