= Beretta AL391 =

- Type: Shotgun
- Place of origin: Italy

Production history
- Manufacturer: Beretta
- Produced: 1999–present
- Variants: AL391 Urika; AL391 Teknys; A391 Xtrema

Specifications
- Mass: 7.3 pounds (12 gauge Urika)
- Length: 51 inches (28-inch barrel)
- Barrel length: 32, 30, 28, 26, or 24 inches
- Caliber: 12 or 20 gauge
- Action: Semi-automatic

The Beretta AL391 is a semi-automatic shotgun. It is manufactured, marketed, and distributed by Fabbrica d'Armi Pietro Beretta, in Gardone Val Trompia, Italy.

The AL391 is most often used for hunting birds, and for clay target games such as trap and skeet. There are several different models, each with multiple variations. The AL391 is chambered in either 12 gauge or 20 gauge.

== Features ==
The Beretta AL391 is mechanically similar to its predecessor, the AL390, but has a slimmer fore-end and a different shaped stock. It has an aluminum receiver, which reduces the weight of the gun. The magazine holds three rounds, providing a total capacity of four rounds, which can be reduced using a magazine plug. The gun has a magazine cut-off, which can be engaged to remove or replace a chambered shell without feeding a new round from the magazine.

The AL391 has a self-compensating gas-driven recoil system. This lacks the mechanical simplicity of some other recoil systems. However, it provides the advantage of automatically adjusting for shot shells with different charges and therefore different amounts of recoil. It is designed to cycle the action reliably when using a wide variety of shells, while minimizing felt recoil.

== Models ==
- AL391 Urika: The standard model, available with a variety of features and finishes.
- AL391 Teknys: A more upscale version of the Urika, with upgraded finishing and fancier engraving.
- A391 Xtrema: Designed for hunting waterfowl, the Xtrema accepts shells up to 3½-inch magnums and has been produced in 12 gauge only.

== See also ==
- Beretta Xtrema 2
