= Semi-automatic shotgun =

Repeating shotgun with a semi-automatic action

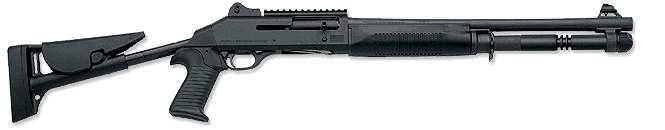
Benelli M1014 semi-automatic shotgun

A semi-automatic shotgun is a repeating shotgun with a semi-automatic action, i.e. capable of automatically chambering a new shell after each firing, but requires individual trigger-pull to manually actuate each shot. Semi-automatic shotguns use gas operation, blowback, or recoil operation to cycle the action, eject the empty shell, and load another round. The first semi-automatic shotgun was the Automatic-5 by Browning.

Many semi-automatic shotguns also provide an optional manual means of operation such as by pump action or a charging handle.

== Examples ==
Notable semi-automatic shotguns include:

- Akdal MKA 1919
- Baikal MP-153
- Benelli M1014
- Beretta 1301
- Beretta AL391
- Beretta Xtrema 2
- Browning Auto-5
- Daewoo USAS-12
- Franchi Special Purpose Shotgun 12
- Franchi SPAS-15
- High Standard Model 10
- Ithaca Mag-10
- IWI Tavor TS12
- Mossberg 9200
- Mossberg 930
- Remington Model 1100
- Remington Model 11-87
- Remington Model SP-10
- Saiga-12 ("Сайга-12")
- Sjögren shotgun
- Smith & Wesson Model 1000
- SRM Arms Model 1216
- Vepr-12
- Walther interbellum semi-automatic

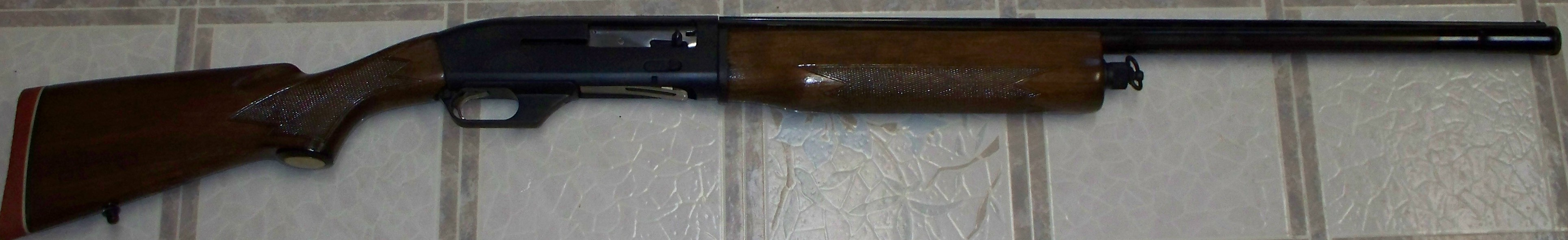
An Ithaca Mag-10 shotgun

== See also ==
- List of shotguns
- List of semi-automatic shotguns
- Assault weapon
- Automatic shotgun
- Personal defense weapon
- Semi-automatic firearm
