= Recoil operation =

Type of firearm action

The difference between recoil operation (lower left) and blowback (upper left).

Recoil operation is an operating mechanism used to implement locked-breech autoloading firearms. Recoil operated firearms use the energy of recoil to cycle the action, as opposed to gas operation or blowback operation using the pressure of the propellant gas.

== History ==
The earliest mention of recoil used to assist the loading of firearms is sometimes claimed to be in 1663 when an Englishman called Palmer proposed to employ either it or gases tapped along a barrel to do so. However no one has been able to verify this claim in recent times, although there is another automatic gun that dates from the same year, but its type and method of operation are unknown.

Recoil-operation, if it was invented in 1663, would then lie dormant until the 19th century, when a number of inventors started to patent designs featuring recoil operation; this was due to the fact that the integrated disposable cartridge (both bullet and propellant in one easily interchangeable unit) made these designs viable. The earliest mention of recoil operation in the British patent literature is a patent by Joseph Whitworth filed in 1855 which proposed to use recoil to partially open the breech of a rifle, the breech then being manually pulled the rest of the way back by hand.

Around this time, an American by the name of Regulus Pilon is sometimes stated to have patented in Britain a gun that used a limited form of recoil operation. He had three British patents related to firearms around the 1850s to the 1860s; however, all of them refer to a means of dampening recoil in firearms, which wasn't a new idea at the time, rather than true recoil operation. The next to mention recoil operation in the British patent literature is by Alexander Blakely in 1862, who clearly describes using the recoil of a fired cannon to open the breech.

In 1864 after the Second Schleswig War, Denmark started a program intended to develop a gun that used the recoil of a fired shot to reload the firearm, though a working model would not be produced until 1888. Later in the 1870s, a Swedish captain called D. H. Friberg patented a design which introduced both flapper-locking and the fully automatic recoil operated machine gun. Furthermore, in 1875 a means of cocking a rifle through recoil was patented by a German called Otto Emmerich. Finally came Hiram Maxim's 1883 fully automatic recoil operated "Maxim gun", which introduced the modern age of automatic machine guns.

== Design ==
External videos
- ANIMATION Browning AUTO 5 "cycle of one shoot", YouTube

The same forces that cause the ejecta of a firearm (the projectile(s), propellant gas, wad, sabot, etc.) to move down the barrel also cause all or a portion of the firearm to move in the opposite direction. The result is required by the conservation of momentum such that the ejecta momentum and recoiling momentum are equal. These momenta are calculated by:

Ejecta mass × ejecta velocity = recoiling mass × recoil velocity

The barrel is a moving part of the action in recoil-operated firearms. In non-recoil-operated firearms, it is generally the entire firearm that recoils. However, in recoil-operated firearms, only a portion of the firearm recoils while inertia holds another portion motionless relative to a mass such as the ground, a ship's gun mount, or a human holding the firearm. The moving and the motionless masses are coupled by a spring that absorbs the recoil energy as it is compressed by the movement and then expands providing energy for the rest of the operating cycle.

Since there is a minimum momentum required to operate a recoil-operated firearm's action, the cartridge must generate sufficient recoil to provide that momentum. Therefore, recoil-operated firearms work best with a cartridge that yields a momentum approximately equal to that for which the mechanism was optimized. For example, the M1911 design with factory springs is optimized for a 230-grain (15 g) bullet at factory velocity. Changes in caliber or drastic changes in bullet weight and/or velocity require modifications to spring weight or slide mass to compensate. Similarly the use of blank ammunition will typically cause the mechanism not to work correctly, unless a device is fitted to boost the recoil.

== Categories ==
Recoil-operated designs are broadly categorized by how the parts move under recoil.

=== Long recoil ===
Key for recoil operation diagrams. Gun fires to the right.

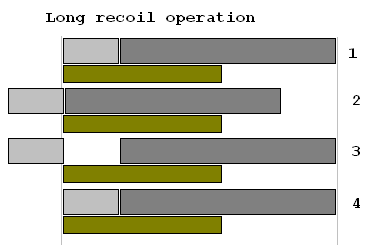
Block diagram of long recoil operation cycle.

Long recoil operation is found primarily in shotguns, particularly ones based on John Browning's Auto-5 action. In 1885 a locked breech, long recoil action was patented by the Britons Schlund and Arthur. In a long recoil action, the barrel and bolt remain locked together during recoil, compressing the recoil springs. Following this rearward movement, the bolt locks to the rear and the barrel is forced forward by its spring. The bolt is held in position until the barrel returns completely forward during which time the spent cartridge has been extracted and ejected, and a new shell has been positioned from the magazine. The bolt is released and forced closed by its recoil spring, chambering a fresh round.

The long recoil system was invented in the late 19th century and dominated the automatic shotgun market for more than half that century before it was supplanted by new gas-operated designs. While Browning halted production of the Auto-5 design in 1999, Franchi still makes a long-recoil–operated shotgun line, the AL-48, which shares both the original Browning action design, and the "humpbacked" appearance of the original Auto-5. Other weapons based on the Browning system were the Remington Model 8 semi-automatic rifle (1906), the Remington Model 11 & "The Sportsman" model (a model 11 with only a two-shell magazine) shotguns, the Frommer Stop line of pistols (1907), and the Chauchat automatic rifle (1915).

Cycle diagram explanation

1. Ready to fire position. Bolt is locked to barrel, both are fully forward.
2. Recoil of firing forces bolt and barrel fully to the rear, compressing the return springs for both.
3. Bolt is held to rear, while barrel unlocks and returns to battery under spring force. Fired round is ejected.
4. Bolt returns under spring force, loads new round. Barrel locks in place as it returns to battery.

=== Short recoil ===
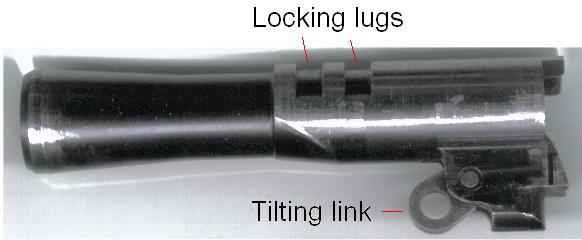
The barrel from a Para Ordnance P12.45, an M1911-derived design which uses short recoil operation. Under recoil, the barrel moves back in the frame, rotating the link (shown in the unlocked position), which causes the rear of the barrel to tip down and disengage from the slide.

The short recoil action dominates the world of centerfire semi-automatic pistols, being found in nearly all weapons chambered for high-pressure pistol cartridges of 9×19mm Parabellum and larger, while low-pressure pistol cartridges of .380 ACP and smaller generally use the blowback method of operation. Short recoil operation differs from long recoil operation in that the barrel and bolt recoil together only a short distance before they unlock and separate. The barrel stops quickly, and the bolt continues rearward, compressing the recoil spring and performing the automated extraction and feeding process. During the last portion of its forward travel, the bolt locks into the barrel and pushes the barrel back into battery.

The method of locking and unlocking the barrel differentiates the wide array of short recoil designs. Most common are the John Browning tilting barrel designs based on either the swinging link and locking lugs as used in the M1911 pistol or the linkless cam design used in the Hi Power and CZ 75. Other designs are the locking block design found in the Walther P38 and Beretta 92, rollers in the MG42, or a rotating barrel used in the Beretta 8000 and others. An unusual variant is the toggle bolt design of the Borchardt C-93 and its descendant, the Luger pistol.

While the short recoil design is most common in pistols, the very first short-recoil–operated firearm was also the first machine gun, the Maxim gun. It used a toggle bolt similar to the one Borchardt later adapted to pistols. Vladimirov also used the short recoil principle in the Soviet KPV-14.5 heavy machine gun which has been in service with the Russian military and Middle Eastern armed forces since 1949. Melvin Johnson also used the short recoil principle in his M1941 Johnson machine gun and M1941 rifle, other rifles using short recoil are LWRCI SMG 45 and LoneStar Future Weapons RM-277R.

Cycle diagram explanation

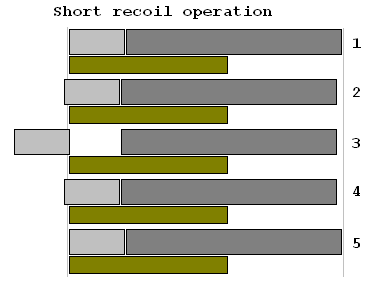
Block diagram of short recoil operation cycle. See diagram key above.

1. Ready to fire position. Bolt is locked to barrel, both are fully forward.
2. Upon firing, bolt and barrel recoil backwards a short distance while locked together. Near the end of the barrel travel, the bolt and barrel unlock.
3. The barrel stops, but the unlocked bolt continues to move to the rear, ejecting the empty shell and compressing the recoil spring.
4. The bolt returns forward under spring force, loading a new round into the barrel.
5. Bolt locks into barrel, and forces barrel to return to battery.

=== Inertia ===
Inertia-actuated unlocking

An alternative design concept for recoil-operated firearms is the inertia operated system, the first practical use of it being the Sjögren shotgun, developed by Carl Axel Theodor Sjögren in the early 1900s, a Swedish engineer who was awarded a number of patents for his inertia operated design between 1900 and 1908 and sold about 5,000 automatic shotguns using the system in 1908–1909. In a reversal of the other designs, some inertia systems use nearly the entire firearm as the recoiling component, with only the bolt remaining stationary during firing. Because of this, the inertia system is only applied to heavily recoiling firearms, particularly shotguns. A similar system using inertia operation was then developed by Paolo Benelli in the early 1980s and patented in 1986. With the exception of Sjögren's shotguns and rifles in the early 1900s, all inertia-operated firearms made until 2012 were either made by Benelli or used a design licensed from Benelli, such as the Franchi Affinity. Then the Browning Arms Company introduced the inertia-operated A5 (trademarked as Kinematic Drive) as successor to the long-recoil operated Auto-5. Both the Benelli and Browning systems are based on a rotating locking bolt, similar to that used in many gas-operated firearms.

Before firing, the bolt body is separated from the locked bolt head by a stiff spring. As the shotgun recoils after firing, inertia of the bolt body is large enough for it to remain stationary while the recoiling gun and locked bolt head move rearward. This movement compresses the spring between the bolt head and bolt body, storing the energy required to cycle the action. Since the spring can only be compressed a certain amount, this limits the amount of force the spring can absorb, and provides an inherent level of self-regulation to the action, allowing a wide range of shotshells to be used, from standard to magnum loads, as long as they provide the minimum recoil level to compress the spring. Note that the shotgun must be free to recoil for this to work—the compressibility of the shooter's body is sufficient to allow this movement, but firing the shotgun from a secure position in a rest or with the stock against the ground will not allow it to recoil sufficiently to operate the mechanism. Likewise, care must be exercised when modifying weapons of this type (e.g. addition of extended magazines or ammunition storage on the stock), as any sizable increase in weapon mass can reduce the work done from recoil below that required to cycle the action.

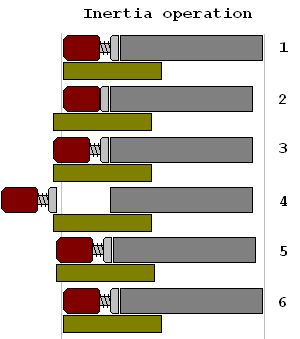
Block diagram of inertia operation cycle, see diagram key above

As the recoil spring returns to its uncompressed state, it pushes the bolt body backward with sufficient force to cycle the action. The bolt body unlocks and retracts the bolt head, extracts and ejects the cartridge, cocks the hammer, and compresses the return spring. Once the bolt reaches the end of its travel, the return spring provides the force to chamber the next round from the magazine, and lock the bolt closed.

Cycle diagram explanation

1. Ready to fire position. Bolt is locked to barrel, both are fully forward.
2. Upon firing, the firearm recoils backwards into the shooter's body. The inertial mass remains stationary, compressing a spring. The bolt remains locked to the barrel, which in turn is rigidly attached to the frame.
3. The compressed spring forces the inertial mass rearwards until it transfers its momentum to the bolt.
4. The bolt unlocks and moves to the rear, ejecting the fired round and compressing the return spring.
5. The bolt returns to battery under spring force, loading a new round and locking into place.
6. The shooter recovers from the shot, moving the firearm forward into position for the next shot.

==== Muzzle booster ====
Some short-recoil–operated firearms, such as the German MG 42 and MG 3, use a mechanism at the muzzle to extract some energy from the escaping powder gases to push the barrel backwards, in addition to the recoil energy. This boost provides higher rates of fire and/or more reliable operation. This type of mechanism is also found in some suppressors used on short recoil firearms, under the name gas assist or Nielsen device, where it is used to compensate for the extra mass the suppressor adds to the recoiling parts both by providing a boost and decoupling some of the suppressor's mass from the firearm's recoiling parts.

Muzzle boosters are also used on some recoil-operated firearms' blank-firing attachments to normalize the recoil force of a blank round (with no projectile) with the greater force of a live round, in order to allow the mechanism to cycle properly.

==== Automatic revolvers ====
Several revolvers use recoil to cock the hammer and advance the cylinder. In these designs, the barrel and cylinder are affixed to an upper frame which recoils atop a sub-frame. As the upper receiver recoils, the cylinder is advanced and hammer cocked, functions that are usually done manually. Notable examples are the Webley–Fosbery and Mateba.

== Cartridge short-recoil operation ==
Hesitation-locked delayed blowback operation with rotating bolt.

An unusual operation, the cartridge short-recoil operation (not to be confused with recoil operation as it uses a fixed barrel) that works when firing, the cartridge sets back a short distance of 1.1-1.5mm to a stop and the bolt carrier continues to recoil due to inertia, unlocking the rotating bolt. It is similar to Hesitation actuated unlocking. The 701 rifle is an example that used this operation.

== Other autoloading systems ==
Other autoloading systems are:

- Delayed blowback firearms uses an operation that delays the bolt opening until the gas pressure is at a safe level to extract.
- Blow forward firearms lack the use of a bolt but instead a moving barrel that gets dragged forward by the bullet until it leaves the barrel to cycle its action.
- Blowback firearms use the expanding gas impinging on the cartridge itself to push the bolt of the firearm rearward.
- Gas-operated firearms tap off a small amount of the expanding gas to power the moving parts of the action.

== See also ==
- Bump stock
- Slamfire

== Bibliography ==
- Army Materiel Command (February 5, 1970), Automatic Weapons, Engineering Design Handbook: Guns Series, United States Army Materiel Command, AMCP 706-260, archived from the original on April 8, 2013
