= List of firearms (B) =

This is a list of small arms—including pistols, shotguns, sniper rifles, submachine guns, personal defense weapons, assault rifles, battle rifles, designated marksman rifles, carbines, machine guns, flamethrowers, multiple-barrel firearms, grenade launchers, and anti-tank rifles—that includes variants.

== List ==
- Baikal
- Pistols
- Baikal-441 (Soviet Union - Semi-Automatic Pistol - .25ACP: Civilian market PSM pistol)
- Baikal-442 (Soviet Union - Semi-Automatic Pistol - 9×18mm: Civilian market Makarov PM)
- Baikal MCM (Soviet Union - Semi-Automatic Pistol - .22 LR)
- Rifles
- Baikal MP-141K (Russia - Semi-Auto Carbine - .22 LR, .22 Magnum)
- Shotguns
- Baikal MP-153(Russia - Semi-Automatic Shotgun - 12 Gauge)
- Bajouzutsu revolver
- Baksan PDW (Russia - Personal Defence Weapon - 9×18mm High Impulse)
- Bang M1922 rifle(US, Denmark - Semi-Automatic Rifle - 6.5mm Krag, .30-'06 Springfield)
- Barrett Firearms Manufacturing
- Machine Guns
- Barrett M240LW(US - General-Purpose Machine Gun - 7.62×51mm NATO)
- Rifles
- Barrett M82(US -Semi-Automatic Anti-Materiel Rifle - .50 BMG)
- Barrett M82A1 (US - Semi-Automatic Anti-Materiel Rifle - .50 BMG)
- Barrett M82A1A(US - Semi-Automatic Anti-Materiel Rifle - .50 BMG)
- Barrett M82A1M/M107(US - Semi-Automatic Anti-Materiel Rifle - .50 BMG)
- Barrett M107A1(US - Semi-Automatic Anti-Materiel Rifle - .50 BMG)
- Barrett M107CQ(US - Semi-Automatic Anti-Materiel Rifle - .50 BMG)
- Barrett XM109(US - Semi-Automatic Anti-Materiel Rifle - 25×59mm)
- Barrett M82A2 (US - Semi-Automatic Anti-Materiel Rifle - .50 BMG)
- Barrett M82A3 (US - Semi-Automatic Anti-Materiel Rifle - .50 BMG)
- Barrett M90(US - Bolt-Action Anti-Materiel Rifle - .50 BMG)
- Barrett M95(US - Bolt-Action Anti-Materiel Rifle - .50 BMG)
- Barrett M98(US -Semi-Automatic Sniper Rifle- .338 Lapua Magnum:Prototype)
- Barrett M98B(US - Bolt-Action Sniper Rifle - .338 Lapua Magnum)
- Barrett MRAD(US - Bolt-Action Sniper Rifle - .338 Lapua Magnum)
- Barrett MRAD PSR (US - Bolt-Action Sniper Rifle - .338 Lapua Magnum)
- Barrett M99(US -Bolt-Action Anti-Materiel Rifle- .416 Barrett, .50 BMG)
- Barrett M468(US - Semi-Automatic Rifle - 6.8×43mm SPC)
- Barrett M468A1 (US - Semi-Automatic Rifle - 6.8×43mm SPC)
- Barrett REC7(US - Semi-Automatic Rifle - 5.56×45mm NATO, 6.8×43mm SPC)
- Barrett XM500(US -Bolt-Action Anti-Materiel Rifle- .50 BMG)
- Bataan Modelo 71(Argentina - Pump-Action Shotgun - 12 Gauge: Ithaca 37 copy)
- Bauer Automatic(US - Semi-Automatic Pistol - .25 ACP: Baby Browning Copy)
- BCM Europearms Barrel Block
- BCM Europearms Bench Rest
- BCM Europearms Extreme
- BCM Europearms Extreme M.A.R.R.
- BCM Europearms Extreme STD
- BCM Europearms F-Class Open
- BCM Europearms F-Class TR
- BCM Europearms Hunter Bench Rest
- BCM Europearms Hunter Match
- BCM Europearms Hunter Field
- BCM Europearms M.A.R.R.
- BCM Europearms SLR
- BCM Europearms TMR
- BCM Europearms USR
- Beaumont M1871 (Dutch - Bolt-Action Rifle—11.3x51R)
- Beholla Pistol (German Empire - Semi-Automatic Pistol - .32 ACP)
- Belgian M1871 Trooper's Revolver (Belgium - Revolver - 11×17.5mm French Ordnance)
- Belgian M1878 Officer's Revolver (Belgium - Revolver - 9×23mmR Nagant)
- Belgian M1883 NCO's Revolver (Belgium - Revolver - 9×23mmR Nagant)
- Bendix Hyde carbine(US - Carbine - .30 Carbine)
- Benelli
  - Pistols
- Benelli B76(Italy - Semi-Automatic Pistol - 7.65×21mm Parabellum, 9×18mm Ultra, 9×19mm Parabellum)
- Benelli B82(Italy -Semi-Automatic Pistol - 7.65×21mm Parabellum, 9×18mm Ultra, 9×19mm Parabellum)
- Benelli B82 Sport(Italy - Semi-Automatic Pistol - 7.65×21mm Parabellum)
- Shotguns
- Benelli Córdoba(Italy - Semi-Automatic Shotgun - 12 Gauge, 20 Gauge)
- Benelli Legacy (Italy - Semi-Automatic Shotgun - 12 Gauge, 20 Gauge, 28 Gauge)
- Benelli M1 (Italy - Semi-Automatic Shotgun - 12 Gauge)
- Benelli M1 Entry Gun(Italy - Semi-Automatic Shotgun - 12 Gauge)
- Benelli M1 Super 90(Italy - Semi-Automatic Shotgun - 12 Gauge)
- Benelli M1 Super 90 Field (Italy - Semi-Automatic Shotgun - 12 Gauge)
- Benelli M1 Tactical(Italy - Semi-Automatic Shotgun - 12 Gauge)
- Benelli M3 (Italy - Semi-Automatic/Pump-Action Shotgun - 12 Gauge)
- Benelli M3 Super 90(Italy - Semi-Automatic/Pump-Action Shotgun - 12 Gauge)
- Benelli M3T(Italy -Semi-Automatic/Pump-Action Shotgun - 12 Gauge)
- Benelli M4 Super 90(Italy - Semi-Automatic Shotgun - 12 Gauge)
- Benelli Montefeltro(Italy - Semi-Automatic Shotgun - 12 Gauge, 20 Gauge)
- Benelli Centro(Italy - Semi-Automatic Shotgun - 12 Gauge, 20 Gauge)
- Benelli Nova(Italy -Pump-Action Shotgun- 12 Gauge,20 Gauge)
- Benelli Raffaello(Italy - Semi-Automatic Shotgun - 12 Gauge)
- Benelli Super Black Eagle (Italy - Semi-Automamtic Shotgun - 12 Gauge)
- Benelli Supernova(Italy - Pump-Action Shotgun - 12 Gauge)
- Benelli Ultra Lite (Italy - Semi-Automatic Shotgun - 12 Gauge)
- Benelli Vinci (Italy - Semi-Automatic Shotgun - 12 Gauge)
- Berdan rifle (US/Russia - Single-Shot Rifle - 7.62×54mmR, 10.75×58 mmR, .42 Berdan)
- Berdan I (US/Russia -Single-Shot Rifle- 7.62×54mmR,10.75×58 mmR,.42 Berdan)
- Berdan II (US/Russia - Single-Shot Rifle - 7.62×54mmR, 10.75×58 mmR, .42 Berdan)
- Beretta
  - Machine Guns
    - AR70/78 (Italy - Light Machine Gun - 5.56×45mm NATO)
    - AR70/84 (Italy - Light Machine Gun - 5.56×45mm NATO)
    - AS70/90 (Italy - Light Machine Gun - 5.56×45mm NATO)
    - MG42/59 (Italy - General-Purpose Machine Gun - 7.62×51mm NATO: Licensed Production Rheinmetall MG1A2)
  - Pistols
- Beretta 20 Bobcat (Italy, US - Subcompact Semi-Automatic Pistol - .25 ACP)
- Beretta 21A Bobcat (Italy, US - Subcompact Semi-Automatic Pistol - .22 LR, .25 ACP)
- Beretta 81 Series
- Beretta 81B Cheetah(Italy - Compact Semi-Automatic Pistol - .32 ACP)
- Beretta 81FS Cheetah(Italy - Compact Semi-Automatic Pistol - .32 ACP)
- Beretta 82 Cheetah(Italy - Compact Semi-Automatic Pistol - .32 ACP)
- Beretta 82B Cheetah(Italy - Compact Semi-Automatic Pistol - .32 ACP)
- Beretta 83 Cheetah(Italy - Compact Semi-Automatic Pistol - .380 ACP)
- Beretta 83F Cheetah(Italy - Compact Semi-Automatic Pistol - .380 ACP)
- Beretta 83FS Cheetah (Italy - Compact Semi-Automatic Pistol - .380 ACP)
- Beretta 84 Cheetah (Italy - Compact Semi-Automatic Pistol - .380 ACP)
- Beretta 84B Cheetah(Italy - Compact Semi-Automatic Pistol - .380 ACP)
- Beretta 84BB Cheetah(Italy - Compact Semi-Automatic Pistol - .380 ACP)
- Beretta 84F Cheetah(Italy - Compact Semi-Automatic Pistol - .380 ACP)
- Beretta 84FS Cheetah (Italy - Compact Semi-Automatic Pistol - .380 ACP)
- Beretta 85 Cheetah(Italy - Compact Semi-Automatic Pistol - .380 ACP)
- Beretta 85B Cheetah(Italy - Compact Semi-Automatic Pistol - .380 ACP)
- Beretta 85BB Cheetah(Italy - Compact Semi-Automatic Pistol - .380 ACP)
- Beretta 85F Cheetah (Italy - Compact Semi-Automatic Pistol - .380 ACP)
- Beretta 85FS Cheetah(Italy - Compact Semi-Automatic Pistol - .380 ACP)
- Beretta 86 Cheetah (Italy - Compact Semi-Automatic Pistol - .380 ACP)
- Beretta 86FS Cheetah(Italy - Compact Semi-Automatic Pistol - .380 ACP)
- Beretta 87 Cheetah (Italy - Compact Semi-Automatic Pistol - .22 LR)
- Beretta 87LB Cheetah(Italy - Compact Semi-Automatic Pistol - .22 LR)
- Beretta 87BB Cheetah(Italy - Compact Semi-Automatic Pistol - .22 LR)
- Beretta 87BB/LB Cheetah(Italy - Compact Semi-Automatic Pistol - .22 LR)
- Beretta 89 (Italy - Compact Semi-Automatic Pistol - .22 LR)
- Beretta 92 (Italy - Semi-Automatic Pistol - 9×19mm Parabellum)
- Beretta 92A1(Italy - Semi-Automatic Pistol - 9×19mm Parabellum)
- Beretta 92CB(Italy - Semi-Automatic Pistol - 9×19mm Parabellum)
- Beretta 92D(Italy - Semi-Automatic Pistol - 9×19mm Parabellum)
- Beretta 92DS(Italy - Semi-Automatic Pistol - 9×19mm Parabellum)
- Beretta 92D Brigadier (Italy - Semi-Automatic Pistol - 9×19mm Parabellum)
- Beretta 92D Compact L (Italy - Compact Semi-Automatic Pistol - 9×19mm Parabellum)
- Beretta 92D Vertec (Italy - Semi-Automatic Pistol - 9×19mm Parabellum)
- Beretta 92F / 92FS (Italy - Semi-Automatic Pistol - 9×19mm Parabellum)
- M9 Pistol(Italy/US - Semi-Automatic Pistol 9×19mm Parabellum)
- Beretta 92FS Brigadier (Italy - Semi-Automatic Pistol - 9×19mm Parabellum)
- Beretta 92FS Centurion (Italy - Semi-Automatic Pistol - 9×19mm Parabellum)
- Beretta 92FS Compact L (Italy - Compact Semi-Automatic Pistol - 9×19mm Parabellum)
- Beretta 92FS Compact Type M (Italy - Compact Semi-Automatic Pistol - 9×19mm Parabellum)
- Beretta 92FS Competition (Italy - Semi-Automatic Pistol - 9×19mm Parabellum)
- Beretta 92FS Target (Italy - Semi-Automatic Pistol - 9×19mm Parabellum)
- Beretta 92FS Vertec (Italy - Semi-Automatic Pistol - 9×19mm Parabellum)
- GIAT PAMAS-G1(France, Italy - Semi-Automatic Pistol- 9×19mm Parabellum)
- Beretta 92G (Italy - Semi-Automatic Pistol - 9×19mm Parabellum)
- Beretta 92G Centurion(Italy - Semi-Automatic Pistol - 9×19mm Parabellum)
- Beretta 92G Elite I(Italy - Semi-Automatic Pistol - 9×19mm Parabellum)
- Beretta 92G Elite IA(Italy - Semi-Automatic Pistol - 9×19mm Parabellum)
- Beretta 92G Elite II(Italy - Semi-Automatic Pistol - 9×19mm Parabellum)
- Beretta 92G-SD(Italy - Semi-Automatic Pistol - 9×19mm Parabellum)
- Beretta 92G Vertec(Italy - Semi-Automatic Pistol - 9×19mm Parabellum)
- Beretta 92S (Italy - Semi-Automatic Pistol - 9×19mm Parabellum)
- Beretta 92SB(Italy - Semi-Automatic Pistol - 9×19mm Parabellum)
- Beretta 92SB Compact(Italy - Compact Semi-Automatic Pistol - 9×19mm Parabellum)
- Beretta 92SB-F (Italy - Semi-Automatic Pistol - 9×19mm Parabellum)
- Beretta 92 Billennium (Italy - Semi-Automatic Pistol - 9×19mm Parabellum)
- Beretta 92 Combat (Italy - Semi-Automatic Pistol - 9×19mm Parabellum)
- Beretta 92 Stock(Italy - Semi-Automatic Pistol - 9×19mm Parabellum)
- Beretta 93R(Italy - Machine Pistol - 9×19mm Parabellum)
- Beretta 96(Italy - Semi-Automatic Pistol - .40 S&W)
- Beretta 96D(Italy - Semi-Automatic Pistol - .40 S&W)
- Beretta 96DS (Italy - Semi-Automatic Pistol - .40 S&W)
- Beretta 96D Brigadier (Italy - Semi-Automatic Pistol - .40 S&W)
- Beretta 96D Vertec(Italy - Semi-Automatic Pistol - .40 S&W)
- Beretta 96G(Italy - Semi-Automatic Pistol - .40 S&W)
- Beretta 96G-SD(Italy - Semi-Automatic Pistol - .40 S&W)
- Beretta 96G Elite (Italy - Semi-Automatic Pistol - .40 S&W)
- Beretta 96G Elite I (Italy- Semi-Automatic Pistol - .40 S&W)
- Beretta 96G Elite IA (Italy - Semi-Automatic Pistol - .40 S&W)
- Beretta 96G Elite II (Italy - Semi-Automatic Pistol - .40 S&W)
- Beretta 96G Vertec (Italy - Semi-Automatic Pistol - .40 S&W)
- Beretta 96 Brigadier(Italy - Semi-Automatic Pistol - .40 S&W)
- Beretta 96 Special(Italy - Semi-Automatic Pistol - .40 S&W)
- Beretta 96 Vertec (Italy - Semi-Automatic Pistol - .40 S&W)
- Beretta 98 Series
- Beretta 98 (Italy - Semi-Automatic Pistol - 7.65×21mm Parabellum)
- Beretta 98SB Compact (Italy - Compact Semi-Automatic Pistol - 7.65×21mm Parabellum)
- Beretta 98FS(Italy - Semi-Automatic Pistol - 9×21mm IMI)
- Beretta 98FS Brigadier (Italy -Semi-Automatic Pistol- 9×21mm IMI)
- Beretta 98FS Combat (Italy- Semi-Automatic Pistol- 9×21mm IMI)
- Beretta 98FS Competition (Italy - Semi-Automatic Pistol- 9×21mm IMI)
- Beretta 98FS Target (Italy - Semi-Automatic Pistol- 9×21mm IMI)
- Beretta 98G Elite II (Italy - Semi-Automatic Pistol- 9×21mm IMI)
- Beretta 98 Billennium (Italy - Semi-Automatic Pistol- 9×21mm IMI)
- Beretta 418 (Italy -Subcompact Semi-Automatic Pistol - .25 ACP)
- Beretta 318 (Italy -Subcompact Semi-Automatic Pistol - .25 ACP)
- Beretta M1920 (Italy - Subcompact Semi-Automatic Pistol - .25 ACP)
- Beretta M1926 (Italy - Subcompact Semi-Automatic Pistol - .25 ACP)
- 950 Jetfire (Italy, Brazil, US - Subcompact Semi-Automatic Pistol - .22 Short, .25 ACP)
- 950B Jetfire (Italy, Brazil, US - Subcompact Semi-Automatic Pistol- .22 Short, .25 ACP)
- 950BS Jetfire (Italy, Brazil, US - Subcompact Semi-Automatic Pistol - .22 Short, .25 ACP)
- Beretta 3032 Tomcat (Italy - Subcompact Semi-Automatic Pistol - .32 ACP)
- Beretta 3032 Alleycat (Italy - Subcompact Semi-Automatic Pistol - .32 ACP)
- Beretta 3032 Tomcat Inox (Italy - Subcompact Semi-Automatic Pistol - .32 ACP)
- Beretta 8000 Series
- Beretta 8000 Cougar D (Italy - Compact Semi-Automatic Pistol - 9×19mm Parabellum)
- Beretta 8000 Cougar F (Italy - Compact Semi-Automatic Pistol - 9×19mm Parabellum)
- Beretta 8000 Cougar G (Italy - Compact Semi-Automatic Pistol - 9×19mm Parabellum)
- Beretta 8000 Mini Cougar (Italy - Subcompact Semi-Automatic Pistol - 9×19mm Parabellum)
- Beretta 8000F (Italy - Compact Semi-Automatic Pistol - 9×19mm Parabellum, 9×21mm IMI, .41 Action Express)
- Beretta 8000F Cougar D (Italy -Compact Semi-Automatic Pistol- 9×19mm Parabellum, 9×21mm IMI, .41 Action Express)
- Beretta 8000F Cougar F (Italy - Compact Semi-Automatic Pistol - 9×19mm Parabellum, 9×21mm IMI, .41 Action Express)
- Beretta 8000F Cougar G (Italy - Compact Semi-Automatic Pistol - 9×19mm Parabellum, 9×21mm IMI, .41 Action Express)
- Beretta 8000L (Italy - Subcompact Semi-Automatic Pistol - 9×19mm Parabellum)
- Beretta 8000L Cougar D (Italy - Subcompact Semi-Automatic Pistol - 9×19mm Parabellum)
- Beretta 8000L Cougar F (Italy - Subcompact Semi-Automatic Pistol - 9×19mm Parabellum)
- Beretta 8000L Cougar G (Italy - Subcompact Semi-Automatic Pistol - 9×19mm Parabellum)
      - Beretta 8000L Type P (Italy - Subcompact Semi-Automatic Pistol - 9×19mm Parabellum)
        - Beretta 8000L Type P Cougar D (Italy - Subcompact Semi-Automatic Pistol - 9×19mm Parabellum)
        - Beretta 8000L Type P Cougar F (Italy - Subcompact Semi-Automatic Pistol - 9×19mm Parabellum)
        - Beretta 8000L Type P Cougar G (Italy - Subcompact Semi-Automatic Pistol - 9×19mm Parabellum)
      - Beretta 8040 (Italy - Compact Semi-Automatic Pistol - .40 S&W)
        - Beretta 8040 Cougar D (Italy - Compact Semi-Automatic Pistol - .40 S&W)
        - Beretta 8040 Cougar F (Italy - Compact Semi-Automatic Pistol - .40 S&W)
        - Beretta 8040 Cougar G (Italy - Compact Semi-Automatic Pistol - .40 S&W)
        - Beretta 8040 Mini Cougar (Italy - Subcompact Semi-Automatic Pistol - .40 S&W)
      - Beretta 8045 (Italy - Compact Semi-Automatic Pistol - .45 ACP)
        - Beretta 8045 Cougar D (Italy - Compact Semi-Automatic Pistol - .45 ACP)
        - Beretta 8045 Cougar F (Italy - Compact Semi-Automatic Pistol - .45 ACP)
          - Beretta 8045 LAPD (Italy - Compact Semi-Automatic Pistol - .45 ACP)
        - Beretta 8045 Cougar G (Italy - Compact Semi-Automatic Pistol - .45 ACP)
        - Beretta 8045 Mini Cougar (Italy - Subcompact Semi-Automatic Pistol - .45 ACP)
      - Beretta 8357 (Italy - Compact Semi-Automatic Pistol - .357 SIG)
        - Beretta Beretta8357 Cougar D (Italy - Compact Semi-Automatic Pistol - .357 SIG)
        - Beretta 8357 Cougar F (Italy - Compact Semi-Automatic Pistol - .357 SIG)
        - Beretta 8357 Cougar G (Italy - Compact Semi-Automatic Pistol - .357 SIG)
    - 9000 Series
      - Beretta 9000S Type D (Italy - Compact Semi-Automatic Pistol)
        - Beretta 9000S D9 (Italy - Compact Semi-Automatic Pistol - 9×19mm Parabellum)
        - Beretta 9000S D40 (Italy - Compact Semi-Automatic Pistol - .40 S&W)
      - Beretta 9000S Type F (Italy - Compact Semi-Automatic Pistol)
        - Beretta 9000S F9 (Italy - Compact Semi-Automatic Pistol - 9×19mm Parabellum)
        - Beretta 9000S F40 (Italy - Compact Semi-Automatic Pistol - .40 S&W)
    - Beretta M1923 (Italy - Semi-Automatic Pistol - 9×19mm Glisenti)
      - Beretta M1915 (Italy - Semi-Automatic Pistol - .32 ACP, .380 ACP, 9×19mm Glisenti)
        - M1915/19 (Italy - Semi-Automatic Pistol - .32 ACP)
    - Beretta M1931 (Italy - Semi-Automatic Pistol - .32 ACP)
    - Beretta M1932 (Italy - Semi-Automatic Pistol - .32 ACP, .380 ACP)
    - Beretta M1934 (Italy - Compact Semi-Automatic Pistol - .32 ACP, .380 ACP)
    - Beretta M1935 (Italy - Compact Semi-Automatic Pistol - .32 ACP)
    - Beretta M1948 (Italy - Semi-Automatic Pistol - .22 LR)
      - Beretta M948B (Italy - Semi-Automatic Pistol - .22 LR)
    - Beretta M1951 (Italy - Semi-Automatic Pistol - 9×19mm Parabellum)
      - Beretta M951-A (Italy - Machine Pistol - 9×19mm Parabellum)
      - Beretta M951-R (Italy - Machine Pistol - 9×19mm Parabellum)
      - Beretta M951-S (Italy - Semi-Automatic Pistol - 9×19mm Parabellum)
      - Beretta M952 (Italy - Semi-Automatic Pistol - 7.65×21mm Parabellum)
        - Beretta M952-S (Italy - Semi-Automatic Pistol - 7.65×21mm Parabellum)
      - Beretta M1950 (Italy - Semi-Automatic Pistol - 9×19mm Parabellum: Prototype)
      - Beretta Model 104 (Italy - Semi-Automatic Pistol - 9×19mm Parabellum)
      - Helwan 951 (Egypt - Semi-Automatic Pistol - 9×19mm Parabellum)
    - Beretta Model 70 (Italy - Semi-Automatic Pistol - .22 LR, .32 ACP)
      - Beretta Model 70S (Italy - Semi-Automatic Pistol - .22 LR, .380 ACP)
      - Beretta Model 71 (Italy - Semi-Automatic Pistol - .22 LR)
      - Beretta Model 72 (Italy - Semi-Automatic Pistol - .22 LR)
      - Beretta Model 73 (Italy - Semi-Automatic Pistol - .22 LR)
      - Beretta Model 74 (Italy - Semi-Automatic Pistol - .22 LR)
        - Beretta Model 100 (Italy - Semi-Automatic Pistol - .32 ACP)
      - Beretta Model 75 (Italy - Semi-Automatic Pistol - .22 LR)
      - Beretta Model 76 (Italy - Semi-Automatic Pistol - .22 LR)
        - Beretta Model 102 (Italy - Semi-Automatic Pistol - .22 LR)
    - Beretta Model 80 (Italy - Semi-Automatic Pistol - .22 Short)
    - Beretta Model 90 (Italy - Semi***Beretta 418 (Italy - Subcompact Semi-Automatic Pistol - .25 ACP)
      - Beretta 318 (Italy - Subcompact Semi-Automatic Pistol - .25 ACP)
      - Beretta M1920 (Italy - Subcompact Semi-Automatic Pistol - .25 ACP)
      - Beretta M1926 (Italy - Subcompact Semi-Automatic Pistol - .25 ACP)-Automatic Pistol - .32 ACP)
    - Beretta Model 99 (Italy - Semi-Automatic Pistol - 7.65×21mm Parabellum)
    - Beretta Px4 Storm (Italy - Semi-Automatic Pistol - 9×19mm Parabellum, 9×21mm IMI, .40 S&W, .45 ACP)
      - Beretta Px4 Storm Compact (Italy - Compact Semi-Automatic Pistol - 9×19mm Parabellum, 9×21mm IMI, .40 S&W, .45 ACP)
        - Beretta Px4 Storm Compact Type C (Italy - Compact Semi-Automatic Pistol - 9×19mm Parabellum, 9×21mm IMI, .40 S&W, .45 ACP)
        - Beretta Px4 Storm Compact Type D (Italy - Compact Semi-Automatic Pistol - 9×19mm Parabellum, 9×21mm IMI, .40 S&W, .45 ACP)
        - Beretta Px4 Storm Compact Type F (Italy - Compact Semi-Automatic Pistol - 9×19mm Parabellum, 9×21mm IMI, .40 S&W, .45 ACP)
        - Beretta Px4 Storm Compact Type G (Italy - Compact Semi-Automatic Pistol - 9×19mm Parabellum, 9×21mm IMI, .40 S&W, .45 ACP)
      - Beretta Px4 Storm Subcompact (Italy - Subcompact Semi-Automatic Pistol - 9×19mm Parabellum, 9×21mm IMI, .40 S&W, .45 ACP)
        - Beretta Px4 Storm Subcompact Type C (Italy - Subcompact Semi-Automatic Pistol - 9×19mm Parabellum, 9×21mm IMI, .40 S&W, .45 ACP)
        - Beretta Px4 Storm Subcompact Type D (Italy - Subcompact Semi-Automatic Pistol - 9×19mm Parabellum, 9×21mm IMI, .40 S&W, .45 ACP)
        - Beretta Px4 Storm Subcompact Type F (Italy - Subcompact Semi-Automatic Pistol - 9×19mm Parabellum, 9×21mm IMI, .40 S&W, .45 ACP)
        - Beretta Px4 Storm Subcompact Type G (Italy - Subcompact Semi-Automatic Pistol - 9×19mm Parabellum, 9×21mm IMI, .40 S&W, .45 ACP)
    - Beretta Px4 Storm Type C (Italy - Semi-Automatic Pistol - 9×19mm Parabellum, 9×21mm IMI, .40 S&W, .45 ACP)
    - Beretta Px4 Storm Type D (Italy - Semi-Automatic Pistol - 9×19mm Parabellum, 9×21mm IMI, .40 S&W, .45 ACP)
    - Beretta Px4 Storm Type F (Italy - Semi-Automatic Pistol - 9×19mm Parabellum, 9×21mm IMI, .40 S&W, .45 ACP)
    - Beretta Px4 Storm Type G (Italy - Semi-Automatic Pistol - 9×19mm Parabellum, 9×21mm IMI, .40 S&W, .45 ACP)
    - Beretta U22 NEOS (Italy - Semi-Automatic Pistol - .22 LR)
  - Revolvers
    - Model 1 (Italy - Double-Action Revolver - 9×19mm Parabellum, .357 Magnum)
    - PR-71 (Italy - Double-Action Revolver - .22 LR, .38 Special)
    - Beretta Stampede (Italy - Single-Action Revolver - .45 Long Colt)
      - Beretta Stampede Bisley (Italy - Single-Action Revolver - .45 Long Colt)
      - Beretta Stampede Buntline Carbine (Italy - Single-Action Revolving Rifle - .45 Long Colt)
      - Beretta Stampede Deluxe (Italy - Single-Action Revolver - .357 Magnum, .45 Long Colt)
      - Beretta Stampede Gemini (Italy - Single-Action Revolver - .45 Long Colt)
      - Beretta Stampede Inox (Italy - Single-Action Revolver - .45 Long Colt)
      - Beretta Stampede Old West (Italy - Single-Action Revolver - .45 Long Colt)
      - Beretta Stampede Old West Marshall (Italy - Single-Action Revolver - .45 Long Colt)
      - Beretta Stampede Philadelphia (Italy - Single-Action Revolver - .45 Long Colt)
    - Beretta Laramie (Italy - Single-Action Revolver - .38 Special, .45 Long Colt)
  - Rifles
    - Beretta AR70/90 (Italy - Assault Rifle - 5.56×45mm NATO)
      - Beretta SCP70/90 (Italy - Compact Assault Rifle - 5.56×45mm NATO)
      - Beretta SCS70/90 (Italy - Compact Assault Rifle - 5.56×45mm NATO)
    - Beretta ARX-160 (Italy - Assault Rifle - 5.45×39mm, 5.56×45mm NATO, 6.8mm Remington SPC, 7.62×39mm)
      - Beretta ARX-100 (Italy - Semi-Automatic Rifle - 5.45×39mm, 5.56×45mm NATO, 6.8mm Remington SPC, 7.62×39mm)
      - Beretta ARX-160SF (Italy - Semi-Automatic Rifle - 5.45×39mm, 5.56×45mm NATO, 6.8mm Remington SPC, 7.62×39mm)
      - Beretta ARX-160 PDW (Italy - Personal Defense Weapon - 5.45×39mm, 5.56×45mm NATO, 6.8mm Remington SPC, 7.62×39mm)
    - Beretta BM59 (Italy - Battle Rifle - 7.62×51mm NATO)
      - Beretta BM58 (Italy - Battle Rifle - 7.62×51mm NATO: Prototype)
      - Beretta BM59D (Italy - Battle Rifle - 7.62×51mm NATO)
      - Beretta BM59GL (Italy - Battle Rifle - 7.62×51mm NATO)
      - Beretta BM59R (Italy - Battle Rifle - 7.62×51mm NATO)
      - Beretta BM59SL (Italy - Semi-Automatic Rifle - 7.62×51mm NATO)
        - Beretta BM62 (Italy - Semi-Automatic Rifle - 7.62×51mm NATO)
      - Beretta BM59 Mark E (Italy - Battle Rifle - 7.62×51mm NATO)
      - Beretta BM59 Mark Ital (Italy - Battle Rifle - 7.62×51mm NATO)
        - Beretta BM59 Mark Ital-A (Italy - Battle Rifle - 7.62×51mm NATO)
        - Beretta BM59 Mark Ital Para (Italy - Battle Rifle - 7.62×51mm NATO)
        - Beretta BM59 Mark Ital TA (Italy - Battle Rifle - 7.62×51mm NATO)
      - Beretta BM59 Mark I (Italy - Battle Rifle - 7.62×51mm NATO)
      - Beretta BM59 Mark II (Italy - Battle Rifle - 7.62×51mm NATO)
      - Beretta BM59 Mark III (Italy - Battle Rifle - 7.62×51mm NATO)
      - Beretta BM59 Mark IV (Italy - Battle Rifle - 7.62×51mm NATO)
      - Beretta BM60CB (Italy - Battle Rifle - 7.62×51mm NATO)
    - Beretta M1 (Italy - Semi-Automatic Rifle - 7.62×51mm NATO, .30-'06: Licensed production M1 Garand)
      - Beretta M1LS (Italy - Semi-Automatic Carbine - 7.62×51mm NATO, .30-'06)
    - Model 455 (Italy - Side by Side Rifle - .375 Holland & Holland Magnum, .416 Rigby, .458 Winchester Magnum, .470 Nitro Express, .500 Nitro Express)
    - Beretta Model 500 (Italy - Bolt-Action Rifle - .222 Remington, .223 Remington)
    - Beretta Model 501 (Italy - Bolt-Action Rifle - .243 Winchester, .308 Winchester)
      - Beretta Model 501 Sniper (Italy - Bolt-Action Rifle - 7.62×51mm NATO, .243 Winchester, .308 Winchester)
    - Beretta Model 502 (Italy - Bolt-Action Rifle - 7mm Remington Magnum, .270 Winchester, .30-'06, .300 Winchester Magnum, .375 Holland & Holland Magnum)
      - Beretta Model 502S (Italy - Bolt-Action Rifle - 7mm Remington Magnum, .270 Winchester, .30-'06, .300 Winchester Magnum, .375 Holland & Holland Magnum)
    - Beretta Mato (Italy - Bolt Action Rifle - 7mm Remington Magnum, .270 Winchester, .280 Remington, .30-'06, .300 Winchester Magnum, .338 Winchester Magnum, .375 Holland & Holland Magnum)
    - Beretta P-30 M781 (Italy - Semi-Automatic Carbine - .30 Carbine: Licensed Production M1 Carbine)
    - Beretta Rx4 Storm (Italy - Semi-Automatic Rifle - 5.56×45mm NATO, .223 Remington)
    - Beretta S689 (Italy - Over/Under Rifle - 9.3×74mmR, .30-'06, .444 Marlin, 20 Gauge)
    - Beretta Sport (Italy - Semi-Automatic Rifle - .22 LR)
      - Beretta Olympia (Italy - Semi-Automatic Rifle - .22 LR)
        - Beretta Olympia X (Italy - Semi-Automatic Rifle - .22 LR)
      - Beretta Super Sport X (Italy - Semi-Automatic Rifle - .22 LR)
    - Beretta SS06 (Italy - Over/Under Rifle - 9.3×74mmR, .375 Holland & Holland Magnum, .458 Winchester Magnum)
    - Unione (Italy - Bolt-Action Rifle - .22 LR)
  - Shotguns
    - Beretta A300 Outlander (Italy - Semi-Automatic Shotgun - 12 Gauge)
    - Beretta A301 (Italy - Semi-Automatic Shotgun - 12 Gauge, 20 Gauge)
    - Beretta A302 (Italy - Semi-Automatic Shotgun - 12 Gauge, 20 Gauge)
    - Beretta A303 (Italy - Semi-Automatic Shotgun - 20 Gauge & 12 Gauge)
    - Beretta A304 (Italy - Semi-Automatic Shotgun - 12 Gauge)
    - Beretta A390 (Italy - Semi-Automatic Shotgun - 12 Gauge)
    - Beretta AL390 (Italy - Semi-Automatic Shotgun - 12 Gauge, 20 Gauge)
    - Beretta AL391 (Italy- Semi-Automatic Shotgun - 12 Gauge, 20 Gauge)
      - Beretta AL391 Teknys (Italy- Semi-Automatic Shotgun - 12 Gauge, 20 Gauge)
      - Beretta AL391 Urika (Italy- Semi-Automatic Shotgun - 12 Gauge, 20 Gauge)
      - Beretta AL391 Xtrema 2 (Italy- Semi-Automatic Shotgun - 12 Gauge)
    - Beretta ASE (Italy - Over/Under Shotgun - 12 Gauge, 20 Gauge)
      - ASEL (Italy - Over/Under Shotgun - 12 Gauge, 20 Gauge)
    - Beretta DT-10 (Italy - Over/Under Shotgun - 12 Gauge)
    - Beretta M3P (Italy - Semi-Automatic/Pump-Action Shotgun - 12 Gauge)
    - Beretta RS151 (Italy - Pump-Action Shotgun - 12 Gauge)
    - Beretta RS200 (Italy - Pump-Action Shotgun - 12 Gauge)
      - Beretta RS200-P (Italy - Pump-Action Shotgun - 12 Gauge)
    - Beretta RS202 (Italy - Pump-Action Shotgun - 12 Gauge)
      - Beretta RS202-M1 (Italy - Pump-Action Shotgun - 12 Gauge)
      - Beretta RS202-M2 (Italy - Pump-Action Shotgun - 12 Gauge)
        - Beretta RS202-P (Italy - Pump-Action Shotgun - 12 Gauge)
    - Beretta Silver Pigeon (Italy - Over/Under Shotgun - .410 Bore, 12 Gauge, 20 Gauge, 28 Gauge)
    - Beretta S1 (Italy - Over/Under Shotgun - 12 Gauge)
    - Beretta S2 (Italy - Over/Under Shotgun - 12 Gauge)
    - Beretta S3 (Italy - Over/Under Shotgun - 12 Gauge)
    - Beretta S55 (Italy - Over/Under Shotgun - 12 Gauge, 20 Gauge)
    - Beretta S56 (Italy - Over/Under Shotgun - 12 Gauge, 20 Gauge)
    - Beretta S57 (Italy - Over/Under Shotgun - 12 Gauge, 20 Gauge)
    - Beretta S58 (Italy - Over/Under Shotgun - 12 Gauge)
    - Beretta SO (Italy - Over/Under Shotguns)
      - Beretta SO1 (Italy - Over/Under Shotgun - 12 Gauge)
      - Beretta SO2 (Italy - Over/Under Shotgun - 12 Gauge)
      - Beretta SO3 (Italy - Over/Under Shotgun - 12 Gauge, 20 Gauge)
      - Beretta SO4 (Italy - Over/Under Shotgun - 12 Gauge)
      - Beretta SO5 (Italy - Over/Under Shotgun - 12 Gauge)
      - Beretta SO6 (Italy - Over/Under Shotgun - 12 Gauge)
      - Beretta SO9 (Italy - Over/Under Shotgun - .410 Bore, 28 Gauge, 20 Gauge, 16 Gauge, & 12 Gauge)
    - Beretta Vandalia (Italy - Single-Shot Shotgun - 12 Gauge)
    - Beretta 012 (Italy - Single-Shot Shotgun - 12 Gauge)
    - Beretta 013 (Italy - Single-Shot Shotgun - 12 Gauge)
    - Beretta 60 (Italy - Semi-Automatic Shotgun - 12 Gauge)
    - Beretta 61 (Italy - Semi-Automatic Shotgun - 12 Gauge)
    - Beretta 90 (Italy - Single-Shot Shotgun - 12 Gauge)
    - Beretta 101 (Italy - Side by Side Shotgun - 12 Gauge, 16 Gauge, 20 Gauge, 24 Gauge, 28 Gauge, 32 Gauge, 36 Gauge)
    - Beretta 103 (Italy - Side by Side Shotgun - 12 Gauge)
    - Beretta 104 (Italy - Side by Side Shotgun - 12 Gauge, 16 Gauge, 20 Gauge, 24 Gauge, 28 Gauge)
    - Beretta 105 (Italy - Side by Side Shotgun - 12 Gauge, 16 Gauge, 20 Gauge, 24 Gauge)
    - Beretta 151 (Italy - Pump-Action Shotgun - 12 Gauge)
    - Beretta 211 (Italy - Side by Side Shotgun - 12 Gauge)
    - Beretta 305 (Italy - Side by Side Shotgun - 12 Gauge)
    - Beretta 309 (Italy - Side by Side Shotgun - 12 Gauge)
    - Beretta 311 (Italy - Side by Side Shotgun - 12 Gauge, 16 Gauge, 20 Gauge, 24 Gauge)
    - Beretta 312 (Italy - Single-Shot Shotgun - 12 Gauge)
    - Beretta 313 (Italy - Single-Shot Shotgun - 12 Gauge)
    - Beretta 350 (Italy - Side by Side Shotgun - 12 Gauge)
    - Beretta 401 (Italy - Side by Side Shotgun - 12 Gauge, 16 Gauge, 20 Gauge, 24 Gauge, 28 Gauge)
    - Beretta 402 (Italy - Side by Side Shotgun - 12 Gauge)
    - Beretta 403 (Italy - Side by Side Shotgun - 12 Gauge, 16 Gauge, 20 Gauge, 24 Gauge, 28 Gauge, 32 Gauge)
    - Beretta 404 (Italy - Side by Side Shotgun - 12 Gauge, 16 Gauge)
    - Beretta 405 (Italy - Side by Side Shotgun - 12 Gauge)
    - Beretta 409 (Italy - Side by Side Shotgun - 20 Gauge)
    - Beretta 410 (Italy - Side by Side Shotgun - 12 Gauge, 16 Gauge, 20 Gauge, 24 Gauge, 28 Gauge)
    - Beretta 411 (Italy - Side by Side Shotgun - 12 Gauge, 16 Gauge, 20 Gauge)
    - Beretta 412 (Italy - Single-Shot Shotgun - 12 Gauge)
    - Beretta 413 (Italy - Single-Shot Shotgun - 12 Gauge)
    - Beretta 414 (Italy - Single-Shot Shotgun - 9mm Long Shot Rimfire)
    - Beretta 424 (Italy - Side by Side Shotgun - 12 Gauge, 16 Gauge, 20 Gauge)
    - Beretta 425 (Italy - Side by Side Shotgun - 12 Gauge)
    - Beretta 426 (Italy - Side by Side Shotgun - 12 Gauge)
    - Beretta 427 (Italy - Side by Side Shotgun - 12 Gauge)
    - Beretta 450 (Italy - Side by Side Shotgun - 12 Gauge)
    - Beretta 451 (Italy - Side by Side Shotgun - 12 Gauge)
    - Beretta 452 (Italy - Side by Side Shotgun - 12 Gauge)
    - Beretta 470 (Italy - Side by Side Shotgun - 12 Gauge, 20 Gauge)
    - Beretta 625 (Italy - Side by Side Shotgun - 12 Gauge)
    - Beretta 626 (Italy - Side by Side Shotgun - 12 Gauge)
    - Beretta 627 (Italy - Side by Side Shotgun - 12 Gauge)
    - Beretta 680 (Italy - Over/Under Shotgun - 12 Gauge)
    - Beretta 682 (Italy - Over/Under Shotgun - 12 Gauge)
    - Beretta 686 (Italy - Over/Under Shotgun - 12 Gauge, 20 Gauge, 28 Gauge)
    - Beretta 687 (Italy - Over/Under Shotgun - .410 Bore, 12 Gauge, 20 Gauge, 28 Gauge)
    - Beretta 922 (Italy - Side by Side Shotgun - 12 Gauge)
    - Beretta 930 (Italy - Single-Shot Shotgun - 10 Gauge)
    - Beretta 1009 (Italy - Side by Side Shotgun - 12 Gauge)
    - Beretta 1010 (Italy - Side by Side Shotgun - 12 Gauge, 16 Gauge, 20 Gauge, 24 Gauge)
    - Beretta 1011 (Italy - Side by Side Shotgun - 12 Gauge)
    - Beretta 1012 (Italy - Single Shot Shotgun - 12 Gauge)
    - Beretta 1013 (Italy - Single Shot Shotgun - 12 Gauge)
    - Beretta 1050 (Italy - Side by Side Shotgun - 12 Gauge)
    - Beretta 1200 (Italy - Semi-Automatic Shotgun - 12 Gauge)
      - Beretta 1200F (Italy - Semi-Automatic Shotgun - 12 Gauge)
      - Beretta 1200FP (Italy - Semi-Automatic Shotgun - 12 Gauge)
    - Beretta 1201 (Italy - Semi-Automatic Shotgun - 12 Gauge)
      - Beretta 1200F (Italy - Semi-Automatic Shotgun - 12 Gauge)
      - Beretta 1201FP3 (Italy - Semi-Automatic Shotgun - 12 Gauge)
    - Beretta 1409 (Italy - Side by Side Shotgun - 12 Gauge)
    - Beretta 1930 (Italy - Side by Side Shotgun - 12 Gauge, 16 Gauge, 20 Gauge, 24 Gauge)
  - Submachine Guns
    - Beretta Cx4 Storm (Italy - Semi-Automatic Carbine - 9×19mm Parabellum, 9×21mm IMI, .40 S&W, .45 ACP)
      - Beretta Mx4 Storm (Italy - Submachine Gun - 9×19mm Parabellum, .45 ACP)
    - Beretta M1918 (Italy - Submachine Gun - 9×19mm Glisenti)
      - Beretta Model 18/30 (Italy - Submachine Gune - 9×19mm Glisenti)
    - Beretta MAB 38 (Italy - Submachine Gun - 9×19mm Parabellum)
      - Beretta MAB 38A (Italy - Submachine Gun - 9×19mm Parabellum)
      - Beretta MAB 38 (Italy - Submachine Gun - 9×19mm Parabellum)
      - Beretta MAB 38/42 (Italy - Submachine Gun - 9×19mm Parabellum)
      - Beretta MAB 38/43 (Italy - Submachine Gun - 9×19mm Parabellum)
      - Beretta MAB 38/44 (Italy - Submachine Gun - 9×19mm Parabellum)
      - Beretta MAB 38/49 (Italy - Submachine Gun - 9×19mm Parabellum)
        - Beretta Model 2 (Italy - Submachine Gun - 9×19mm Parabellum)
        - Beretta Model 4 (Italy - Submachine Gun - 9×19mm Parabellum)
  - Beretta M12 (Italy - Submachine Gun - 9×19mm Parabellum)
    - Beretta PM12S (Italy - Submachine Gun - 9×19mm Parabellum)
    - Beretta PM12S2 (Italy - Submachine Gun - 9×19mm Parabellum)
- Bernardelli
  - Pistols
    - Bernardelli 69 (Italy - Semi-Automatic Pistol - .22 LR)
    - Bernardelli Mod. USA (Italy - Semi-Automatic Pistol - .22 LR, .32 ACP, .380 ACP)
  - Rifles
    - Bernardelli VB-SR (Italy - Assault Rifle - 5.56×45mm NATO: Licensed production IMI Galil)
  - Shotguns
    - Bernardelli B4 (Italy - Semi-Automatic/Pump-Action Shotgun - 12 Gauge)
      - Bernardelli B4/B (Italy - Pump-Action Shotgun - 12 Gauge)
    - Bernardelli P One (Italy - Semi-Automatic Pistol - 9×19mm Parabellum, .40 S&W)
    - Bernardelli PO-18 (Italy - Semi-Automatic Pistol - 9×19mm Parabellum)
      - Bernardelli P0-18 Compact (Italy - Compact Semi-Automatic Pistol - 9×19mm Parabellum)
    - Bernardelli P6 (Italy - Semi-Automatic Pistol - .22 LR, .32 ACP, .380 ACP)
    - Bernardelli P8 (Italy - Semi-Automatic Pistol - .22 LR, .32 ACP, .380)
- Bersa
  - Pistols
    - Bersa 83 (Argentina - Semi-Automatic Pistol - .380 ACP)
    - Bersa 95 (Argentina - Semi-Automatic Pistol - .380 ACP)
    - Bersa Thunder Series (Argentina - Semi-Automatic Pistols)
      - Bersa Thunder 9 (Argentina - Semi-Automatic Pistol - 9×19mm Parabellum)
      - Bersa Thunder 22 (Argentina - Semi-Automatic Pistol - .22 LR)
        - Bersa Thunder 22-6 (Argentina - Semi-Automatic Pistol - .22 LR)
      - Bersa Thunder 32 (Argentina - Semi-Automatic Pistol - .32 ACP)
      - Bersa Thunder 40 (Argentina - Semi-Automatic Pistol - .40 S&W)
      - Bersa Thunder 45 (Argentina - Semi-Automatic Pistol - .45 ACP)
      - Bersa Thunder 380 (Argentina - Semi-Automatic Pistol - .380 ACP)
      - Bersa Thunder Ultra Compact (Argentina - Compact Semi-Automatic Pistols)
        - Bersa Thunder 9 Ultra Compact (Argentina - Compact Semi-Automatic Pistol - 9×19mm Parabellum)
- Bersa Thunder 40 Ultra Compact (Argentina - Compact Semi-Automatic Pistol - .40 S&W)
- Bersa Thunder 45 Ultra Compact(Argentina - Compact Semi-Automatic Pistol - .45 ACP)
- Berthier Rifles (France - Bolt-Action Carbines and Rifles)
  - Berthier Mle 1890 (France - Bolt-Action Carbine - 8mm Lebel)
  - Berthier Mle 1892 (France - Bolt-Action Carbine - 8mm Lebel)
  - Berthier Mle 1902 (France - Bolt-Action Rifle - 8mm Lebel)
  - Berthier Mle 1907 (France - Bolt-Action Rifle - 8mm Lebel)
    - Berthier Mle 1907/15 (France - Bolt-Action Rifle - 7.5×54mm French)
  - Mousquetons Berthier (France - Bolt-Action Carbine - 8mm Lebel)
- Bingham Arms
  - Rifles
    - Bingham AK 22 (US - Semi-Automatic Rifle - .22 LR)
- Birmingham Small Arms Company
  - Rifles
    - BSA Autorifle (UK - Semi Automatic Rifle - .303 British)
  - Machine Guns
- Lewis Light Machine Gun (UK - Light Machine Gun - 7.92×57mm Mauser, .30-06 Springfield, .303 British)
- Lewis Gun 12.7mm Variant (UK - Light Machine Gun - 12.7×81mm)
- Lewis Gun Aircraft Pattern (UK - Aircraft Mounted Machine Gun - 7.92×57mm Mauser, .30-06 Springfield, .303 British)
- Lewis Gun Anti-Aircraft Configuration (UK - Anti-Aircraft Machine Gun - 7.92×57mm Mauser, .30-06 Springfield, .303 British)
- Lewis Gun Light Infantry Pattern (UK - Light Machine Gun - 7.92×57mm Mauser, .30-06 Springfield, .303 British)
- Lewis Gun Mk I (UK - Light Machine Gun - 7.92×57mm Mauser, .30-06 Springfield, .303 British)
- Lewis Gun Mk II (UK -Light Machine Gun- 7.92×57mm Mauser, .30-06 Springfield, .303 British)
- Lewis Gun Mk III (UK - Light Machine Gun - 7.92×57mm Mauser, .30-06 Springfield, .303 British)
- Lewis Gun Mk IV (UK -Light Machine Gun- 7.92×57mm Mauser, .30-06 Springfield, .303 British)
- Lewis Gun Mk V (UK -Light Machine Gun- 7.92×57mm Mauser, .30-06 Springfield, .303 British)
      - Lewis Gun Short Barreled Variant (UK - Shortened Light Machine Gun - 7.92×57mm Mauser, .30-06 Springfield, .303 British)
  - Submachine Guns
    - BSA Welgun (UK - Submachine Gun - 9×19mm Parabellum)
- Biwarip machine carbine (United Kingdom - Submachine Gun - 9×19mm Parabellum)
- Blaser
  - Rifles
    - Blaser R93 (Germany - Straight-Pull Bolt-Action Hunting Rifle - 7.62×51mm NATO)
      - Blaser R8 (Germany - Straight-Pull Bolt-Action Hunting Rifle - 7.62×51mm NATO)
      - Blaser R93 Tactical (Germany - Straight-Pull Bolt-Action Sniper Rifle)
        - Blaser R93 LRS 2 (Germany - Straight-Pull Bolt-Action Sniper Rifle - 6mm Norma BR6.5×55mm, 7.62×51mm NATO, .223 Remington, .300 Winchester Magnum, .308 Winchester)
        - Blaser R93 Tactical 2 (Germany - Straight-Pull Bolt-Action Sniper Rifle - .223 Remington, .300 Winchester Magnum, .308 Winchester, .338 Lapua Magnum)
        - Blaser R93 Tactical LRT (Germany - Straight-Pull Bolt-Action Sniper Rifle - 6.5×55mm, 7.62×51mm NATO, .300 Winchester Magnum, .338 Lapua Magnum)
  - Shotguns
    - Blaser F3 (Germany - Break-Action Shotgun - 12 Gauge, 20 Gauge, 28 Gauge)
- Blunderbuss
- Bofors
  - Bofors AGR (Sweden - Pump-Action Grenade Launcher - 40mm Medium Velocity Grenade)
  - Ak 5 (Sweden - Assault Rifle - 5.56×45mm NATO)
    - Ak 5B (Sweden - Assault Rifle - 5.56×45mm NATO)
    - Ak 5C (Sweden - Assault Rifle - 5.56×45mm NATO)
    - AK 5CF (Sweden - Assault Rifle - 5.56×45mm NATO: Prototype)
    - Ak 5D (Sweden - Compact Assault Rifle - 5.56×45mm NATO)
    - CGA5C2 (Sweden - Assault Rifle - 5.56×45mm NATO: Prototype)
    - CGA5P (Sweden - Semi-Automatic Rifle - 5.56×45mm NATO)
- Bofors Carl Gustaf
  - Rifles
- Carl Gustav M96/38 (Sweden - Bolt-Action Rifle - 6.5×55mm)
  - Submachine Guns
    - Carl Gustaf M/45 (Sweden - Submachine Gun - 9×19mm Parabellum)
      - Carl Gustav M/45B (Sweden - Submachine Gun - 9×19mm Parabellum)
        - Carl Gustav M/45BE (Sweden - Submachine Gun - 9×19mm Parabellum)
        - Carl Gustav M/45BET (Sweden - Submachine Gun - 9×19mm Parabellum)
      - Carl Gustav M/45C (Sweden - Submachine Gun - 9×19mm Parabellum)
      - Carl Gustav M/45S (Sweden - Submachine Gun - 9×19mm Parabellum: Prototype)
- Borz Submachine Gun (Chechen Republic of Ichkeria - Submachine Gun - 9×18mm Makarov)
- Breda Meccanica Bresciana
  - Machine Guns
- Breda Modello 30 Light Machine Gun (Kingdom of Italy - Light Machine Gun - 6.5×52mm Mannlicher–Carcano)
- Breda Modello 37 Heavy Machine Gun (Kingdom of Italy - Heavy Machine Gun - 7.92×57mm Mauser, 8×59mm RB Breda)
- Breda Modello 38 Heavy Machine Gun (Kingdom of Italy - Vehicle-Mounted Heavy Machine Gun - 7.92×57mm Mauser, 8×59mm RB Breda)
  - Rifles
- Breda M1935 PG Rifle (Kingdom of Italy - Battle Rifle - 6.5×52mm Carcano)
- Bren Ten(US - Semi-Automatic Pistol)
- Bren Ten API (US - Semi-Automatic Pistol - 10mm Auto)
- Bren Ten Dual-Master (US - Semi-Automatic Pistol - 10mm Auto, .45 ACP)
- Bren Ten Initial Issue (US - Semi-Automatic Pistol - 10mm Auto)
- Bren Ten Marksman Special Match (US - Semi-Automatic Pistol - .45 ACP)
- Bren Ten MP (US - Semi-Automatic Pistol - 10mm Auto)
- Bren Ten Pocket Model (US - Subcompact Semi-Automatic Pistol - 10mm Auto: Prototype)
  - Bren Ten Prototype (US - Semi-Automatic Pistol - 10mm Auto: Prototype)
  - Bren Ten SM (US - Semi-Automatic Pistol - 10mm Auto)
  - Bren Ten Special Forces Pistols (US - Compact Semi-Automatic Pistols)
    - Bren Ten Special Forces D (US - Compact Semi-Automatic Pistol - 10mm Auto)
    - Bren Ten Special Forces L (US - Compact Semi-Automatic Pistol - 10mm Auto)
- Britarms Model 2000 (UK - Semi-Automatic Pistol - .22 LR)
- British Armed Forces Small Arms Designations
  - Launchers
    - L17A1 (Germany, UK - Underslung Grenade Launcher - 40×46mm Grenade: HK AG36 Variant)
      - L17A2 (UK - Underslung Grenade Launcher - 40×46mm Grenade)
      - L123A2 UGL (UK - Underslung Grenade Launcher - 40×46mm Grenade)
    - L48A1 (UK - Single-Shot Riot Gun - 37mm Grenade: ARWEN 37 Variant)
      - L48A2 (UK - Single-Shot Riot Gun - 37mm Grenade)
    - L67A1 (UK - Single-Shot Riot Gun - 37mm Grenade: Arwen 37 Variant)
  - Machine Guns
    - L3A1 (US, UK - Medium Machine Gun - .30-06: Browning M1919A4 Variant)
      - L3A2 (UK - Medium Machine Gun - .303 British)
- L3A4 (UK - Medium Machine Gun - .303 British)
- L3A3 (UK - Medium Machine Gun - .303 British)
- L4A1 (UK - Light Machine Gun - 7.62×51mm NATO: Bren Light Machine Gun Variant)
- L4A2 (UK - Light Machine Gun - 7.62×51mm NATO)
- L4A4 (UK - Light Machine Gun - 7.62×51mm NATO)
- L4A3 (UK - Light Machine Gun - 7.62×51mm NATO)
- L4A5 (UK - Light Machine Gun - 7.62×51mm NATO)
- L4A6 (UK - Light Machine Gun - 7.62×51mm NATO)
- L4A9 (UK -Light Machine Gun- 7.62×51mm NATO)
- L6A1(UK -Ranging Gun- .50 BMG)
      - L11A1 (UK - Ranging Gun - .50 BMG)
      - L40A1 (UK - Ranging Gun - .50 BMG)
    - L7A1 (Belgium, UK - General-Purpose Machine Gun - 7.62×51mm NATO: FN MAG Variant)
      - L7A2 (UK - General-Purpose Machine Gun - 7.62×51mm NATO)
- L112A1(UK - Helicopter Mounted General-Purpose Machine Gun - 7.62×51mm NATO)
- L8A1 (UK - Vehicle Mounted General-Purpose Machine Gun - 7.62×51mm NATO)
- L8A2(UK - Vehicle Mounted General-Purpose Machine Gun - 7.62×51mm NATO)
- L37A1 (UK - Vehicle Mounted General-Purpose Machine Gun - 7.62×51mm NATO)
- L37A2 (UK - Vehicle Mounted General-Purpose Machine Gun - 7.62×51mm NATO)
      - L19A1 (UK - General-Purpose Machine Gun - 7.62×51mm NATO)
      - L20A1 (UK - General-Purpose Machine Gun - 7.62×51mm NATO)
        - L20A2 (UK - General-Purpose Machine Gun - 7.62×51mm NATO)
        - L44A1 (UK - General-Purpose Machine Gun - 7.62×51mm NATO)
      - L43A1 (UK - Ranging Gun - 7.62×51mm NATO)
    - L94A1 (US, UK - Vehicle-Mounted Chain Gun - 7.62×51mm NATO: Hughes EX34 Variant)
    - L95A1 (UK - Vehicle-Mounted Chain Gun - 7.62×51mm NATO)
- L108A1 (Belgium, UK - Light Machine Gun - 5.56×45mm NATO: FN Minimi Variant)
- L110A1 (Belgium, UK - Shortened Light Machine Gun - 5.56×45mm NATO: FN Minimi Para Variant)
- L111A1(US, UK - Heavy Machine Gun - .50 BMG: Browning M2HB Variant)
- XL17E1(United Kingdom of Great Britain and Northern Ireland/United States - British Armed Forces/General Electric - Unknown Date - Heavy Machine Gun - .50 BMG: Variant of the American General Electric M85 heavy machine gun. Never adopted by the British Armed Forces. Prototypes only.)
- XL17E2 (United Kingdom of Great Britain and Northern Ireland/United States - British Armed Forces/General Electric - Unknown Date - Heavy Machine Gun - .50 BMG: Variant of the British XL17E1 heavy machine gun.)
  - Pistols
- L9A1 (Belgium, UK - Semi-Automatic Pistol - 9×19mm Parabellum: Browning Hi-Power Variant)
- L9A2 (UK - Semi-Automatic Pistol - 9×19mm Parabellum)
- L9A3 (UK - Semi-Automatic Pistol - 9×19mm Parabellum)
- L11A1 (UK - Semi-Automatic Pistol - 9×19mm Parabellum)
- L47A1 (Germany, UK - Compact Semi-Automatic Pistol - .32 ACP: Walther PP Variant)
- L66A1 (Germany, UK - Semi-Automatic Pistol - .22 Long Rifle: Walther GSP Variant)
    - L102A1 (Germany, UK - Compact Semi-Automatic Pistol - 7.65×21mm Parabellum, 9×19mm Parabellum, 9×21mm IMI: Walther P5 Compact Variant)
    - L105A1 (Switzerland, UK - Semi-Automatic Pistol - 9×19mm Parabellum, .357 SIG, .40 S&W: SIG Sauer P226 Variant)
- L106A1 (Switzerland, UK - Semi-Automatic Pistol - 9×19mm Parabellum, .357 SIG, .40 S&W)
- L107A1 (Switzerland, UK - Compact Semi-Automatic Pistol - 9×19mm Parabellum, .357 SIG, .40 S&W: SIG Sauer P229 Variant)
  - Rifles
    - L1A1 (Belgium, UK - Semi-Automatic Rifle - 7.62×51mm NATO: FN FAL Variant)
- L1A2 (UK - Semi-Automatic Rifle - 7.62×51mm NATO)
- L2A1 (UK - Light Machine Gun - 7.62×51mm NATO)
- L2A2 (UK - Light Machine Gun - 7.62×51mm NATO)
      - L5A1 (UK - Semi-Automatic Rifle - 7.62×51mm NATO)
        - L5A2 (UK - Semi-Automatic Rifle - 7.62×51mm NATO)
        - L5A3 (UK - Semi-Automatic Rifle - 7.62×51mm NATO)
    - L29A1 (UK - Single-Shot Bolt-Action Rifle - .22 Long Rifle)
      - L29A2 (UK - Single-Shot Bolt-Action Rifle - .22 Long Rifle)
    - L42A1 (UK - Bolt-Action Sniper Rifle - 7.62×51mm NATO: Lee–Enfield Conversion)
      - L42A1 (UK - Bolt-Action Sniper Rifle - 7.62×51mm NATO)
    - L81A1 (UK - Bolt-Action Sniper Rifle - 7.62×51mm NATO: Parker Hale M82 Variant)
- L85A1(UK - Assault Rifle - 5.56×45mm NATO)
- L22A1(UK - Carbine - 5.56×45mm NATO)
- L22A2(UK - Carbine - 5.56×45mm NATO)
- L85A2(UK - Assault Rifle - 5.56×45mm NATO)
- L86A1(UK - Squad Automatic Weapon - 5.56×45mm NATO)
- L86A2 (UK - Squad Automatic Weapon - 5.56×45mm NATO)
- L96A1(United Kingdom of Great Britain and Northern Ireland - British Armed Forces/Accuracy International - 1982 - Bolt-Action Sniper Rifle - 7.62×51mm NATO, .308 Winchester: Variant of the British Accuracy International Precision Marksman bolt-action sniper rifle. Replaced the L42A1 bolt-action sniper rifles in service with the British Armed Forces. Features Schmidt & Bender 6×42 telescopic sights.)
    - L98A1 (UK - Single-Shot Rifle - 5.56×45mm NATO)
- L100A1 (Germany, UK - Carbine - 7.62×51mm NATO: H&K G3KA4 Variant)
- L101A1 (Germany, UK - Carbine - 5.56×45mm NATO: HK53 Variant)
- L115A1 (United Kingdom of Great Britain and Northern Ireland - British Armed Forces/Accuracy International - Unknown Date - Bolt-Action Sniper Rifle - .338 Lapua Magnum: Variant of the British Accuracy International Arctic Warfare Magnum bolt-action sniper rifle. Features Schmidt & Bender 3-12×50 PM II telescopic sights.)
      - L115A3 (United Kingdom of Great Britain and Northern Ireland - British Armed Forces/Accuracy International - 2007 - Bolt-Action Sniper Rifle - .338 Lapua Magnum: Variant of the British L115A1 bolt-action sniper rifle. Features a more modular design than the L115A1.)
    - L118A1 (United Kingdom of Great Britain and Northern Ireland - British Armed Forces/Accuracy International - 1991 - Bolt-Action Sniper Rifle - 7.62×51mm NATO, .308 Winchester: Variant of the British Accuracy International Arctic Warfare bolt-action sniper rifle. Features Schmidt & Bender MILITARY MK II 3-12×50 telescopic sights.)
    - L119A1 (Canada, UK - Carbine - 5.56×45mm NATO: Colt Canada C8SFW Variant)
    - L121A1 (United Kingdom of Great Britain and Northern Ireland - British Armed Forces/Accuracy International - 2002 - Bolt-Action Anti-Materiel Rifle - .50 BMG: Variant of the British Accuracy International Arctic Warfare .50 Folding bolt-action anti-materiel rifle in service with the United Kingdom of Great Britain and Northern Ireland. In use with the British Special Air Service.)
  - Shotguns
    - L32A1 (US, UK - Semi-Automatic Shotgun - 12 Gauge: Browning Auto-5 Riot Variant)
    - L74A1 (US, UK - Shotgun - 12 Gauge: Remington Model 870 Variant)
  - Submachine Guns
    - L2A1 (UK - Submachine Gun - 9×19mm Parabellum: Sterling Submachine Gun Variant)
      - L2A2 (UK - Submachine Gun - 9×19mm Parabellum)
      - L2A3 (UK - Submachine Gun - 9×19mm Parabellum)
      - L34A1 (UK - Integrally Suppressed Submachine Gun - 9×19mm Parabellum)
    - L50A1 (UK - Submachine Gun - 9×19mm Parabellum: Sten Mk II Variant)
    - L51A1 (UK - Submachine Gun - 9×19mm Parabellum: Sten Mk III Variant)
    - L52A1 (UK - Submachine Gun - 9×19mm Parabellum: Sten Mk V Variant)
- L80A1 (Germany, UK - Compact Submachine Gun - 9×19mm Parabellum: H&K MP5K Variant)
- L90A1 (Germany, UK - Compact Submachine Gun - 9×19mm Parabellum: H&K MP5KA1 Variant)
- L91A1 (Germany, UK - Integrally Suppressed Submachine Gun - 9×19mm Parabellum: H&K MP5-SD3 Variant)
- L92A1 (Germany, UK - Submachine Gun - 9×19mm Parabellum: H&K MP5A3 Variant)
- Brown Bess(UK - Musket)
- Brown Precision Tactical Elite (US - Bolt-Acton Sniper Rifle - .308 Winchester)
- John Browning
  - Machine Guns
- Browning M2 (US - Heavy Machine Gun - .50 BMG)
- Browning AN/M2(US - Aircraft Mounted Machine Gun - .50 BMG)
- Browning M213 (US - Aircraft Mounted Machine Gun - .50 BMG)
- Browning XM213(US - Aircraft Mounted Machine Gun - .50 BMG: Prototype)
- Browning M296 (US - Aircraft Mounted Machine Gun - .50 BMG)
- Browning XM296 (US - Aircraft Mounted Machine Gun - .50 BMG: Prototype)
- Browning AN/M3 (US - Aircraft Mounted Machine Gun - .50 BMG)
- Browning GAU-15/A (US - Aircraft Mounted Machine Gun- .50 BMG)
        - Browning GAU-16/A (US - Aircraft Mounted Machine Gun - .50 BMG)
      - Browning GAU-18/A (US - Aircraft Mounted Machine Gun - .50 BMG)
      - Browning M2A1 (US - Heavy Machine Gun - .50 BMG)
      - Browning M2HB (US - Heavy Machine Gun - .50 BMG)
    - Browning M1917 (US - Heavy Machine Gun - .30-'06)
      - Browning M1917A1 (US - Heavy Machine Gun - .30-'06)
      - Browning M1918 (US - Aircraft Mounted Machine Gun - .30-'06)
- Browning M1918M1(US - Aircraft Mounted Machine Gun - .30-'06)
- Browning M1918 BAR (US - Light Machine Gun - .30-'06)
- Browning Automatic Machine Rifle Model 1919 (US - Light Machine Gun - .30-'06)

Browning Automatic Machine Rifle Model 1924 (US - Light Machine Gun - .30-'06)

- Browning R75(US - Light Machine Gun - .30-'06)
          - Browning R75A (US - Light Machine Gun - .30-'06)
      - Browning M1918A1 BAR (US - Light Machine Gun - .30-'06)
      - Browning M1918A2 BAR (US - Light Machine Gun - .30-'06)
      - Browning M1922 BAR (US - Light Machine Gun - .30-'06)
    - M1919 Browning machine gun
      - Browning .30 AN/M2 (US - Aircraft Mounted Machine Gun - .30-'06)
- Browning T33 (US - Aircraft Mounted Machine Gun, Medium Machine Gun - .30-'06)
- Browning .303 Mk II(US - Medium Machine Gun - .303 British)
- Browning M37 (US - Vehicle Mounted Machine Gun - .30-'06)
- Browning M37A1(US - Vehicle Mounted Machine Gun - .30-'06)
- Browning M37C (US - Aircraft Mounted Machine Gun - .30-'06)
        - Browning M37E1 (US - Vehicle Mounted Machine Gun - 7.62×51mm NATO: Prototype)
        - Browning M37F (US - Vehicle Mounted Machine Gun - .30-'06: Prototype)
      - Browning M1919A1 (US - Medium Machine Gun - .30-'06)
      - Browning M1919A2 (US - Medium Machine Gun - .30-'06)
        - Browning M1919A3 (US - Medium Machine Gun - .30-'06)
      - Browning M1919A4 (US - Medium Machine Gun - .30-'06)
        - Browning M1919A4E1 (US - Medium Machine Gun - .30-'06)
        - Browning M1919A5 (US - Medium Machine Gun - .30-'06)
      - Browning M1919A6 (US - Medium Machine Gun - .30-'06)
      - Browning Mk 21 Mod 0 (US - Medium Machine Gun - 7.62×51mm NATO)
    - Browning M1921 (US - Heavy Machine Gun - .50 BMG)
      - Browning M1921A1 (US - Heavy Machine Gun - .50 BMG)
  - Pistols
    - FN Baby Browning (Belgium - Subcompact Semi-Automatic Pistol - .25 ACP)
    - Browning BDA (Belgium - Semi-Automatic Pistol - 9×19mm Parabellum, 9×21mm IMI)
      - Browning BDAC (Belgium - Compact Semi-Automatic Pistol - 9×19mm Parabellum, 9×21mm IMI)
      - Browning BDAM (Belgium - Semi-Automatic Pistol - 9×19mm Parabellum, 9×21mm IMI)
      - Browning BDAO (Belgium - Semi-Automatic Pistol - 9×19mm Parabellum, 9×21mm IMI)
    - Browning BDM (US - Semi-Automatic Pistol - 9×19mm Parabellum)
    - Browning Buck Mark (US - Semi-Automatic Pistol - .22 LR)
    - Browning Challenger (Belgium - Semi-Automatic Pistol - .22 LR)
    - Browning Hi-Power (Belgium - Semi-Automatic Pistol - 9×19mm Parabellum)
      - Browning Hi-Power Mk I (Belgium - Semi-Automatic Pistol - 9×19mm Parabellum)
      - Browning Hi-Power Mk I Lightweight (Belgium - Semi-Automatic Pistol - 9×19mm Parabellum)
      - Browning Hi-Power Mk II (Belgium - Semi-Automatic Pistol - 9×19mm Parabellum)
      - Browning Hi-Power Mk III (Belgium - Semi-Automatic Pistol - 9×19mm Parabellum & .40 S&W)
- Browning Hi-Power-SFS (Belgium - Semi-Automatic Pistol - 9×19mm Parabellum & .40 S&W)
- Browning Hi-Power Captain (Belgium - Semi-Automatic Pistol - 9×19mm Parabellum & .40 S&W)
- Browning Hi-Power Practical (Belgium - Semi-Automatic Pistol - 9×19mm Parabellum & .40 S&W)
- Browning Hi-Power Silver Chrome (Belgium - Semi-Automatic Pistol - 9×19mm Parabellum & .40 S&W)
      - Browning Hi-Power Standard (Belgium - Semi-Automatic Pistol - 9×19mm Parabellum & .40 S&W)
    - Browning Medalist (Belgium - Semi-Automatic Pistol - .22 LR)
  - Rifles
    - Browning A-Bolt (US, Japan - Bolt-Acton Rifle)
    - Browning M71 (US, Japan - Lever-Action Rifle - .30'06)
    - Browning Model 81 BLR (US - Lever-Action Rifle - 7mm Remington Magnum, 7mm Winchester Short Magnum, 7mm-08 Remington, .22-250 Remington, .223 Remington, .243 Winchester, .257 Roberts, .270 Winchester, .270 Winchester Short Magnum, .30-06 Springfield, .300 Winchester Magnum, .300 Winchester Short Magnum, .308 Winchester, .325 Winchester Short Magnum, .358 Winchester, .450 Marlin)
- Browning Model 81 Lightning BLR (US - Lever-Action Rifle - 7mm Remington Magnum, 7mm Winchester Short Magnum, 7mm-08 Remington, .22-250 Remington, .223 Remington, .243 Winchester, .257 Roberts, .270 Winchester, .270 Winchester Short Magnum, .30-06 Springfield, .300 Winchester Magnum, .300 Winchester Short Magnum, .308 Winchester, .325 Winchester Short Magnum, .358 Winchester, .450 Marlin)
  - Shotguns
    - Browning A-Bolt (US - Semi-Automatic Shotgun - 12 Gauge)
    - Browning Citori (US, Japan - Over/Under Shotgun - 12 Gauge, 16 Gauge, 20 Gauge, 28 Gauge, .410 Bore)
    - Browning Superposed (US - Over/Under Shotgun - 12 Gauge, 16 Gauge, 20 Gauge, 28 Gauge, .410 Bore)
- Brügger & Thomet
  - Assault Rifles
    - APC223/556
  - Battle Rifles
    - APC308
  - Pistols
    - Brügger & Thomet USW-P
    - Brügger & Thomet USW-SF
  - Pistol calibre carbines
    - GHM9
    - SPC9
  - Sniper rifles
    - APR308
    - APR308/338
    - SPR300
  - Submachine Gun
    - Brügger & Thomet APC
    - Brügger & Thomet KH9
    - Brügger & Thomet MP5 (Switzerland - Submachine Gun - 9×19mm Parabellum: Heckler & Koch MP5 Variant)
    - Brügger & Thomet MP9
    - Brügger & Thomet TP380
- Brunswick Corporation
  - Brunswick machine gun (US - Machine Gun - 5.56×45mm NATO / 7.62×51mm NATO)
  - Brunswick RAW (US - Grenade Launcher - )
- BS-1 Tishina (Russia - Integrally Suppressed Underslung Grenade Launcher - 30mm Grenade)
- BSP Planning and Design Pty. Ltd.
  - Gordon Close-Support Weapon System (Australia - Exotic Firearms Platform)
    - CSWS Assault Rifle (Australia - Assault Rifle - 5.56×45mm NATO)
    - CSWS Battle Rifle (Australia - Battle Rifle / Light Machine Gun - 7.62×51mm NATO)
    - CSWS Shotgun (Australia - Shotgun - 12 Gauge)
    - CSWS Submachine Gun (Australia - Submachine Gun - 9×19mm Parabellum)
- BSW Model 1 (Germany - Anti-Tank Rifle - 15mm)
- BTS-203 (Thailand - Underslung Grenade Launcher - 40×46mm SR)
- BUL Transmark
  - Pistols
    - BUL M5 (Israel - Semi-Automatic Pistol - 9×19mm Parabellum, 9×21mm IMI, 9×23mm Winchester, .40 S&W, .45 ACP: Colt M1911 Variant)
- BUL M5 Classic 1911 (Israel - Semi-Automatic Pistol - 9×19mm Parabellum, 9×21mm IMI, .40 S&W, .45 ACP)
- BUL M5 Classic C1911 (Israel - Semi-Automatic Pistol - 9×19mm Parabellum, 9×21mm IMI, .40 S&W, .45 ACP)
- BUL M5 Classic G1911 (Israel - Semi-Automatic Pistol - 9×19mm Parabellum, 9×21mm IMI, .40 S&W, .45 ACP)
- BUL M5 Classic U1911 (Israel - Semi-Automatic Pistol - 9×19mm Parabellum, 9×21mm IMI, .40 S&W, .45 ACP)
- BUL M5 Government (Israel - Semi-Automatic Pistol - 9×19mm Parabellum, 9×21mm IMI, 9×23mm Winchester, .40 S&W, .45 ACP)
- BUL M5 Commander (Israel -Semi-Automatic Pistol- 9×19mm Parabellum, 9×21mm IMI, 9×23mm Winchester,.40 S&W, .45 ACP)
      - BUL M5 SAS (Israel - Semi-Automatic Pistol - 9×19mm Parabellum, 9×21mm IMI, .40 S&W, .45 ACP)
      - BUL M5 Carry (Israel - Compact Semi-Automatic Pistol - 9×19mm Parabellum, 9×21mm IMI, .40 S&W, .45 ACP)
    - BUL Cherokee (Israel - Semi-Automatic Pistol - 9×19mm Parabellum)
      - BUL Cherokee Compact (Israel - Compact Semi-Automatic Pistol - 9×19mm Parabellum)
      - BUL Cherokee FS (Israel - Semi-Automatic Pistol - 9×19mm Parabellum)
    - BUL Storm (Israel - Semi-Automatic Pistol - 9×19mm Parabellum)
- Bundeswehr Small Arms Designations
  - Rifles
    - G22 (Germany/United Kingdom of Great Britain and Northern Ireland - Bundeswehr/Accuracy International - 2001 - Bolt-Action Sniper Rifle - .300 Winchester Magnum: German variant of the Accuracy International Arctic Warfare Magnum Folding bolt-action sniper rifle. Features telescopic sights made by Carl Zeiss AG.)
    - G24 (Germany/United Kingdom of Great Britain and Northern Ireland - Bundeswehr/Accuracy International - 2000 - Bolt-Action Anti-Materiel Rifle - .50 BMG: German variant of the Accuracy International Arctic Warfare .50 bolt-action anti-materiel rifle.)
    - G25 (Germany/United Kingdom of Great Britain and Northern Ireland - Bundeswehr/Accuracy International - 2002 - Bolt-Action Sniper Rifle - 7.62×51mm NATO, .308 Winchester: German variant of the British Accuracy International Arctic Warfare Covert bolt-action sniper rifle. In service with the special forces unit Kommando Spezialkräfte.)
- Burnside Carbine (US - Breech-Loaded Carbine - Burnside Brass Cartridge)
- Bushmaster Firearms International
  - Pistols
- Bushmaster Arm Pistol(US - Semi-Automatic Pistol - 5.56×45mm NATO)
  - Rifles
- Bushmaster ACR (US, Poland - Semi-Automatic Rifle - 5.56×45mm NATO: Magpul Masada Civilian Variant)
- Bushmaster ACR DMR (US, Poland - Designated Marksman Rifle - 5.56×45mm NATO)
- Bushmaster DCM (US - Semi-Automatic Rifle - 5.56×45mm NATO)
- Bushmaster DCM-XR (US - Semi-Automatic Rifle - 5.56×45mm NATO)
- Bushmaster XM-15 (US - Semi-Automatic Carbine - 5.56×45mm NATO, .223 Remington)
- Bushmaster M4 Type Carbine (US - Semi-Automatic Carbine - 5.56×45mm NATO, .223 Remington)
- Bushmaster 7.62×39mm Carbine(US - Semi-Automatic Carbine - 7.62×39mm)
- Bushmaster M4 Type Post-Ban Carbine(US - Semi-Automatic Carbine - 5.56×45mm NATO)
- Bushmaster M4A2 Carbine (US -Semi-Automatic Carbine- 5.56×45mm NATO)
- Bushmaster M4A3 Carbine (US - Semi-Automatic Carbine - 5.56×45mm NATO)
- Bushmaster Patrolman's Carbine (US - Semi-Automatic Carbine - 5.56×45mm NATO)
- Bushmaster SPC Carbine (US - Semi-Automatic Carbine - 6.8mm Remington SPC)
- Bushmaster M17 (US - Semi-Automatic Rifle - 5.56×45mm NATO)
- Bushmaster M17A1 (US - Semi-Automatic Rifle - 5.56×45mm NATO)
- Bushmaster M17A2 (US - Semi-Automatic Rifle - 5.56×45mm NATO)
      - Bushmaster M17A3 (US - Semi-Automatic Rifle - 5.56×45mm NATO)
- Bushmaster M17A4 (US - Semi-Automatic Rifle - 5.56×45mm NATO)
- Bushmaster M17 Sniper (US - Semi-Automatic Sniper Rifle - 5.56×45mm NATO)
      - Bushmaster M17S (US - Semi-Automatic Rifle - 5.56×45mm NATO)
    - Bushmaster V Match 20 (US - Semi-Automatic Rifle - 5.56×45mm NATO)
      - Bushmaster V Match 16 (US - Semi-Automatic Carbine - 5.56×45mm NATO)

== See also ==
- List of firearms by era
  - List of pre-20th century firearms
  - List of World War II firearms
- List of firearms by country
  - List of modern Russian small arms
- Lists of firearms by actions
  - List of blow forward firearms
  - List of delayed blowback firearms
- List of firearms by type
  - List of assault rifles
  - List of battle rifles
  - List of carbines
  - List of firearm brands
  - List of flamethrowers
  - List of machine guns
  - List of multiple-barrel firearms
  - List of pistols
  - List of shotguns
  - List of sniper rifles
  - List of submachine guns
- List of firearm cartridges
  - List of handgun cartridges
  - List of rifle cartridges
- List of semi-automatic firearms
  - List of semi-automatic pistols
  - List of semi-automatic rifles
  - List of semi-automatic shotguns
  - List of most-produced firearms
