= BDA =

BDA may refer to:

== Businesses or groups ==
- Banco de Desenvolvimento de Angola
- Banco Delta Asia, a bank in Macau suspected of harboring North Korean financial assets
- Bangalore Development Authority
- BDA China Limited, is a business advising firm based in Beijing, China
- Bhubaneswar Development Authority, agency responsible for the development of Bhubaneswar, Orissa, India
- Bohol Deaf Academy, Philippines
- British Deaf Association
- British Dental Association
- British Dietetic Association, a professional association and trade union for dietitians in the United Kingdom
- British Dragon Boat Racing Association, UK governing body for dragon boat racing as a sport and recreation
- Bund Deutscher Architekten or Association of German Architects
- Bundesvereinigung der Deutschen Arbeitgeberverbände or Confederation of German Employers' Associations
- Business Daily Africa, an English-language daily business newspaper published in Kenya.
- Beijing Economic-Technological Development Area

== Science / Technology ==
- Beaver Dam Analog or Analogue, a man-made structure that mimics a beaver's dam to regenerate areas suffering from desertification
- Benzylideneacetone, an organic compound
- Bi-directional amplifier
- Blu-ray Disc Association, responsible for developing and promoting the Blu-ray Disc
- Brazilian Decimetric Array, a radio interferometer telescope
- Broadcast Driver Architecture, a Microsoft Windows technology used by MediaPortal to allow multiple tuner drivers
- Cosworth BDA, a Cosworth-developed Ford Motorsport engine

== Military ==
- Battle damage assessment, or bomb damage assessment
- Browning BDA (disambiguation), name given to a number of different handguns

== Other uses ==
- L.F. Wade International Airport, formerly Bermuda International Airport (IATA code: BDA) – the airport serving the island of Bermuda
