= Duncan Clark =

Duncan Clark is the name of:

- Duncan Clark (athlete) (1915–2003), Scottish Olympic athlete
- Duncan Clark, chairman of BDA China Limited
- Duncan W. Clark (1910–2007), American public health expert and preventive medicine specialist
- Duncan Clark (surgeon) (1759–1808), loyalist in Halifax, Nova Scotia
