= Bushmaster bullpup =

Bushmaster bullpup may refer to:

- Bushmaster M17S, a bullpup rifle
- Bushmaster Arm Pistol, a bullpup pistol
