= Beretta Stampede =

- Type: Revolver
- Place of origin: Italy

Production history
- Manufacturer: Fabbrica D' Armi Pietro Beretta S.p.A.
- Variants: see variants

Specifications
- Barrel length: 3.5 in (89 mm) to 5.5 in (140 mm)
- Cartridge: .45 Long Colt, .357 Magnum (Stampede deluxe)
- Action: single-action revolver
- Feed system: 6 round Cylinder
- Sights: Fixed front sight

The Beretta Stampede is a single-action revolver manufactured by Beretta that is a close clone of the Colt Single Action Army "Peacemaker". The main difference is that the Beretta utilizes a transfer bar like the Ruger Vaquero, allowing it to be carried safely with all six chambers loaded.

== Variants ==
=== Stampede Old West ===
This is the second Stampede. It has a fixed front sight, wood grip, and holds .45 Long Colt rounds, the same as the Colt Peacemaker. It has a 4 3/4 or 5 1/2 inch barrel, which makes the total length 9.5 inches or 11 inches. Its cylinder capacity is six rounds, as are the others.

=== Stampede Old West Marshal ===
This was the third model of the Stampede series by Beretta. It was made for those who wanted a shorter version of the revolver. It has a fixed front sight and a polished wood "bird's head" style grip. It was available chambered in both the .45 Long Colt and .357 Magnum cartridges. The gun is 8 1/4 inches long, and its barrel is 3 1/2 inches.

=== Stampede Buntline Carbine ===
This is probably the most major of changes in the Stampede revolver line, and features a very long 18" barrel and a wood shoulder stock. It still is single-action with fixed sights, holding six .45 Long Colt cartridges. It is 34 inches long. (One must be careful when firing this or any revolving rifle, because of the side-blast at the junction of cylinder and barrel.)

=== Stampede Gemini ===
This model of the Stampede was made for people who prefer larger-framed revolvers. It is in a dimmer shade of silver, and has a darker-colored wood grip and a larger frame than the regular Stampede Old West. It has a fixed front sight with a 5 1/2-inch barrel and 11 inches total length, and holds six 45 Long Colt cartridges.

=== Stampede Philadelphia ===
This is a heavier model of the Stampede Old West, with smooth walnut grips. It weighs about 1/2 pound more than the Stampede Old West, 3.76 pounds (60 ounces) unloaded.

=== Stampede Deluxe ===
This is a more exclusive version of the Stampede Old West. This revolver is also available in .357 Magnum, but both models hold six rounds. It has three different barrel lengths, 4 3/4, 5 1/2 and 7 1/2 inches. It has walnut grips and a fixed front sight.

=== Stampede Inox ===
This is a standard Stampede Old West with an Inox finish. This gun has a black polymer grip, and the rest of it is stainless steel. It takes six .45 Long Colt cartridges. It has a fixed front sight and a 5 1/2" barrel. It comes with a 4 and 3/4" barrel as well. It also takes .45 Colt cartridges.

=== Stampede Bisley ===
This is a model of the Stampede with a bent-down polymer or walnut grip like the original Bisley Colts. It is popular with people who want a closer reach to the trigger, which this bent-down grip provides; the revolver also is less prone to twisting upward in the hand when fired, making it better for target shooters. It has a fixed sight and a 5 1/2" barrel, and uses .45 Long Colt cartridges.

=== Stampede ===
This is the original Stampede. It is available in a blued finish, nickel finish, or Inox. It has a 5 1/2" barrel, a fixed front sight and wood, walnut or polymer grips.

== See also ==
- Beretta Laramie
- Colt Peacemaker
