= Browning BDA =

Browning BDA may refer to:

- FN HP-DA, also known as Browning BDA9 or Browning Hi-Power BDA
- SIG-Sauer P220, also sold as Browning BDA .45 ACP in United States circa late 1970s
- Browning BDA 380, also known as FN 140DA, a derivative of the Beretta Cheetah
