= Geoffrey Boothroyd =

British firearms expert (1925–2001)

Geoffrey Boothroyd (1925 – 20 October 2001) was a British expert on firearms who wrote several standard reference works on the subject. He provided weapons advice to author Ian Fleming for the James Bond novels and their film adaptions. The Bond character Q was initially named after Boothroyd.

== Career ==
Boothroyd was born in Blackpool and employed by Imperial Chemical Industries in the manufacture of ammunition.

== James Bond ==
Boothroyd read Ian Fleming's early James Bond novels and wrote a letter in May 1956 to Fleming professing admiration for the character of James Bond, but not his choice of weapons. Boothroyd was particularly critical of Bond's sidearm, the .25 calibre Beretta, which he described as "really a lady's gun". Fleming responded to Boothroyd, and their subsequent correspondence about weaponry has been published multiple times. Fleming had previously thought the subject of guns to be dull and uninteresting, but responded enthusiastically to Boothroyd's suggestions.

Boothroyd initially suggested that Bond should use a revolver, but Fleming preferred a semi-automatic pistol because it would be easier to conceal. Boothroyd proposed a compromise solution of the 7.65mm Walther PPK, which provided higher stopping power than the Beretta and had a double action, allowing a more rapid first shot after drawing from a holster. Fleming adopted this suggestion, giving Bond a PPK in the novel Dr. No (1958). The choice of the PPK directly influenced that gun's popularity and notoriety. The novel also contains a character named "Major Boothroyd" who issues Bond with the weapon (the real Boothroyd held no military rank). Boothroyd also advised Fleming on the use of silencers and suggested various firearms for use by Bond and other characters. In the first James Bond film, Dr. No (1962), Major Boothroyd is played by Peter Burton; subsequent films renamed the character as 'Q'.

For the cover of the novel From Russia, with Love (1957), Fleming wanted a design incorporating a pistol and a rose. Boothroyd posted his own weapon to illustrator Richard Chopping for use on the cover: a .38 Smith & Wesson snubnosed revolver, modified by removing a third of the trigger guard. Boothroyd was questioned by police when a similar weapon was used in a triple murder in Glasgow; the revolver was determined to be unrelated and Peter Manuel was later arrested, convicted and executed for the murder.

In 1964, the BBC broadcast a television documentary about Boothroyd's influence on Bond's weapons, entitled The Guns of James Bond. It was introduced by the Bond actor Sean Connery, filmed in costume on the set of Goldfinger (1964), and featured demonstrations of the weapons by Boothroyd in his home and on a firing range. The documentary was later re-released on the Dr. No Ultimate Edition DVD and is available on the BBC website.

== Books ==
Boothroyd wrote over a dozen books about firearms, beginning with A Guide to Gun Collecting (1961) and Guns Through the Ages (also 1961). His last original book was The British Over and Under Shotgun, published posthumously in 2004 and co-authored with Susan Boothroyd. Several of his textbooks have continued to be revised and issued as new editions after his death.
