= Beretta Cheetah =

Type of semi-automatic pistol

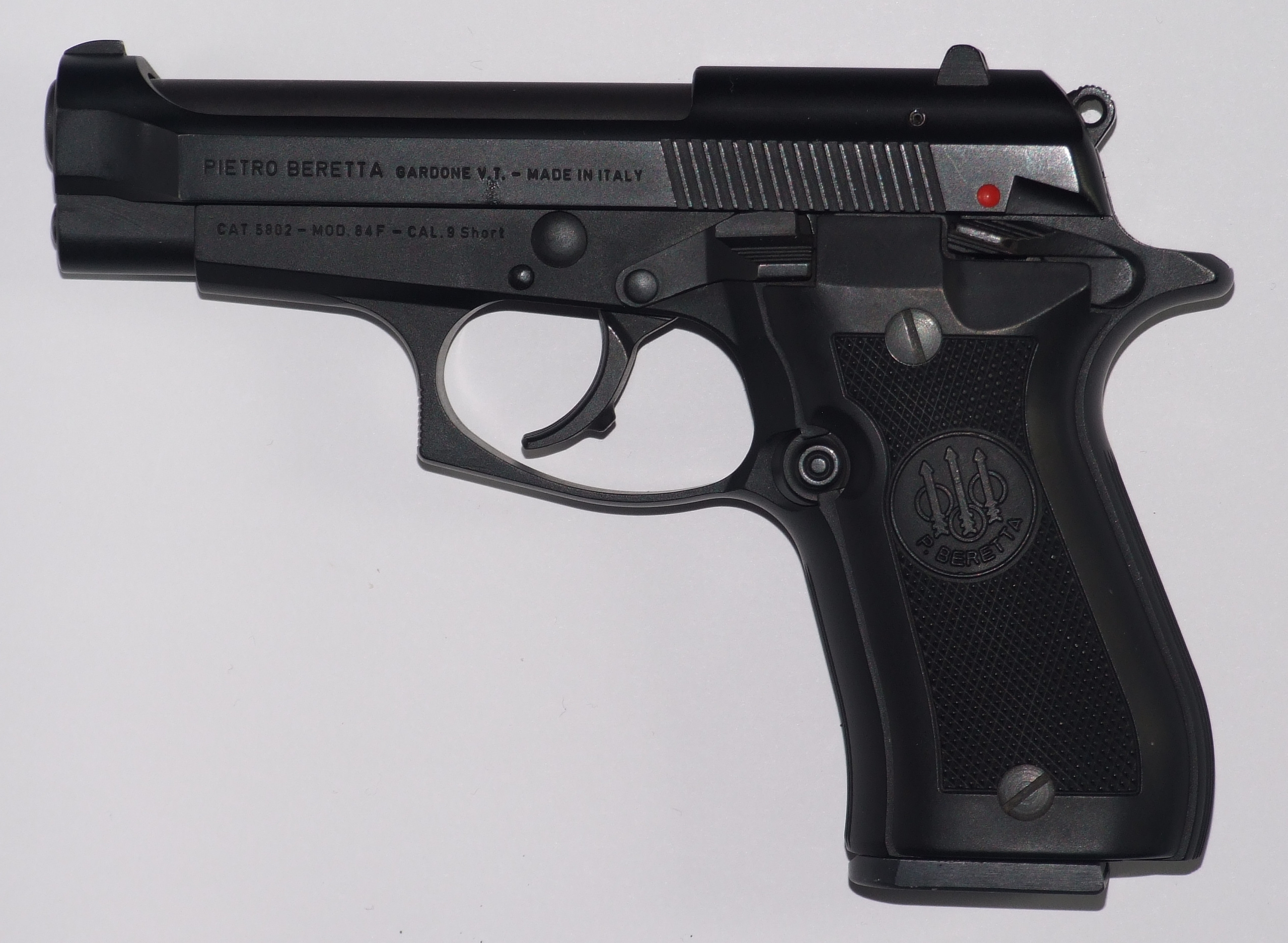
- The Beretta 84FS Cheetah.
- Type: Semi-automatic pistol
- Place of origin: Italy

Service history
- Wars: Lebanese Civil War; Algerian Civil War

Production history
- Manufacturer: Beretta
- Produced: 1976–2017; 2023–present (80X only)

Specifications
- Mass: 81FS: 685 g/24.2 oz; 82FS: 630 g/22 oz; 83FS: 640 g/23 oz; 84FS: 660 g/23 oz; 85FS: 620 g/22 oz; 86FS: 660 g/23 oz; 87BB: 570 g/20 oz; 87 Target: 835 g/29.5 oz; 89: 1,160 g/41 oz; 80X: 709 g/25.0 oz
- Length: 172 mm/6.8 in: 81, 82, 84, 85, 87; 177 mm/7.0 in: 83; 185 mm/7.3 in: 86; 225 mm/8.9 in: 87 Target; 240 mm/9.45 in: 89; 175 mm/6.9 in: 80X
- Barrel length: 97 mm/3.8 in: 81, 82, 84, 85, 87; 102 mm/4.0 in: 83; 111 mm/4.4 in: 86; 150 mm/5.9 in: 87 Target; 152 mm/6.0 in: 89; 99 mm/3.9 in: 80X
- Cartridge: .32 ACP: 81, 82, 80X; .380 ACP: 83, 84, 85, 86, 80X; .22 LR: 87, 87 Target, 89
- Action: Blowback
- Feed system: Detachable box magazine of capacity: 7 rounds: 83; 8 rounds: 85, 86, 87, 89; 9 rounds: 82; 10 rounds: 87 Target; 12 rounds: 81; 13 rounds: 84, 80X

The Beretta Cheetah, also known as the 80 Series and originally known as the Series 81, (Note: The 81 was the first model introduced, and older Beretta literature uses "Series 81" nomenclature to reflect this; however, other sources have long referred to the pistols as the "80 series", and Beretta also adopted this nomenclature with the 80X. The official Beretta website uses the term "80 series" for the Cheetah line.) is a line of compact blowback operated semi-automatic pistols designed and manufactured by Beretta of Italy. They were introduced in 1976 and include models in .32 ACP (Models 81 and 82), .380 ACP (9 mm Short) (Models 83, 84, 85, 86, and 80X) and .22 LR (Models 87, 87 Target and 89). Production paused in 2017, but Beretta revived the marque in 2023 with the release of the 80X (an updated version of the 84) first chambered in .380 ACP (9mm Short) and then later in 2025 a model chambered in .32 ACP (7.65mm Browning) was released.

== Models ==
=== 81 and 82 ===
These two models are chambered for the .32 ACP cartridge. The 81 has a double stacked magazine with 12 round capacity, while the 82 has a single stacked magazine with nine round capacity and resultant thinner grips.

=== 83, 84 and 85 ===
These three models are chambered for the .380 ACP (9 mm Short) cartridge. The 84 has a double stacked magazine with 13 round capacity, while the 83 and 85 have a single stacked magazine with seven and eight round capacity respectively, and resultant thinner grips. The 84 and 85 have a 3.81" barrel, while the 83 has a 4" barrel.

=== 86 ===
Introduced in 1991, the model 86 is chambered for the .380 ACP (9 mm Short) cartridge, but differs significantly from other models in the series, because it has a redesigned front end with a tip-up barrel that hinges at the muzzle to open the breech. This allows the shooter to load a cartridge directly into the chamber, and not have to operate the slide. The 86 uses a single-stack magazine like the 85. Due to low demand, the 86 was discontinued in 2004. Because of its rarity, the 86 demands high prices on the collector's market. In 2023, EAA released a clone of the 86 called the Girsan MC-14T. The MC-14T is very similar to the 86, except it uses a standard 84 double stack magazine instead of the 86's single stack, and has an accessory rail.

=== 87 ===
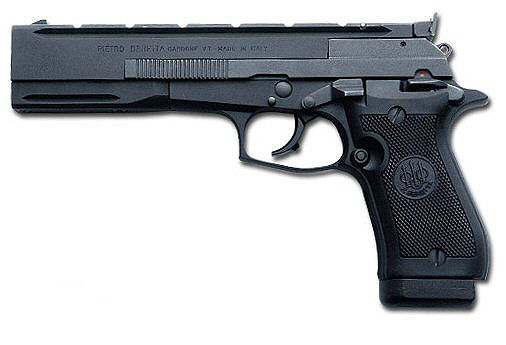
Beretta 87 Target

Introduced in 1977, there are two distinct 87 models both chambered for .22 LR. The standard model is similar to other models, but the 87 Target has a longer barrel and slide, can accept optical sights, and is single action only. The 87 was discontinued in 2013, although it was produced again briefly in 2017. The 87 is considered one of the rarest models.

=== 89 ===
Produced from 1984 to 2012, the model 89 is also chambered for the .22 LR and is designed for competition and range training, with a lightweight frame and ergonomic grips.

=== 80X ===
Introduced in 2023, the 80X is an updated version of the model 84FS chambered for the .380 ACP (9 mm Short) cartridge. It has a Vertec (straight back) grip, reshaped trigger guard, newly designed grip panels, a skeletonized hammer, a Picatinny rail on the frame for accessories like a light or laser, and an optics ready slide. It also has an improved adjustable X-Treme S trigger, removable dovetailed front and rear sights, an easier-to-rack slide with front and rear serrations, and lightened recoil from tuning of the slide weight and spring rates. This gun uses a captive recoil guide rod assembly instead of having separate guide rod and recoil spring parts like prior models. Beretta ships the 80X with magazines that do not have a metal strip across the follower lip that engages the slide catch (similar to MecGar's magazines for the 84). This design helps hollow point bullets feed reliably. 13-round Beretta 84 magazines can be used with the 80X, but FMJ bullets should be used in such instances. New production 80X magazines will work in older 84 guns, but they will not engage the magazine disconnect safety if the gun has one. In addition, Beretta offers the 80X line in different frame finishes, including green, gray and bronze. In 2024, the Beretta 80X Urban Tactical was introduced, which features a threaded barrel and two 15-round extended magazines. In 2025, Beretta introduced the 80X in .32 ACP (7.65mm Browning), which accepts 12-round Beretta 81 magazines. Beretta will also be offering conversion kits that can turn a .380 ACP 80X into one chambered for .32 ACP by simply changing out the barrel and magazine.

== Versions ==
There are potentially five versions for models 81 through 87. The features for each version in models 81, 82, 84 and 85 are consistent between models (i.e., the 81FS, 82FS, 84FS and 85FS all have similar features). This is not the case with models 83, 86, 87 and 89, which were not made in all versions.

=== Base versions (no letter suffix) ===
Base versions of models 81 through 87 are noted for having a rounded trigger guard and generally fewer safety features than subsequent versions. The safety lever is ambidextrous and frame mounted. The frame is alloy, the slide is blued steel and the standard grips are wood. Also, the guide rods and recoil springs are thinner than subsequent versions. The backs of the guide rods are flat, whereas the backs of the guide rods for later versions have a small "nub" or bump.

=== B versions ===
Introduced in 1980, the B versions of models 81, 82, 84, and 85 introduced an automatic firing pin safety, a shorter extractor and grooved front and back straps. The "B" designation means "Brevettato", meaning "patent", referring to a new alteration on the design.

=== BB versions ===
Introduced in 1982, the BB versions of models 81, 82, 84 and 85 have more serrations on the slide as well as white dot and post sights. The guide rod and recoil spring are slightly wider than in previous iterations, and the guide rod has a small "nub" or bump on the back. The "BB" designation means "Brevettato Brevettato", meaning that it is the second alteration to the design. Beretta also produced nickel-plated versions of some of the BB generation.

=== F versions ===
Introduced around 1988, the F versions of models 81, 82, 84 and 85 introduced the "combat" trigger guard with a squared-off front that allows for a finger hold, plastic grips, a proprietary "Bruniton" finish, a chrome-plated barrel and chamber, and a combination safety and decocker lever. Because the F version incorporates Bruniton, a chromed barrel and a squared trigger guard, much like the Beretta 92F, which had been released around the same time, Beretta added the similar F designation to the 84. The "F" means "Federale", or "Federal" in Italian, which was added to the 92 to denote its entry into United States federal government testing.

=== FS versions ===
Introduced around 1990, Beretta improved the decocker mechanism in models 81, 82, 84 and 85 to avoid the levers getting stuck in a "half" position. (The "F" versions could still be fired if the decocker levers were in the "half" position, and the frame area near the levers could be chipped.) The 81FS, 84FS, and 85FS were occasionally available in nickel finishes. The "FS" designation signifies "Sicura" (meaning "safety") in Italian, due to the design's improved safety mechanism.

=== X versions (currently only the 80X) ===
The 80X uses a captive recoil guide rod assembly, a larger beavertail on the back of the frame (to protect against "slide bite"), and a Vertec (straight back) grip.

Beretta has sold factory-painted Bronze and Olive Drab Green models of the 80X in addition to the standard blued model. The "X" suffix is added to the model number to signify its use of the Xtreme-S trigger system, much like the 92X. Beretta has also released a Tactical Urban model with a threaded barrel for suppressor use and an extended 15 round magazine.

== Browning BDA 380 & FN 140 DA ==
From 1977 to 1997, Beretta built the Browning BDA 380, which is essentially the model 84BB with a standard ejection port (instead of an open slide), a slide-mounted decocker/safety, and a spur hammer. Beretta also made the FN 140 DA, which is identical to the BDA 380 except for being marked "Fabrique Nationale" instead of "Browning". The 140 DA was also made in a .32 ACP version.

== Clones ==
Two Turkish companies, Girsan and Tisas, manufacture pistols based on the BB versions of .380 Cheetahs.

Girsan

- MC14BDA: enclosed slide similar to the Browning BDA 380 but with frame-mounted safety
- MC14G84: clone of the Beretta 84B
- MC14T: clone of the Beretta 86 but uses double-stack magazines

Tisas

- Fatih: clone of the Beretta 84BB

== Users ==
- Algeria
- Kazakhstan — since 2007 used as service pistol in private security companies
- Italy - issued to Guardia di Finanza

== Gallery ==
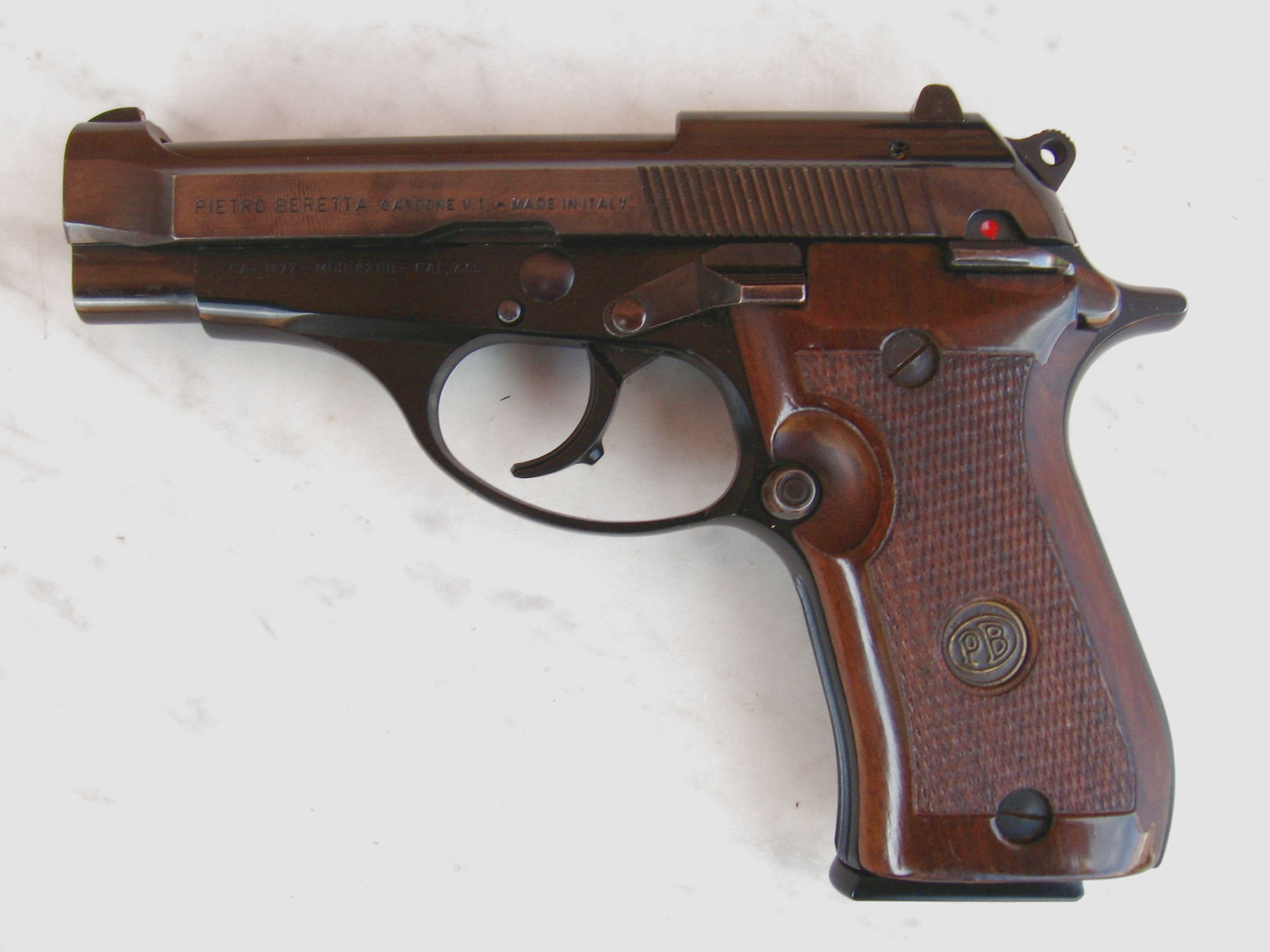
The Beretta 82BB.

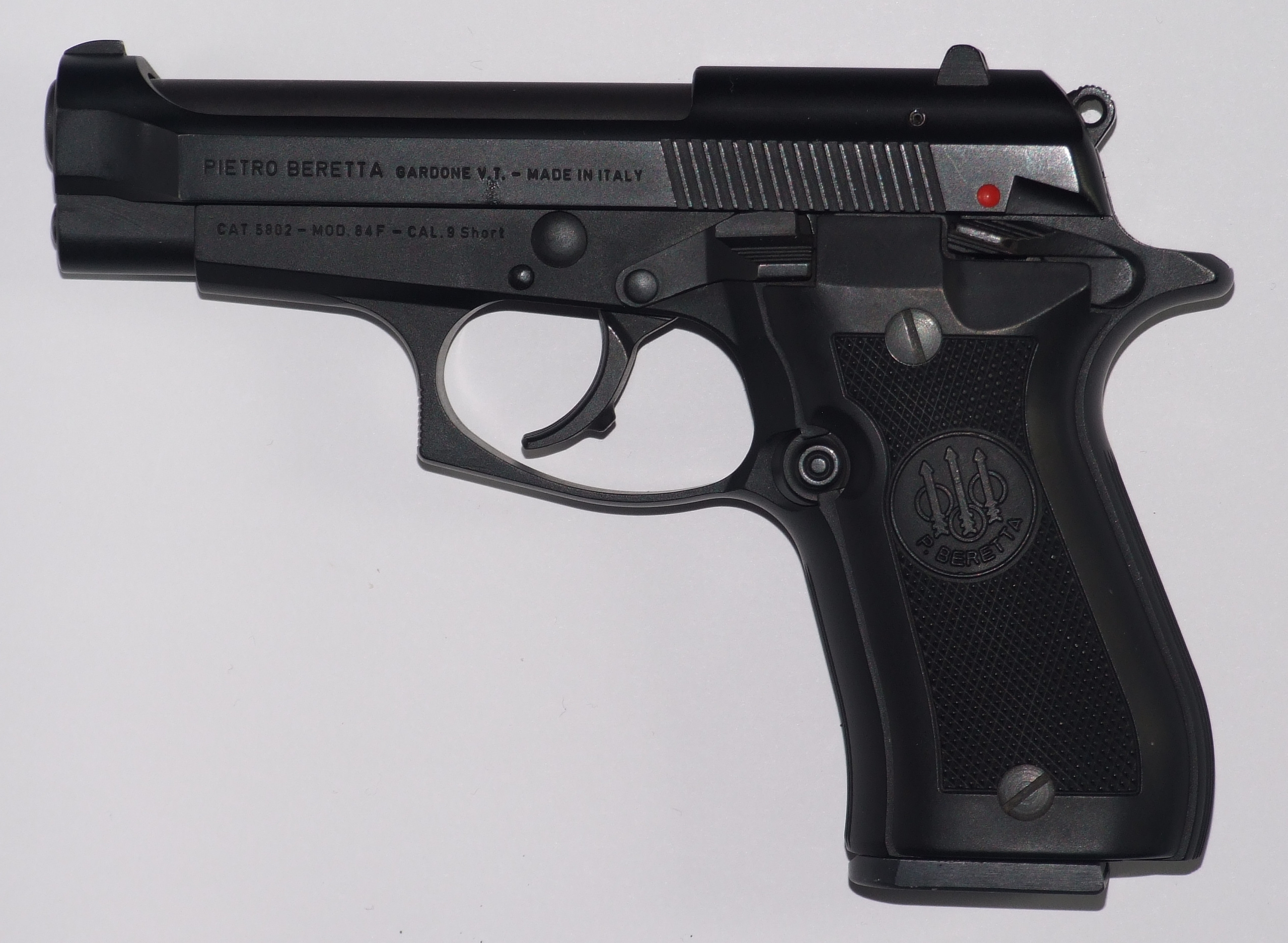
The Beretta 84FS.

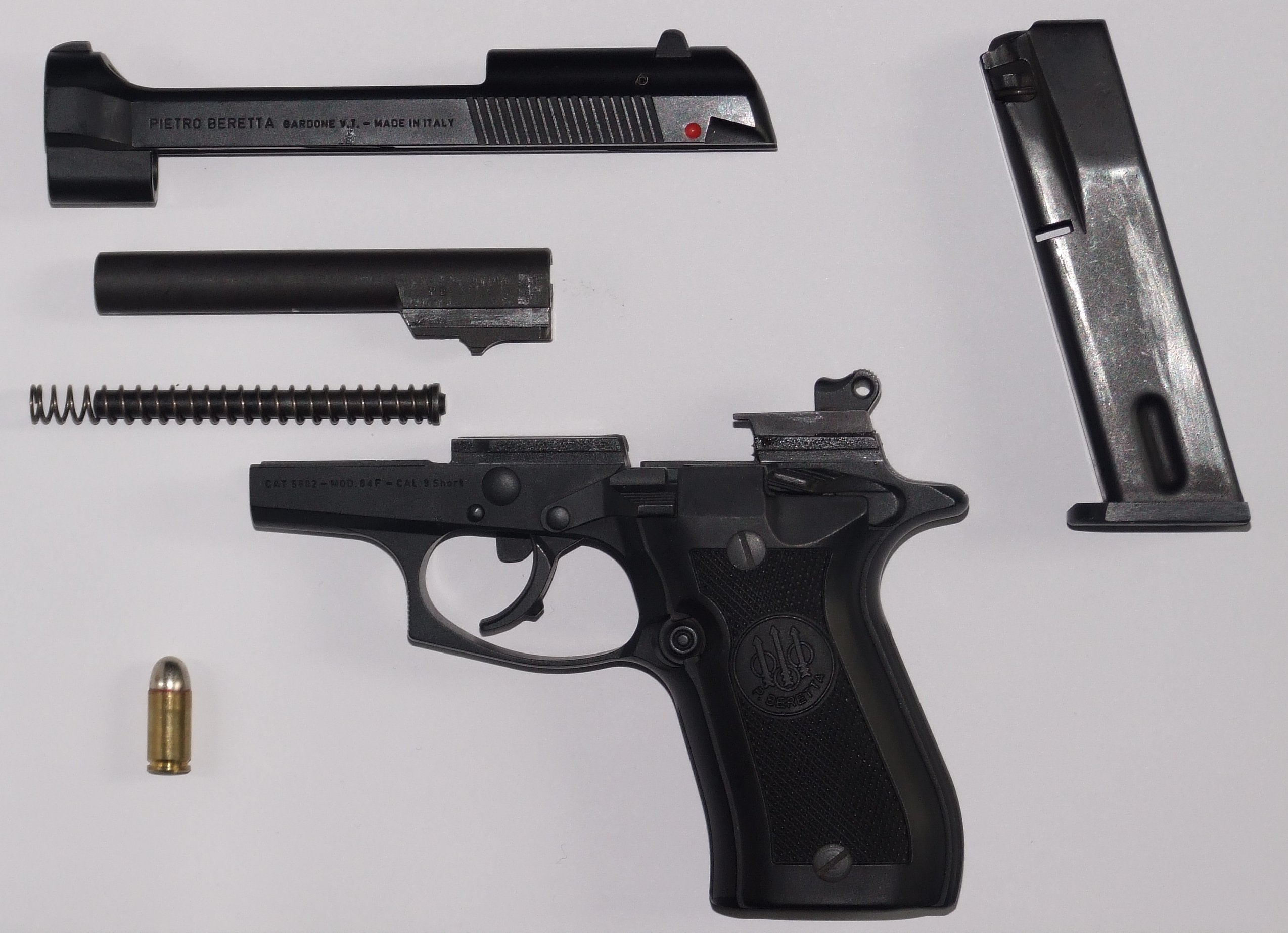
The Beretta 84FS disassembled.

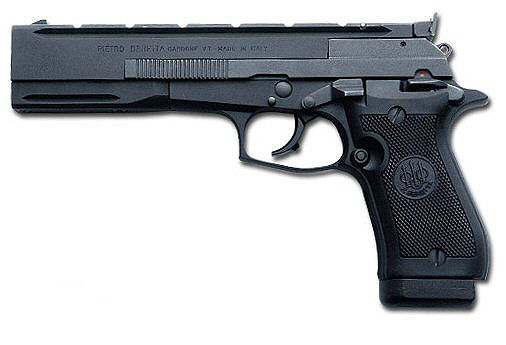
The Beretta 87 Target.
