= Browning BDA 380 =

FN 140DA / Browning BDA 380
- Type: Semi-automatic pistol
- Place of origin: Belgium and Italy

Production history
- Designer: Pietro Beretta S.p.A.
- Designed: 1976
- Manufacturer: Pietro Beretta S.p.A.
- Produced: 1976-1987 (FN 140DA); 1977-1997 (Browning BDA 380)

Specifications
- Mass: 680 g (24 oz)
- Length: 173 mm (6.8 in)
- Barrel length: 97 mm (3.8 in)
- Width: 1.38 in (3.5 cm)
- Height: 122 mm (4.8 in)
- Cartridge: .32 ACP (140DA only).380 ACP
- Action: Blowback

The FN 140DA was a semi-automatic weapon manufactured by Beretta of Italy on behalf of FN Herstal of Belgium. The pistol was sold as the Browning BDA 380 in the United States and Canada.

== Overview ==
The production of this pistol design started in 1976. The new model replaced the FN 1922/Browning 125 in the company's line-up. The pistol is a derivative of the Beretta Model 81 and 84, distinguished by an enclosed slide, a different safety system, and a different hammer.

It was available in .32 ACP and .380 ACP calibers, with the .32 ACP version intended for only European markets.

The .380 version was marketed as the Browning BDA 380 by Browning Arms Company for North American markets. The Browning model is distinguished by its markings, with the right side of the slide being stamped with "Fabrique National Herstal" and the FN logo followed by "Made in Italy" and PB (for Pietro Beretta), and the left side of the slide bearing the marking "Browning Arms Co. Morgan, Utah & Montreal, P.Q."

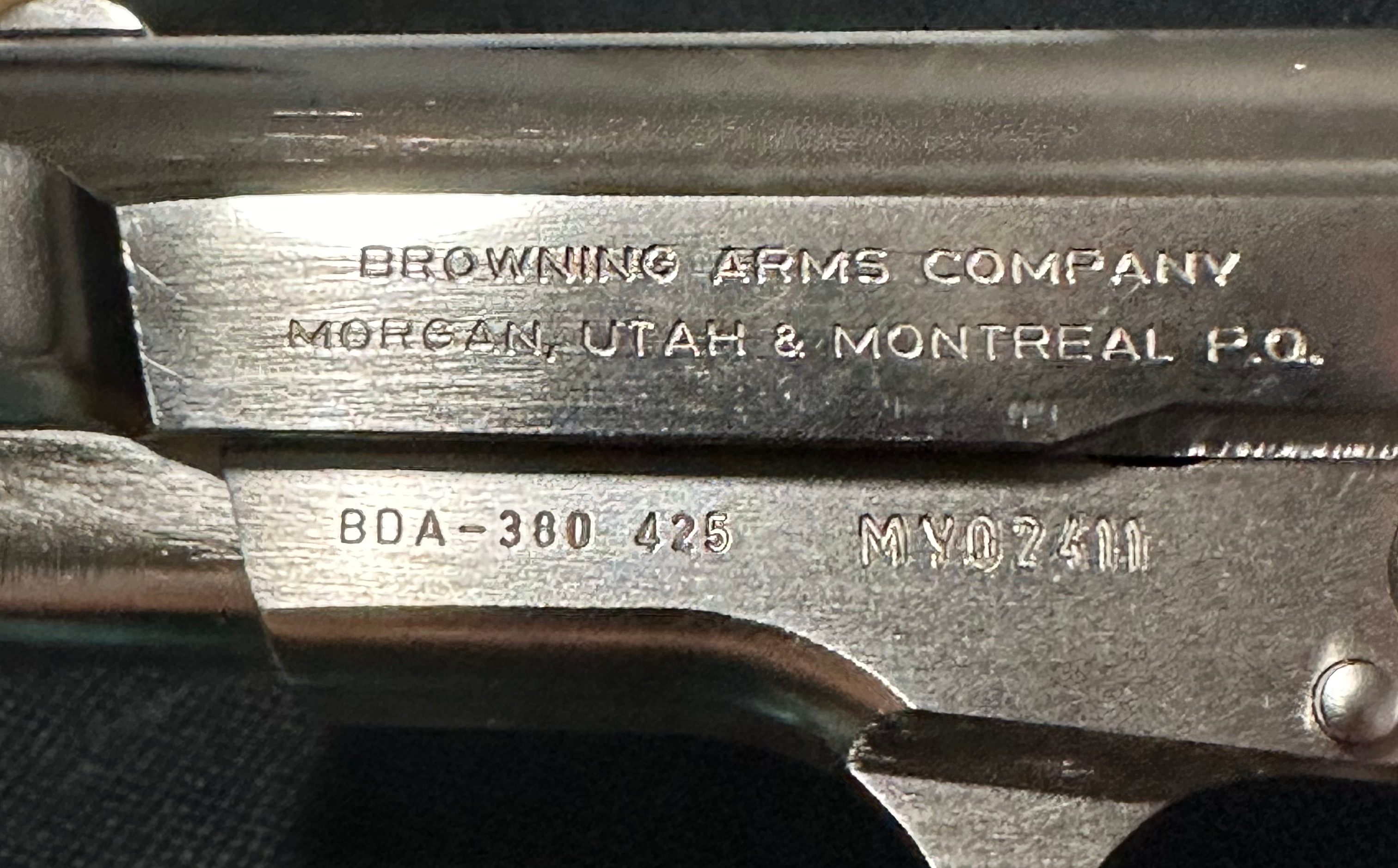
Browning BDA, 2002 Production Date based on serial number

The production of the FN 140DA pistol was discontinued in 1987, while the Browning version was discontinued in 1997. Special limited runs were produced after 1997, however data on the dates and quantity is anecdotal at best. Runs in 2006 and 2009 have also been reported on various internet forums.

== Design ==
The FN 140DA/Browning BDA 380 is a semi-automatic, blowback-operated firearm with a DA/SA (double action/single action) trigger mechanism.

The frame is aluminum, but the slide is steel. The FN 140DA had plastic grips with the FN logo, whereas the Browning BDA 380 had wood grips.

The pistol is fed with double-stacked magazines of 13 (.380 ACP) or 12 (.32 ACP) cartridges, placed in the grip. The magazine release button is located behind the trigger guard.

Some copies were made with a nickel-plated finish.

Despite their mechanical similarities, slides and frames are not interchangeable between the FN 140DA/Browning BDA 380 and their Beretta counterparts.

Beretta manufactured two different versions of the pistol. The Type 1 (or Type I) was produced from 1977 to 1983. The Type 2 (or Type II) was produced from 1983 onwards. The major differences between the two versions are:

- The Type 2 has a wider recoil guide rod with a "bump" or "nub" at the end that engages against the slide release lever
- The Type 2 has a wider/heavier slide to reduce the recoil force
- The Type 2 has wood grips with contoured thumb reliefs at the top near the slide.

(These changes were made roughly around the same time that Beretta replaced the "B" generation of Cheetahs with the "BB" generation.)

== Users ==
- Belgium: Belgian Judicial Police (for female officers) circa 1980.

== See also ==
- Beretta Cheetah

== Notes ==
1. Production of Browning 125 ended in 1980
