= Beretta 418 =

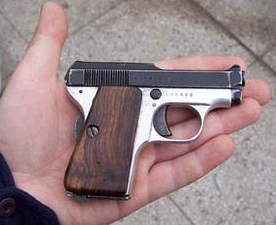
- Beretta 418 with lightweight alloy frame
- Type: Semi-automatic pistol
- Place of origin: Kingdom of Italy

Production history
- Designer: Beretta
- Designed: 1919–1922
- Manufacturer: Beretta
- Produced: 1920s–1950s

Specifications
- Cartridge: 6.35×15mmSR (.25 ACP)
- Action: Straight blowback
- Feed system: Magazine capacity: early models 7, later models 8
- Sights: Fixed iron sights, rear notch and front blade

The Beretta M418 is an easily concealed Italian 6.35 mm (.25 ACP) pocket pistol. The earliest examples were made between 1919 and 1922. There are several versions, including the 1920 (V1 & V2), 1926, 1926 - 31 (V1 & V2), 1934, 318, and 418 models.

== Early models ==
Uncertainty surrounds which year Beretta began producing their first .25 caliber pocket pistols. Dates suggested by various sources range between 1919 and 1922. Design work may have started before the First World War, however the company gave precedence to military requirements so work on the compact 6.35 mm only resumed at the end of the conflict. The first version of the gun was very similar to the Model 1922; nearly a scale model in fact, with the single important difference of a spring-loaded firing pin rather than an internal hammer. Mechanically this change was detrimental; it was probably made due to considerations of size. In every other way the two pistols are identical. They share the trigger mechanism fitted with an escaping disconnector, which is typical of all Beretta pistols of that period. A short time afterward a second version (Model 19) appeared, with an automatic grip safety fitted on the frame backstrap. Presumably the safety was added to make up for the reduced level of safety inherent in guns with a striker-type firing pin.

In 1926 a third version (sometimes known as Model 1926) was introduced, in which the firing mechanism was completely redesigned to incorporate a disconnector similar to that used in the Beretta M1923. This simple and economical modification contributed to the fame and commercial success of the 418. It involved a slight change to the left grip, and can easily be seen without dismantling the gun.

Apart from the 1926 alterations, production continued steadily from the beginning of the 1920s until the middle of the 1930s, when Beretta made further changes. Towards 1935 the appearance of the pistol was deemed outdated, and the handgrip was altered to be similar to the Beretta Model 1934. Later, a cocking indicator was also introduced: an extension of the firing pin protruding from the back of the slide. Otherwise, the so-called small Berettas remained more or less unchanged, in that most of the essential parts (barrel, magazine, etc.) were interchangeable. While changes to the gun during this time were minimal, the name was changed often. These various model numbers can be found only in the Beretta catalogues. All guns manufactured up to the mid-1930s are marked simply, IBREV. 1919. Subsequent models until the end of the war are marked Brevettata. They included their date of manufacture in both the Julian Calendar and Fascist-era based Roman numerals. Similar guns produced immediately after the war can be marked Brevettata, but more often as Brevet.

== Beretta Model 418 ==
The 418 was the final model produced and very successful. Although considered by some underpowered for combat, it found favor with high ranking Italian officers during the Second World War. German command in Rome procured examples; these are distinguishable by a "4UT" proof stamp. The M418 remained in production until the middle of the 1950s, overlapping with production of more sophisticated guns Beretta had developed in the meantime. Towards the end of the 1940s a frame in light alloy was developed. Slight aesthetic modifications were also added shortly afterwards.

The 418 was marketed in the United States as the "Bantam" beginning sometime around 1952. From about 1958, it was marketed as the "Panther." The Panther featured improvements to the Bantam, but the parts are interchangeable.

== In fiction ==
James Bond used a Beretta in the first five novels of the series by Ian Fleming. Bond's pistol is described as "a very flat .25 Beretta (the model number is never specified by Fleming) automatic with a skeleton grip," (i.e. side grip panels removed – frame only), and a threaded barrel to support a suppressor. At the end of the fifth novel, From Russia, with Love, Bond is unable to draw the Beretta at a critical moment when its suppressor catches on the waistband of his trousers, and is very nearly killed as a result. This incident leads to an order from his superior officer, M, to start carrying a new duty weapon in the opening chapters of the sixth novel, Dr. No. Major Boothroyd, the MI6 armorer and "the greatest small-arms expert in the world" in M's opinion, insists that Bond trade it for a weapon with more stopping power. Bond is issued a 7.65mm Walther PPK, and a Smith & Wesson Centennial Airweight revolver for situations where he needs more power than the PPK can offer. He carries both guns during a mission in Jamaica for this novel, but only fires the S&W; in subsequent stories, he relies on the PPK. In the film adaptation of Dr. No, the first in the series, Boothroyd only offers the PPK (in the scene, a larger Walther PP stands in for the mentioned PPK) and Bond reluctantly turns in his Beretta 1919 or 318 or 418* (a larger M34 is standing in for the 1919/318/418).

In reality, Ian Fleming received a fan letter dated May 23rd 1956 from Geoffrey Boothroyd, a Bond enthusiast and gun expert, criticizing the choice of firearm for Bond. Boothroyd called the Beretta "a lady's gun" and suggested several alternatives, one of which was the Walther. Fleming thanked Boothroyd by naming the MI6 armorer in Dr. No after him. In the film, the character of Boothroyd references his real-life counterpart's comments when he describes the Beretta: "Nice and light, in a lady's handbag. No stopping power."

== Series numbers ==
Model number	Serial number range
Mod. 1920 Version I	100000–106000
Mod. 1920 Version II	106000–112000
Mod. 1920 Version III	112000–155000
Mod. 1926	155000–187000
Mod.1926-31	187251–198000
Mod. 1934	603700–608300
Mod. 318	609000–610000
Mod. 418	611000–658016; 10001A–99999A; 00001C–46410C
