= Beretta 92G-SD/96G-SD =

Beretta 92G-SD
- Type: Semi-automatic pistol
- Place of origin: Italy

Production history
- Manufacturer: Beretta
- Produced: 2002 - 2005 Now making limited run again of 500 in 2015

Specifications
- Mass: 1,010 g (36 oz) (unloaded)
- Length: 217 mm (8.5 in)
- Barrel length: 125 mm (4.9 in)
- Width: 39 mm (1.5 in)
- Height: 140 mm (5.5 in)
- Cartridge: 9×19mm Parabellum, .40 S&W
- Caliber: 9 mm, .40
- Muzzle velocity: 381 metres per second (1,250 ft/s) (9×19mm Parabellum)
- Feed system: 10-, 15-, or 17-round box magazine
- Sights: Trijicon 3-dot pressurized tritium gas, self-luminous iron sight

The Beretta 92G-SD and 96G-SD Special Duty handguns are semi-automatic, locked-breech delayed recoil-operated, double/single-action pistols, fitted with the heavy, wide Brigadier slide, chambered for the 9×19mm Parabellum cartridge (92G-SD) and the .40 S&W cartridge (96G-SD), framed with the addition of the tactical equipment rail, designed and manufactured by Beretta.

== History ==
First appearing in 2001, the Beretta 92G-SD and 96G-SD models evolved from the 92G version which was designed specifically for the French "Gendarmerie Nationale" (French military designation of "PAMAS-G1" which was initially manufactured in Italy by Beretta with steel supplied by France, and subsequently manufactured under license from Beretta in France by GIAT; 1987–present) and used also by the "Armée de l'Air" (French Air Force) and other law enforcement agencies. The 96G is the authorized service pistol of the Florida Highway Patrol. Production of the 92G-SD and 96G-SD ceased in 2005. Beretta resumed manufacturing of the 92G-SD in 2015.

== Operation ==
Upon discharge, the pressures created by the expanding gases actuates the slide-barrel assembly in the following manner: after traveling rearward a small distance, the locking block stops the rearward movement of the barrel and releases the slide, which continues its rearward movement. The slide then extracts and ejects the spent cartridge case while compressing the recoil spring (positioned horizontally, directly below the barrel between the parallel guides of the receiver), and simultaneously cocks the hammer. The magazine spring forces the next cartridge up into line. At the apex of the recoil stroke the recoil spring acts to reverse the direction of the slide, chambering a fresh cartridge.

== Specifications ==
Similar to a Beretta 92FS Brigadier and fitted with its heavy, wide slide that had removable front and rear night sights. Because of the heavier slide, the gun's balance was enhanced and felt recoil was reduced, improving accuracy for follow-up shots.

The trigger spring had bends on both ends, so if it broke in the field, it could be taken out and installed "backwards". It acted as its own spare spring.

The 92G-SD & 96G-SD were fitted only with a decocking device (no safety), which, when pressed down, disconnected the trigger, rotated the firing pin away, allowing the hammer to drop without causing an accidental discharge. When released, the decocker levers return to their normal firing position. The pistol was ready to fire at all times. Initially, the Beretta "G" configured guns were sold only to government law enforcement and military agencies.

The 92G-SD & 96G-SD used a frame based on the standard Beretta 92FS frame with the addition of the tactical equipment Weaver rail mount.

Ambidextrous Manual Decocking Lever. Accessible by the thumb of a right- or left-handed shooter, it was spring-loaded. When pushed down, the rear part of the firing pin (striker) rotated out of alignment with the front part of the firing pin.

Night sights. Removable Trijicon 3-dot pressurized tritium gas, self-luminous iron sights for low-light-condition sighting.

Automatic Firing Pin Block. The front part of the firing pin was blocked from any forward movement until the trigger was pulled completely back. Even if the pistol fell and struck the ground, muzzle-down, the firing pin would not strike the primer.

Checkered Grip. The front and back grip straps were machine checkered (25 per inch), whereas the 92FS was vertically serrated. The grip frame was flared slightly at the base to enhance pointability and control.

Extended/Reversible Magazine Release Button. Positioned next to the trigger guard for either right- or left-handed shooters. Allowed rapid reloading. Magazine dropped clear when released.

Double and Single Action. This pistol model fired double-action on the first round and single-action on the subsequent rounds. Squeezing the trigger would cock and trip the hammer, firing the pistol. After the initial shot the pistol would continually fire in single-action. The longer, heavier trigger pull of the double action made inadvertent discharge less likely, while the lighter, shorter single-action trigger pull allowed faster, more precise discharge of subsequent rounds.

The ejector of the 92G-SD had an angle cut into it to eject the empty brass to the right side of the gun. The engineering of the 96G-SD would not allow this design of the ejector, so occasionally a brass would be ejected in a back direction.

Loaded-chamber indicator. The chamber-loaded indicator was visible or could be felt by touch.

Disassembly Latch. Located to simplify field stripping and maintenance, the latch made this model easy and quick to disassemble.

Finish. The exterior finish was called Bruniton, which is a Beretta corrosion resistant non-glare matte finish.

Open Slide Design. The primary role of the open-top slide was to provide a 180° ejection port. Open top slide virtually eliminated jamming or stovepiping. The slide retention device, which caused the slide and barrel assembly to remain open after the last cartridge had been fired and ejected, allowed the user to load the chamber one cartridge at a time (emergency tactical loading) should the magazine be lost or damaged. The pistols were designed so that the extractor would not be damaged by direct chamber loading. These models operated on the short recoil, delayed locking block system, which yielded a faster cycle time.

Plastic parts. Guide Rod, Hammer Spring Cap (w or w/o lanyard), Trigger, Hammer (metal internals), Magazine Release, Take Down Lever, Mag Base.

== Intended market ==
Per Beretta USA, the Beretta 92G-SD was designed for United States Army Special Forces that required a high quality special duty pistol that could be fitted with a tactical light or laser, but also found a market in the home protection area.

== Design advantages ==
The Beretta 92G-SD and 96G-SD with the slide mounted decocking lever is quick into action. The added advantages of night sights and an equipment rail made it an attractive home protection/law enforcement pistol. The barrel was made of stainless steel to protect it from wear and corrosion.

== Technical data – 92G-SD ==
- Type: Beretta 92G-SD
- Trigger system: Double/Single action
- Trigger Pull: Single Action: 4.0 to 6.4 lbf (18 to 28 N) Double Action: 9.9 to 16.1 lbf (44 to 72 N)
- Caliber: 9×19mm Parabellum (9×19mm NATO, 9mm Luger)
- Locking system: falling locking block
- Capacity: 10, 15, or 17 rounds (staggered) depending on magazine
- Frame material: Aircraft-quality aluminium alloy
- Slide material: Carbon steel
- Grip panels: Plastic, checkered
- Barrel length: 125 mm (4.9 in)
- Barrel material: Stainless steel
- Sights: Removable Trijicon 3-dot pressurized tritium gas, self-luminous iron sight
- Rifling: R.H, 6 groove, pitch 250 mm (approx 1 turn in 10 in.)
- Bullet weight: 8.04 grams (124 grains)
- Muzzle velocity: 381 metres per second (1,250 ft/s)
- Muzzle energy: 618 J
- Overall Length: 217 mm (8.5 in)
- Overall Height: 140 mm (5.5 in)
- Overall Width: 39 mm (1.5 in)
- Sight Radius: 160 mm (6.3 in)
- Weight Unloaded: 1,010 g (36 oz)
- Safeties: Slide mounted decocking levers. Loaded chamber indicator. Firing-pin safety. Slide retention device.
- Magazine release: Lower trigger guard, extended, reversible.
- Production years: 2002–present day.
- Production location: Beretta USA

== Technical data – 96G-SD ==
- Type: Beretta 96G-SD
- Caliber: .40 (x 21 mm) S&W
- Slide material: Carbon steel
- Bullet weight: 10.0 grams (154 grains)
- Muzzle velocity: 347 metres per second (1,140 ft/s)
- Muzzle energy: 579 J
- Weight Unloaded: 1,005 g (35.5 oz)

== See also ==
- Beretta 92FS
- Beretta 92FS Brigadier
- Free videos of Beretta 92/96 disassembly
