= BUL M-5 =

BUL M5 Government
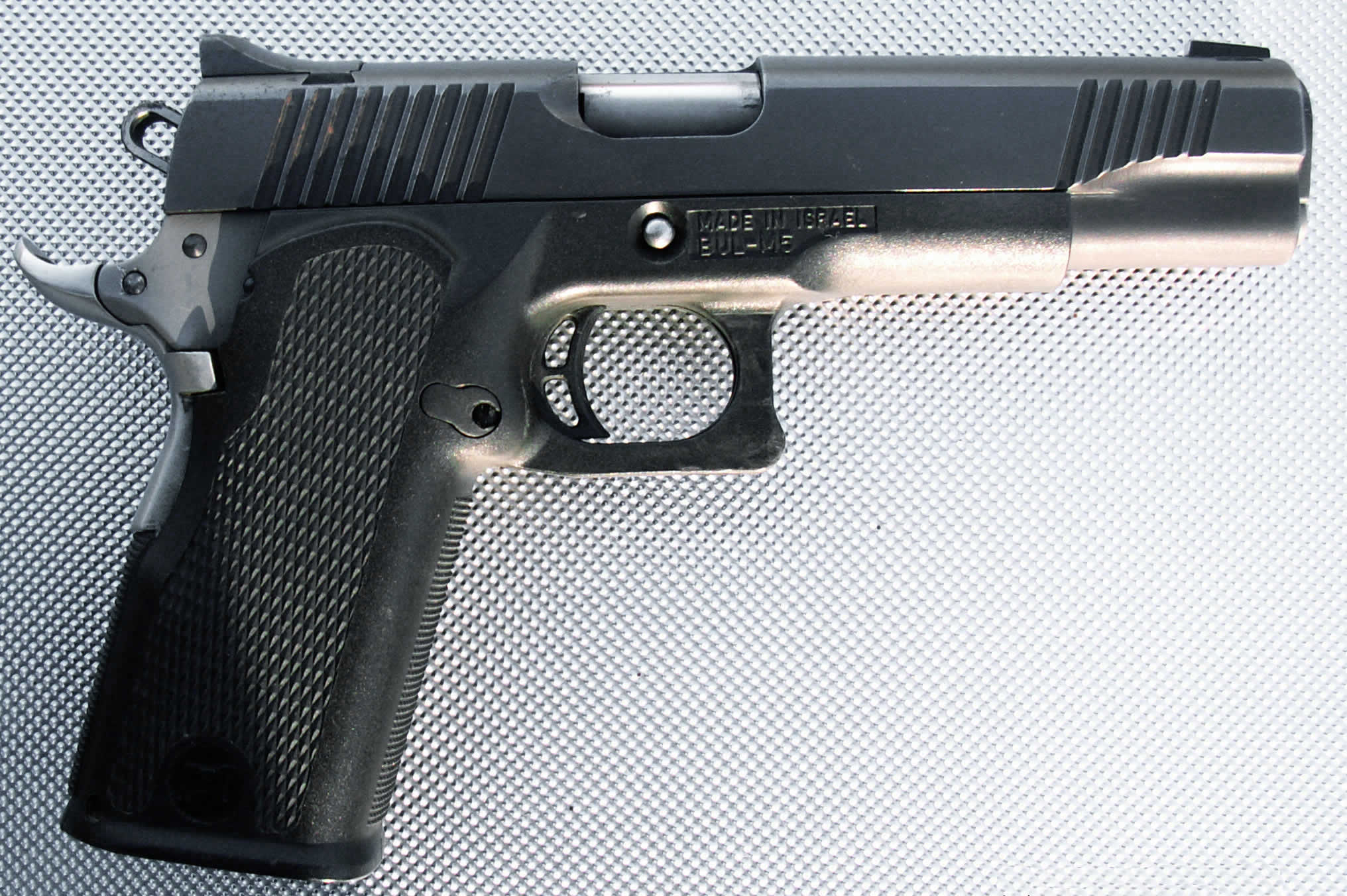
- Bul M5 pistol
- Type: Semi-automatic pistol
- Place of origin: Israel

Production history
- Designed: 1991-1992
- Manufacturer: BUL Transmark
- Produced: 1994–Present
- Variants: M5 Commander (Shorter slide and barrel on same wide body frame.)

Specifications
- Mass: 864g (858g Commander)
- Length: 220mm (200mm Commander)
- Barrel length: 128mm (107mm Commander)
- Cartridge: 9×19mm Parabellum; 9×21mm IMI; 9×23mm Win.38 Super.40 S&W.45 ACP
- Action: Single Action short recoil, locked breech.
- Rate of fire: semi-automatic
- Feed system: 18 (9mm/.38), 17 (.40), or 13 (.45) rounds
- Sights: Drift Adjustable 3-Dot Front blade, rear square notch (Night-Sights Optional)

BUL M5 Carry/Ultra-X
- Type: Semi-automatic pistol
- Place of origin: Israel

Production history
- Manufacturer: BUL Transmark

Specifications
- Mass: 730g
- Length: 175mm
- Barrel length: 80mm
- Cartridge: 9×19mm Parabellum; 9×21mm IMI.38 Super.40 S&W.45 ACP
- Action: Single Action short recoil, locked breech.
- Rate of fire: semi-automatic
- Feed system: 12 (9mm/.38) or 10 (.45) round
- Sights: Drift Adjustable 3-Dot Front blade, rear square notch (Night-Sights Optional)

The BUL M-5 is a.45 ACP pistol made by Israeli firearms manufacturer BUL Transmark.

== Design ==
Based on the M1911, M-5s are made in "carry" models for personal defense and "competition" models for sporting use (particularly IPSC competitions).

The BUL M-5 is specifically designed to compensate for the 1911's heat absorption in high temperature environments with a polymer frame.

BUL also provided the polymer frame to other firearms manufacturers for production of Springfield Armory, Kimber Polymer and Charles Daly Polymer 1911 pistol lines.
