= Bushmaster M17S =

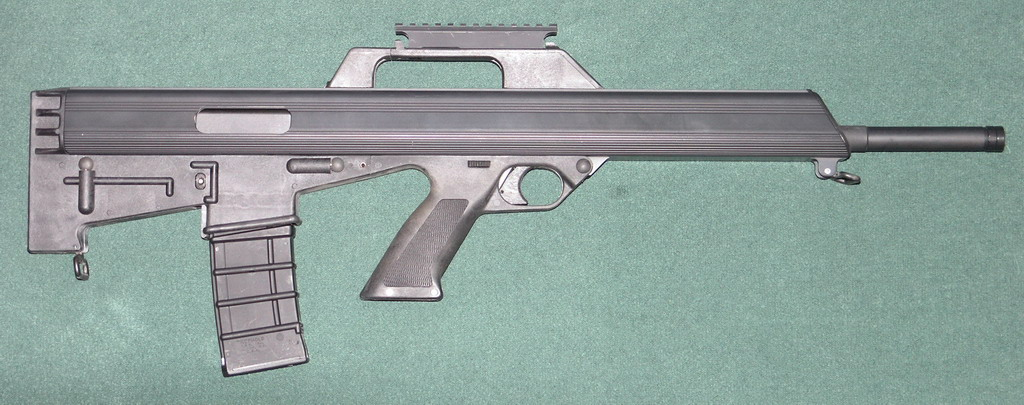
- The Bushmaster M17S rifle
- Type: Bullpup semi-automatic rifle
- Place of origin: Australia/United States

Production history
- Designer: Armtech Ltd.
- Designed: 1992
- Manufacturer: Edenpine; Bushmaster Firearms International
- Produced: 1992–2005 (M17S only, M17S556 Still produced)

Specifications
- Mass: 8.2 lb (3.7 kg)
- Length: 30 in (760 mm)
- Barrel length: 21.5 in (550 mm)
- Cartridge: 5.56×45mm NATO
- Action: Gas-operated rotating bolt
- Feed system: STANAG magazines
- Sights: Iron sights

The Bushmaster M17S is a semi-automatic bullpup rifle that was manufactured by Bushmaster Firearms International from 1992 until 2005.

== History ==
The design of the M17S dates back to 1986 when the Australian company Armtech Ltd. developed the prototype as a prospective military rifle for the Australian Army. Two prototypes were developed, one for the 5.56×45mm NATO, the C60R, and the more revolutionary C30R that used caseless ammunition. The C30R was developed hastily and an out-of-battery ignition resulted in a prototype exploding during a high-profile demonstration.

The Australian Army adopted a licence-built version of the Steyr AUG, leading to the sale of the Armtech design to another Australian company, Edenpine (Edenpine Pty Ltd. Charles St. George, improved the design, resulting in the ART-30 and SAK-30. The salient features of the M17S were in place but some Finnish Valmet parts were used instead of AR-15 parts to reduce costs. Edenpine expressed interest in selling the design on the United States market and subsequently licensed the design to Bushmaster for local manufacture, thus avoiding import restrictions. The rifle was sold from October 1992 to 1994 as the "Edenpine M17S Bull-Pup rifle". The distributor was Edenpine (USA) Inc., headquartered in San Jose, California.

When Edenpine folded in 1994, the totality of the rights passed to Bushmaster, who manufactured it as the "Bushmaster M17S", starting just a few months before the approval of the Federal Assault Weapons Ban. The M17S was the only American-made bullpup rifle to be offered commercially, and the only one not banned by name. The BATF approved a version with a longer barrel sleeve which covered more of the muzzle thread. This made it impossible to securely attach the M16-style "Birdcage" flash hider without modification of the barrel sleeve.

== Design ==
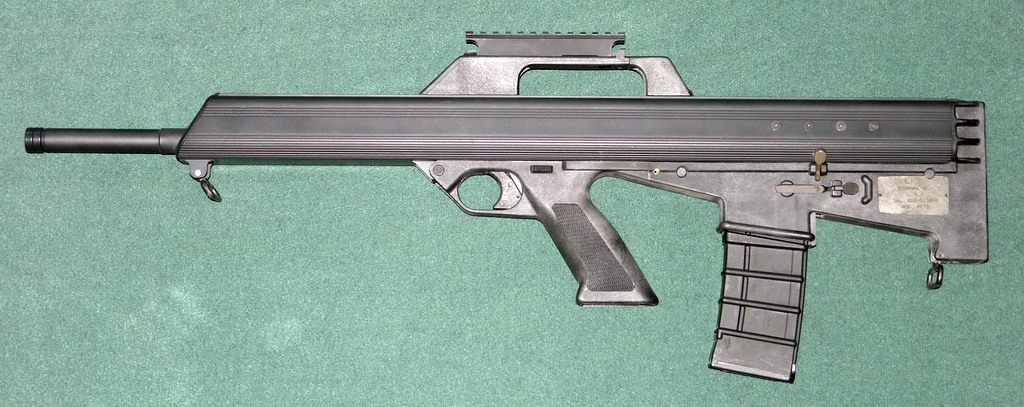
Left side

The Bushmaster M17S is a semi-automatic rifle that uses a gas-operated, rotating bolt. The design takes the operating system of the Armalite AR-18 and moves the pistol grip forward in a manner similar to the British SA80. Instead of the sheet metal receiver of the AR18 and SA80, the Bushmaster M17S uses an extruded 7075-T6 aluminum receiver that serves as the stock and foregrip as well. This method of construction is particularly efficient and was subsequently copied by other designs.

Operation is a short-stroke fixed piston system that is self-compensating. The rifle is chambered in 5.56×45mm NATO and accepts STANAG magazines. The main drawback of the subsequent modified design, reported by some users, was the tendency of its aluminum hand guard to become hot after one or two magazines were emptied in rapid fire. Bushmaster discontinued production of the M17S in 2005.

== Variants ==
A more up to date version is offered by K&M Arms and chambered in at least four calibers.

== See also ==
- List of bullpup firearms
