= Beretta Laramie =

- Type: Revolver
- Place of origin: Italy

Production history
- Manufacturer: Beretta

Specifications
- Barrel length: 5 in (13 cm); 6.5 in (17 cm)
- Cartridge: .45 Long Colt, .38 Special
- Action: Single action
- Feed system: 6 round cylinder
- Sights: Adjustable rear sight, fixed front sight

The Beretta Laramie is a single-action revolver produced by Beretta. It is modeled after the Smith & Wesson New Model 3.

The Laramie has an automatic safety on the hammer consisting of a sliding bar. After each shot, the bar automatically positions itself between the hammer and the frame, preventing accidental discharge. The bar also blocks the barrel releasing device and the rotation of the cylinder. The revolver can be transported safely when the hammer is in the half-cock notch, in this position the cylinder is able to rotate and the barrel can be opened for loading or unloading.
