= BDA China Limited =

Chinese business advertising firm

- BDA China Logo
- Native name: 北京博达克咨询有限公司
- Type: Private
- Industry: Business
- Genre: Inward Investment Firm
- Founded: 1994
- Headquarters: Beijing, China
- Key people: Duncan Clark (Chairman); Wilbur Zou (Managing partner)
- Products: Business services
- Website: www.bda.com

BDA China Limited (BDA) is a business advising firm based in the city of Beijing, China.

== History ==
Founded in 1994, BDA serves financial institutions, mostly private equity firms and hedge funds, and multinational corporations. BDA advises on investments principally in China, as well as South East Asia, Japan and South Korea.

The company's sector focus is principally China's digital markets and consumer goods and services. Other sectors include advanced manufacturing, healthcare, education & training.

After serving exclusively Morgan Stanley and its clients from 1994 to 1995, BDA built its own stable of clients including telecom, media and technology companies seeking to benefit from the rapid growth in China.

In 1999, BDA co-published a report entitled "The Internet in China". The publication coincided with a surge in venture capital investment in the country's budding internet sector culminating in the IPOs on Nasdaq in 2000 of Chinese Internet portals Sina, Netease and Sohu. BDA founder Duncan Clark co-authored a chapter in the textbook Chinese Cyberspace: Technological changes and political effects based on the findings from this report.

In 2003 China's three listed Internet portals started to see a reversal of fortunes from revenues generated by mobile text messaging partnerships with Chinese telecom operators, including China Mobile. BDA research highlighted the resurgence of these companies, winning it new mandates from institutional investors including hedge funds. A new wave of private equity activity followed with the emergence of a 'second wave' of Internet companies such as Ctrip, Baidu and Shanda, that listed successfully in the US in 2003 and 2004.

By 2004, BDA diversified its investments and business consulting practices beyond the telecommunications and internet sectors to include e-commerce and a wide range of consumer goods and services.

BDA was also an angel investor in website software start-up Exoweb limited, which subsequently spun off the mobile games company Happylatte and mobile metrics company App Annie.

== Leadership ==
Duncan Clark, BDA's founder and chairman, is a technology and financial expert specializing in Chinese markets. Clark's book on Alibaba, Alibaba – The House That Jack Ma Built, was published by HarperCollins in 2016 and was named as a finalist for the 2016 Financial Times / McKinsey Business Book of the Year Award.

He is often quoted by The New York Times, Bloomberg, The Economist, and other media outlets.

Clark served a senior advisor to the 'China 2.0' initiative at the Stanford Graduate School of Business, Stanford Program on Regions of Innovation and Entrepreneurship. At Stanford, Clark studies the effect Silicon Valley will have on China's various technology industries. When he served as a visiting scholar from 2010 to 2011, he facilitated seminars on the creation of the venture capital community and the role of internet companies in China.

Duncan is also executive producer of two China-themed documentary films produced by a production company CIB Productions that he co-founded in Beijing in 2008.

Duncan Clark has served on the advisory board of Chinese Internet company Netease and serves on the advisory board of the Digital Communication Fund of Geneva-based bank The Pictet Group.

A former elected chairman of the China–Britain Business Council, Clark was appointed by Her Majesty Queen Elizabeth II Order of the British Empire in the 2013 New Year Honours List for services to British commercial interests in China.

Wilbur Zou, BDA's managing partner, is responsible for the company's business operation and development.

Ted Dean served as partner at BDA from 1999 to 2013 when he joined the United States Department of Commerce as deputy assistant secretary for services in the International Trade Administration.
