= Beretta DT-10 =

Beretta DT-10 Trident
- Type: Double barreled shotgun
- Place of origin: Italy

Production history
- Manufacturer: Beretta
- Produced: 2000–2014

Specifications
- Mass: 8 lbs.
- Barrel length: 28, 30, 32 or 34 inches
- Caliber: 12 gauge

The Beretta DT10, or the Beretta DT11, is an over and under shotgun. It was manufactured, marketed, and distributed by Fabbrica d'Armi Pietro Beretta, in Gardone Val Trompia, Italy. It is one of the few Beretta shotguns that has a trigger unit that is detachable in the field, the DT in its name standing for detachable trigger. It combines features between the older Beretta ASE and the newer Beretta 682 model and is targeted at their competition market.

The DT10 is available in several guises, the base DT10, a DT10L with enhanced engraving and the DT10EELL, a sideplate deluxe version. The mechanicals in each model are identical.

In 2014, the DT10 was replaced by the DT11.
