= Beretta 70 =

Beretta 70 Series
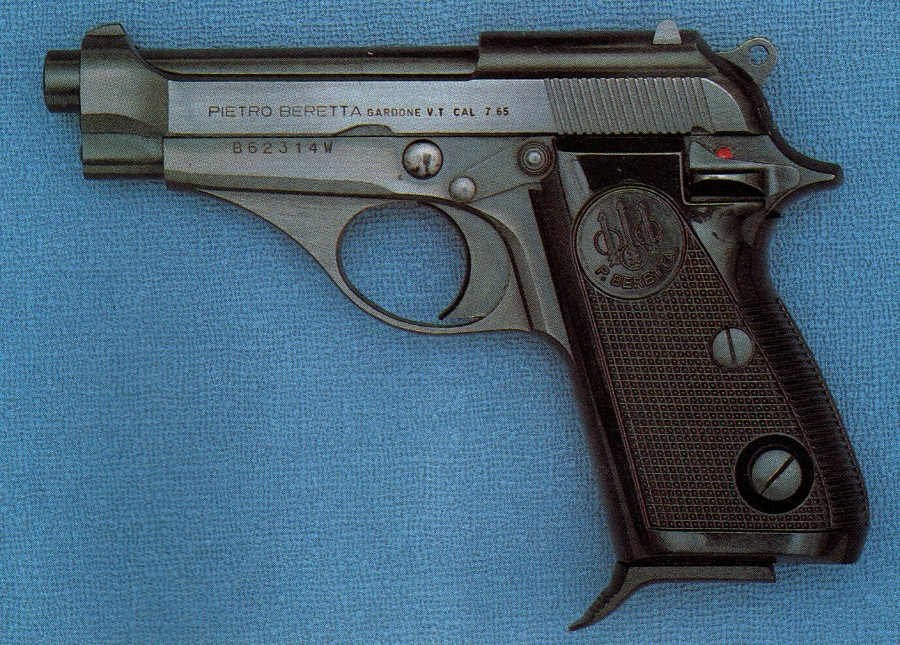
- The Beretta 70 in .32 ACP (7.65mm Browning)
- Type: Semi-automatic pistol
- Place of origin: Italy

Production history
- Manufacturer: Beretta
- Produced: 1958–1985

Specifications
- Mass: 660 grams (23 oz) (70); 480 grams (17 oz) (71); 535 grams (18.9 oz) (72); 550 grams (19 oz) (73); 570 grams (20 oz) (74, 75); 930 grams (33 oz) (76); 990 grams (35 oz) (100)
- Length: 165 millimetres (6.5 in) (70, 71); 225 millimetres (8.9 in) (72); 235 millimetres (9.3 in) (73, 74, 75); 220 millimetres (8.7 in) (70T)
- Barrel length: 90 millimetres (3.5 in) (70, 71, 72); 150 millimetres (5.9 in) (70T, 72, 73, 74, 75); 130 millimetres (5.1 in) (76)
- Height: 123 millimetres (4.8 in) (70, 71); 136 millimetres (5.4 in) (72, 73, 74, 75)
- Cartridge: .32 ACP, .380 ACP, or .22 LR
- Action: Single action
- Feed system: 7, 8, 9, or 10 round detachable magazine
- Sights: Fixed or adjustable

The Beretta 70 is a magazine-fed, single-action semi-automatic pistol series designed and produced by Beretta of Italy, which replaced the earlier 7.65mm Beretta M1935 pistol. Some pistols in this series were also marketed as the Falcon, New Puma, New Sable, Jaguar, and Cougar (not to be confused with the later Beretta 8000, which was also marketed as Cougar). The gun is notable for its appearances in film, and is also the first compact Beretta pistol to feature several improvements commonly found in Beretta pistols for the rest of the century.

== Improvements over previous Beretta pistols ==
The 70 Series improved upon the M1934/M1935 (and the later .22 LR offering of the same as the Model 948) in several ways. The 180-degree swivel-lever safety of the M1934/35 was cumbersome and slow to operate, being almost impossible to rotate with the gun hand. The 70 Series incorporated a cross-bolt safety modeled after that used on the M1951, but this safety was also difficult to operate with a single hand, and could also accidentally be switched on or off depending on the user's grip. After a short time, the Model 70 cross bolt safety was replaced with the thumb-activated, frame-mounted lever safety found on several Beretta pistols between the 1960s and 1980s. The frame grip angle was changed to allow more natural position of the shooting hand when pointing at the target. The trigger was also re-designed to improve (lighten) the average weight of pull required to fire the pistol.

As the replacement for the M1934/5 in Beretta's compact/medium pistol line, the Model 70 integrated the M1951's takedown lever, guide rod system, slide stop, and magazine release button in the lower part of the grip. Initially, the Model 70 used the slide hold-open feature of the M1934/5. This utilized the magazine follower to physically block the slide from closing on an empty magazine. Removing the magazine caused the slide to slam forward into battery, unless the operator engaged the thumb safety. This process increased reloading time considerably. The follower hold-open was eventually replaced in Series 70 production with an improved dedicated slide stop, a feature again derived from the M1951 service pistol. Midway through production, the slide stop release lever was altered from the "pedal" style release used on the M1951 to a round button mounted slide stop lever. The trigger guard was also redesigned with a longer taper to improve the pistol's appearance. Later, in order to meet U.S. pistol import regulations under the 1968 Gun Control Act, a thumb shelf was added to the Model 70s left grip panel.

The magazines retain the spur at the front of the floor plate, common to both the M1934/5 and M1951, as is common for many pistols with a European-style magazine release (a hinged latch in the bottom of the grip against the magazine's floor plate), and also some compact pistols as a means of extending the grip surface while reducing the overall profile of the firearm.

== Models ==
=== 70 ===
The original Model 70, also known as the "Puma", was offered in .32 ACP caliber and incorporated a cross-bolt safety. The pistol was fitted with brown plastic wrap-around grip panels.

=== 70s ===
The Beretta 70s utilized a steel frame. Available in .22LR, .32 ACP, and .380 ACP calibers, the 70s introduced a conventional thumb-operated safety on the left side of the frame. Later export (U.S.A.) models were equipped with grips featuring a prominent left thumb rest.

=== 71 ===
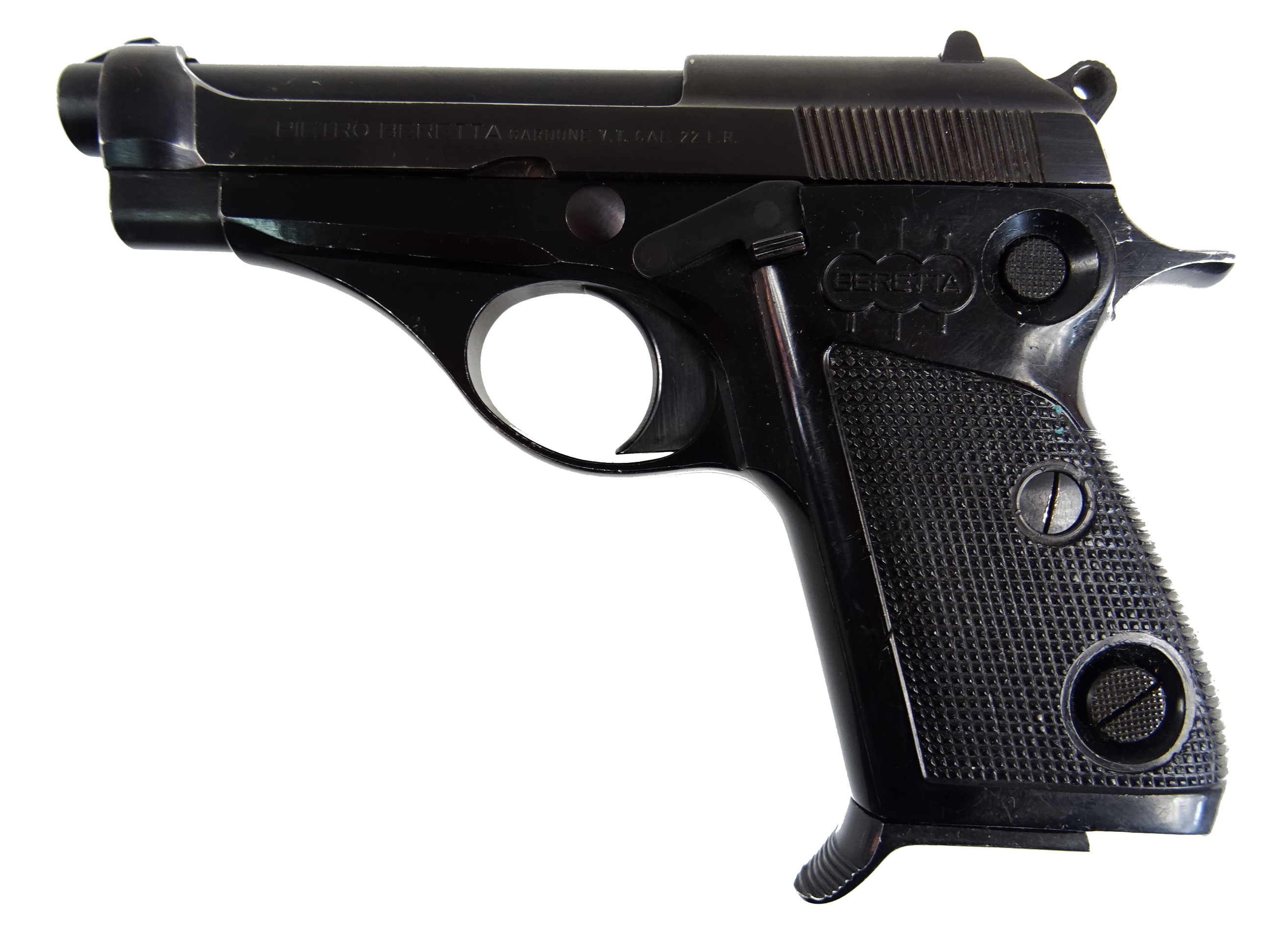
Beretta M71 .22 Long Rifle

The Model 71 was sold in .22LR caliber only, and featured an aluminum alloy frame instead of the steel frame used in the Model 70 and 70s. This change reduced the weight of the pistol by about 200 grams. The 71 (and 72) were also marketed as the "Jaguar".

=== 72 ===
The Model 72 was the same as Models 71 and 75, except it was supplied with two barrels: one short barrel for self-defense, and one long barrel for target shooting. This model was also marketed as Jaguar.

=== 73, 74, 75 ===
Models 73, 74, and 75 were target models with a longer barrel than the others. Model 74 featured adjustable sights mounted on the barrel. Models 73 and 74 are taller, full-sized frames, whereas the 75 retains the compact frame of the other models.

=== 76 ===
Intended as a dedicated target pistol, the Beretta Model 76 featured a large barrel shroud integrated with the frame, similar to the later Beretta 87 Target, and was fitted with a mounting rail for optical sights. Produced from 1971 to 1985, the Model 76 used the same full-size frame as models 73 and 74. Sights are adjustable, but the Model 76 rear sight is mounted to the barrel shroud instead of the back of the barrel as on the 74, giving it a longer sight radius and greater accuracy. The Model 76 was available with either plastic or wooden grips, and sold as the Model 76P or 76W.

=== 100, 101, 102 ===
The 100 series pistols were identical to the 70 series, but were briefly marketed in the United States as such in the late 1960s. The Model 100 was a .32 ACP with the longer, 150mm barrel and the grip frame of the .22 caliber model; apart from its weight of nearly a kilogram, the pistol's remaining attributes are identical to the Model 74. Model 101 was identical to the Model 74, and Model 102 was identical to Model 76. This numbering scheme was dropped in the mid 1970s, when the original Model 70 designation was resumed.

Models of the 70 Series
Model	Caliber	Barrel length	Magazine capacity	Rear sight	Front sight	Weight
70	.32 ACP	90 millimetres (3.5 in)	8	Fixed	Fixed	660 grams (23 oz)
70	.32 ACP	90 millimetres (3.5 in)	8	Fixed	Fixed	520 grams (18 oz)
70 S	.380 ACP	90 millimetres (3.5 in)	7	Fixed	Fixed	675 grams (23.8 oz)
70 S	.32 ACP	90 millimetres (3.5 in)	8	Fixed	Fixed	685 grams (24.2 oz)
70 S	.22 Long Rifle	90 millimetres (3.5 in)	8	Adjustable	Fixed	635 grams (22.4 oz)
71	.22 Long Rifle	90 millimetres (3.5 in)	8	Fixed	Fixed	480 grams (17 oz)
72	.22 Long Rifle	150 millimetres (5.9 in)	8	Fixed	Fixed	535 grams (18.9 oz)
72	.22 Long Rifle	90 millimetres (3.5 in)	8	Fixed	Fixed	535 grams (18.9 oz)
73	.22 Long Rifle	150 millimetres (5.9 in)	10	Fixed	Fixed	550 grams (19 oz)
74	.22 Long Rifle	150 millimetres (5.9 in)	10	Adjustable	Fixed	570 grams (20 oz)
75	.22 Long Rifle	150 millimetres (5.9 in)	8	Fixed	Fixed	525 grams (18.5 oz)
76	.22 Long Rifle	150 millimetres (5.9 in)	10	Adjustable	Replaceable	930 grams (33 oz)
76S	.22 Long Rifle	150 millimetres (5.9 in)	10	Adjustable	Replaceable	≈800 grams (28 oz)
100	.32 ACP	150 millimetres (5.9 in)	9	Adjustable	Fixed	990 grams (35 oz)
101	.22 Long Rifle	150 millimetres (5.9 in)	10	Adjustable	Fixed	-
102	.22 Long Rifle	150 millimetres (5.9 in)	10	Adjustable	Replaceable	-

== Versions ==
No special designation was made for it, but the Model 70 was available with a threaded barrel and detachable suppressor.

=== Base versions (no letter suffix) ===
The Model 70 series, without suffix, was manufactured from 1958–1968. At some point in this period, the frame-mounted thumb safety was adopted, replacing the older cross-bolt safety of the Model 951.

=== S version ===
The S version was introduced in 1977, included a new magazine safety, and marked the adoption of caliber .380 for the Model 70, to replace .32 ACP. The .22 caliber guns had adjustable rear sights, but the .380 did not. Production ceased in 1985.

=== T version ===
The T version was produced from 1969 to 1975, and featured a 9-round magazine (+1 from base models) and lengthened 6" (152mm) target barrel.

== Users ==
- Iraq - Produced under license as Tariq from 1980
- Israel - Sky Marshals, Mossad, Sayeret Matkal, Israeli Police
- Italy - Italian police
- Libya

== Gallery ==
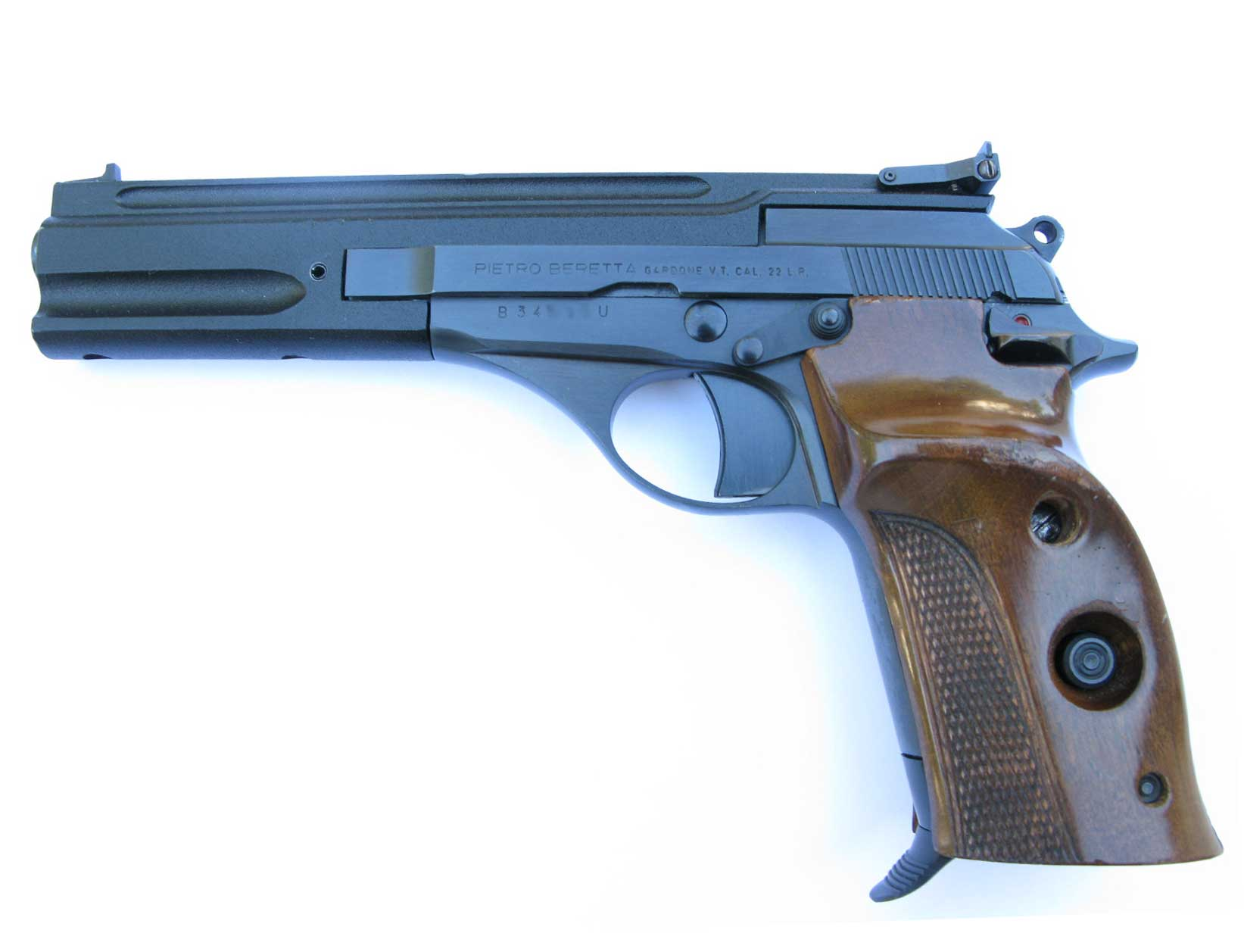
Model 76 with wooden grips

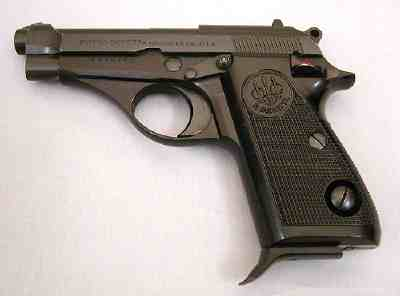
Model 70 with newer thumb-operated manual safety, flat grips, and early model magazine release button

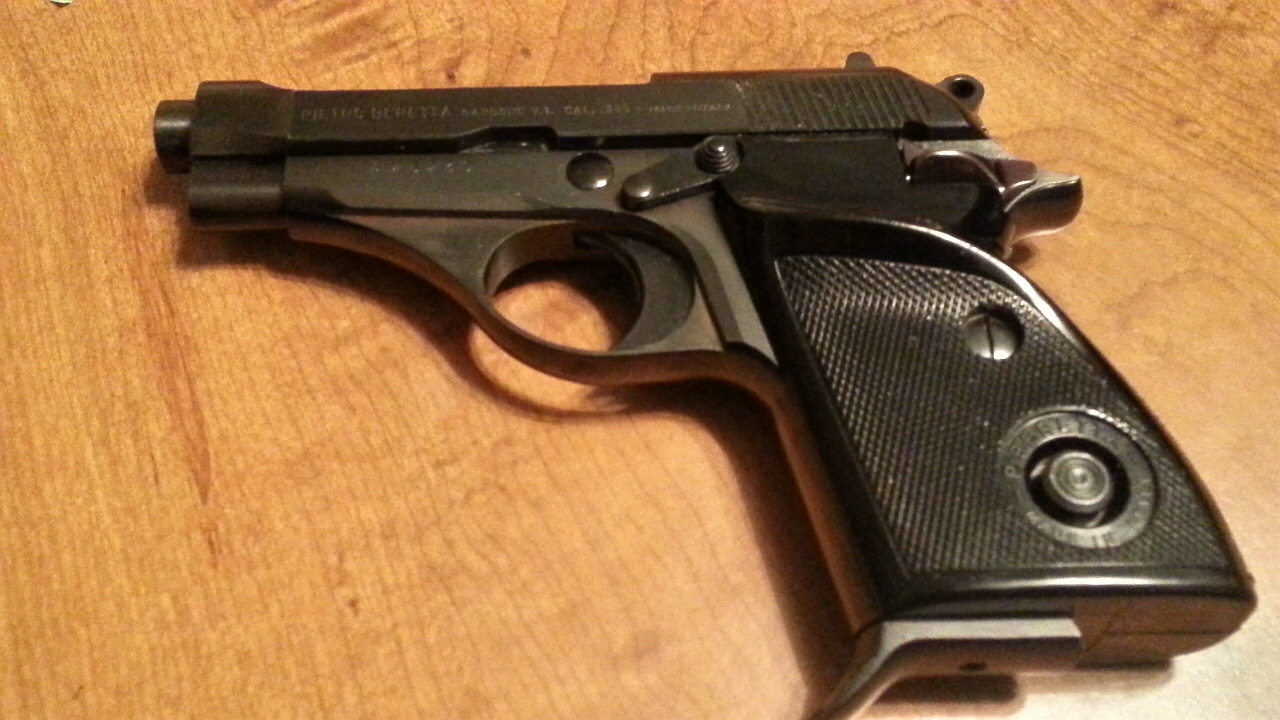
Model 70S with thumb-rest grip and late model magazine release button

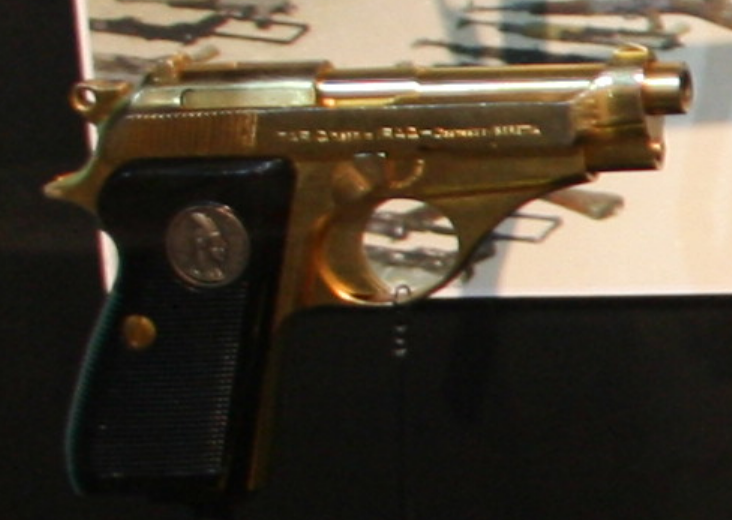
Tariq Pistol.

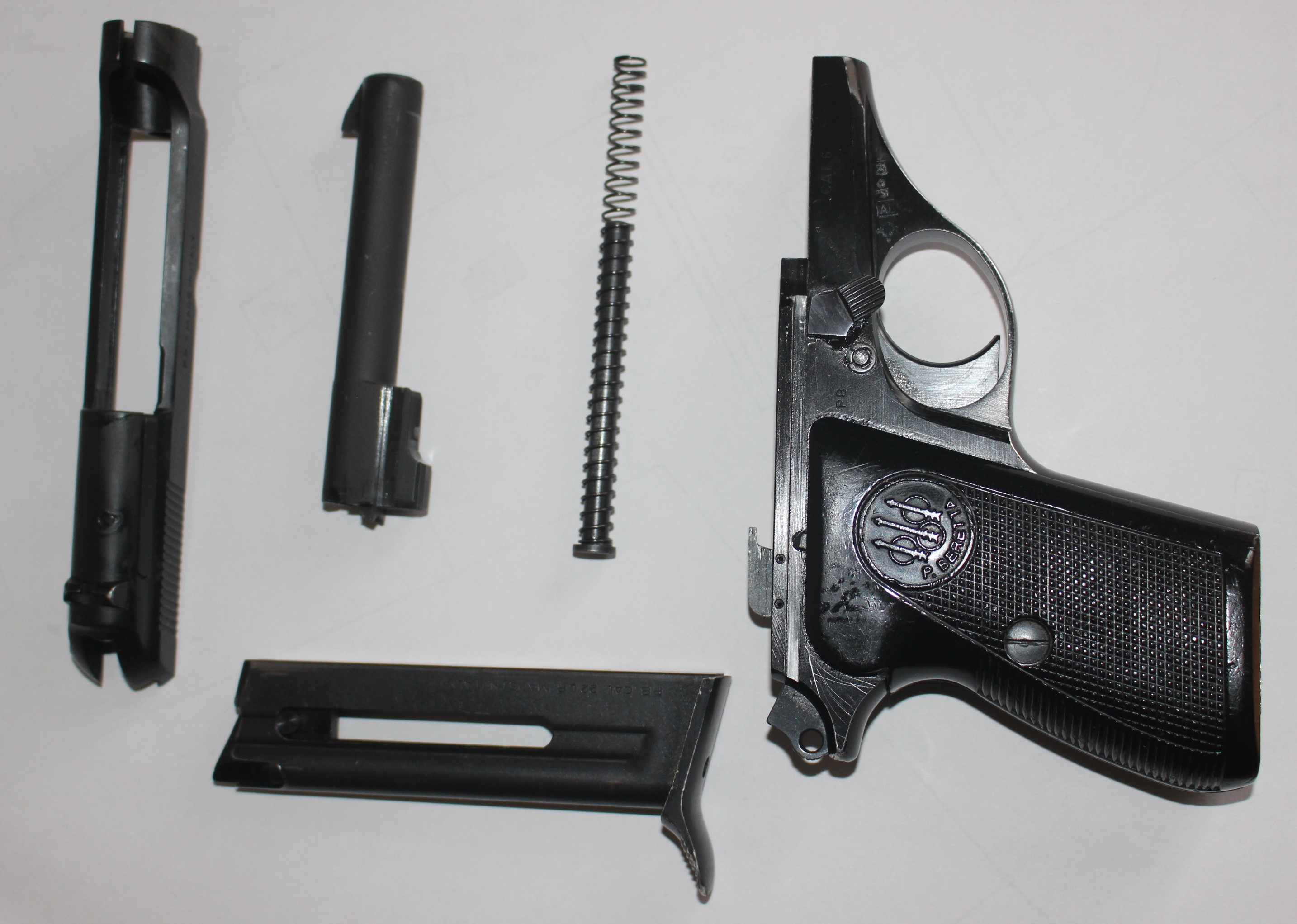
A dissasembled Beretta 71
