= TPG =

TPG may refer to:

== Businesses ==
- TPG (internet service provider), in Australia
- TPG Inc., formerly Texas Pacific Group, an American private equity firm
- TPG Telecom, an Australian telecommunications company
- TNT Post Group, a Dutch mail company, later PostNL
- The Points Guy, an American travel website
- Geneva Public Transport (Transports publics genevois), Swiss public transportation operator

== Other uses ==
- Taiwan Provincial Government
- Third-party grading, independent coin grading and banknote grading authentication
- Taiping Airport, Malaysia, IATA airport code TPG
- Kula language, ISO 639 language code tpg
- The Pains of Growing a 2018 album by Alessia Cara

== See also ==
- TPG-1 (Taktisches Präzisionsgewehr), a German rifle
