= Beretta 90 =

Italian semi-automatic pistol

Beretta Model 90
- Type: Semi-automatic pistol
- Place of origin: Italy

Production history
- Manufacturer: Beretta
- Produced: 1969–1982
- No. built: 22,000

Specifications
- Length: 17.1 cm (6.7 in)
- Barrel length: 9.2 cm (3.6 in)
- Cartridge: 7.65mm Browning (.32 ACP)
- Action: Blowback
- Feed system: 8-round detachable box magazine
- Sights: Fixed front blade and rear notch

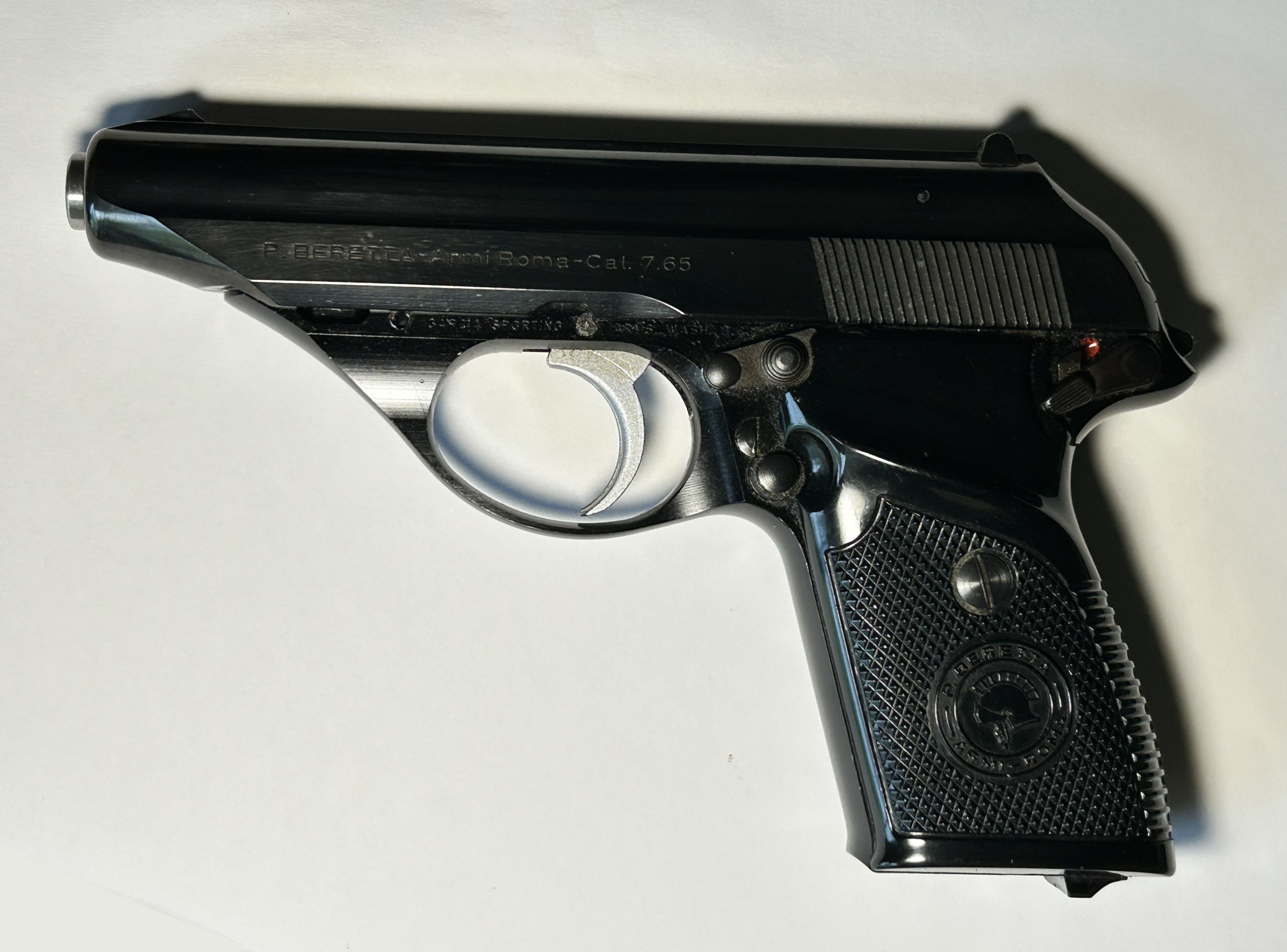
A Beretta 90 pistol, imported by Garcia Sporting Arms

The Beretta Model 90 is a semi-automatic pistol produced by Beretta, primarily from 1969 to 1982. It is a medium-frame pistol, featuring a double-action trigger (a first for Beretta) and a closed-top slide. The Model 90 was designed to compete with other double-action pistols in the European market and was imported into the U.S. market by Garcia Sporting Arms. Despite its innovative design, the pistol was not a commercial success.

Developed by a team led by designer Dino Boglioli and introduced in the fall of 1968, the Model 90 pioneered several features for Beretta, including a stainless steel barrel, an enclosed slide with a right-side ejection port, and a magazine release located behind the trigger guard. The frame was constructed from an aluminum alloy, and the slide was designed to lock open after the last round was fired.

The production of Model 90 was limited, partly due to the caliber (.32 ACP) not being as popular in the US as other options, especially for defensive purposes. It was produced alongside the more popular Model 70, with some modifications to the Model 90 over time, including a hold-open device easily engaged by the right thumb.

Production ran until March 1982, with approximately 22,000 units manufactured at Beretta's factory in Rome.

== Sources ==
- Wilson, Robert L. (10 November 2015). The World of Beretta: An International Legend. Simon and Schuster. ISBN 978-1-5107-0930-0.
