= Beretta Sniper =

Beretta 501 Sniper
- Type: Bolt-action Sniper Rifle
- Place of origin: Italy

Service history
- Used by: Italy

Production history
- Manufacturer: Pietro Beretta S.p.A.
- Produced: 1985 to ?

Specifications
- Mass: 5.55kg (empty without sights or bipod)
- Length: 1165 mm
- Barrel length: 586 mm
- Cartridge: 7.62×51mm NATO
- Action: Bolt-action, modified Mauser
- Rate of fire: Manual, single shot
- Muzzle velocity: 845m/sec
- Feed system: 5 round box magazine

The Beretta 501 Sniper is an Italian-made bolt-action sniper rifle. Introduced in 1985, it was intended for military and police use. The Beretta Sniper was adopted by number of European police forces and by armies in other parts of the world.

Because of competition by more modern sniper rifle designs and due to the lack of interest in the M501 rifle, the product was discontinued. The 501 Sniper has been replaced in service by newer sniper rifle designs.

== Design ==
The 501 is a conventional bolt-action rifle that utilizes a modified Mauser action. The 501 has a heavy, free-floating barrel fitted with a flash suppressor.

The 501 fires 7.62mm NATO rounds, weighs 5.56 kg, is 1165mm in length, has a 586 mm barrel and uses a 5-round detachable box magazine.

The standard stock is made of wood. Within a stock is built a tube that's attached to a receiver. It contains a harmonic balancer, a weight and springs help manage recoil. At the end of the tube can be used to mount a bipod.

The sight mount is a NATO STANAG 2324 and takes any NATO-standard night-vision and optical sight.

== Users ==
- Italy: Italian Army, has been replaced with the Accuracy International Arctic Warfare Magnum rifles.

== See also ==
- Accuracy International PM
- Unique Alpine TPG-1
