= Beretta AL390 =

- Type: Semi-automatic shotgun
- Place of origin: Italy

Production history
- Manufacturer: Beretta

Specifications
- Mass: 7.6 pounds (3.4 kg)
- Length: varies
- Caliber: 12-gauge
- Action: Semi-automatic

The Beretta AL390 is a semi-automatic shotgun first listed in the 1992 Beretta catalogue. The shotgun features a self compensating gas operating system and a 12 gauge barrel.

The field model features anodized light alloy receiver, scroll engraving, a matte black receiver top, and a walnut finish on the stock. The gun is typically used by hunting enthusiasts.

The AL390 came in five extra variants. These include the: Sporting variant, 20 gauge sporting variant, 20 gauge youth edition sporting, and a gold sporting variant.
