= Beretta 1200 FP =

- Type: Semi-automatic shotgun
- Place of origin: Italy

Production history
- Manufacturer: Beretta

Specifications
- Mass: 2.89 kilograms (6.4 lb)
- Length: 50.8 centimetres (20.0 in)
- Caliber: 12-gauge
- Action: Semi-automatic

The Beretta 1200 FP is a semi-automatic shotgun developed in the late 1980s or early 1990s by the Italian arms manufacturing company Fabbrica d'Armi Pietro Beretta. The gun was primarily intended for self defense, law enforcement, and military use.

The gun was fitted with a 6 shot magazine, a 50.8 cm barrel, with a matte black stock and a black metallic finish. Although the gun first appeared in the 1988 catalogue for Beretta, the 1200FP was marketed from around 1984 to the late 1980s with about 28,000 models being built in excess.
