= Bartolomeo Beretta =

Italian Gun maker who established the Firearms manufacturing company Beretta

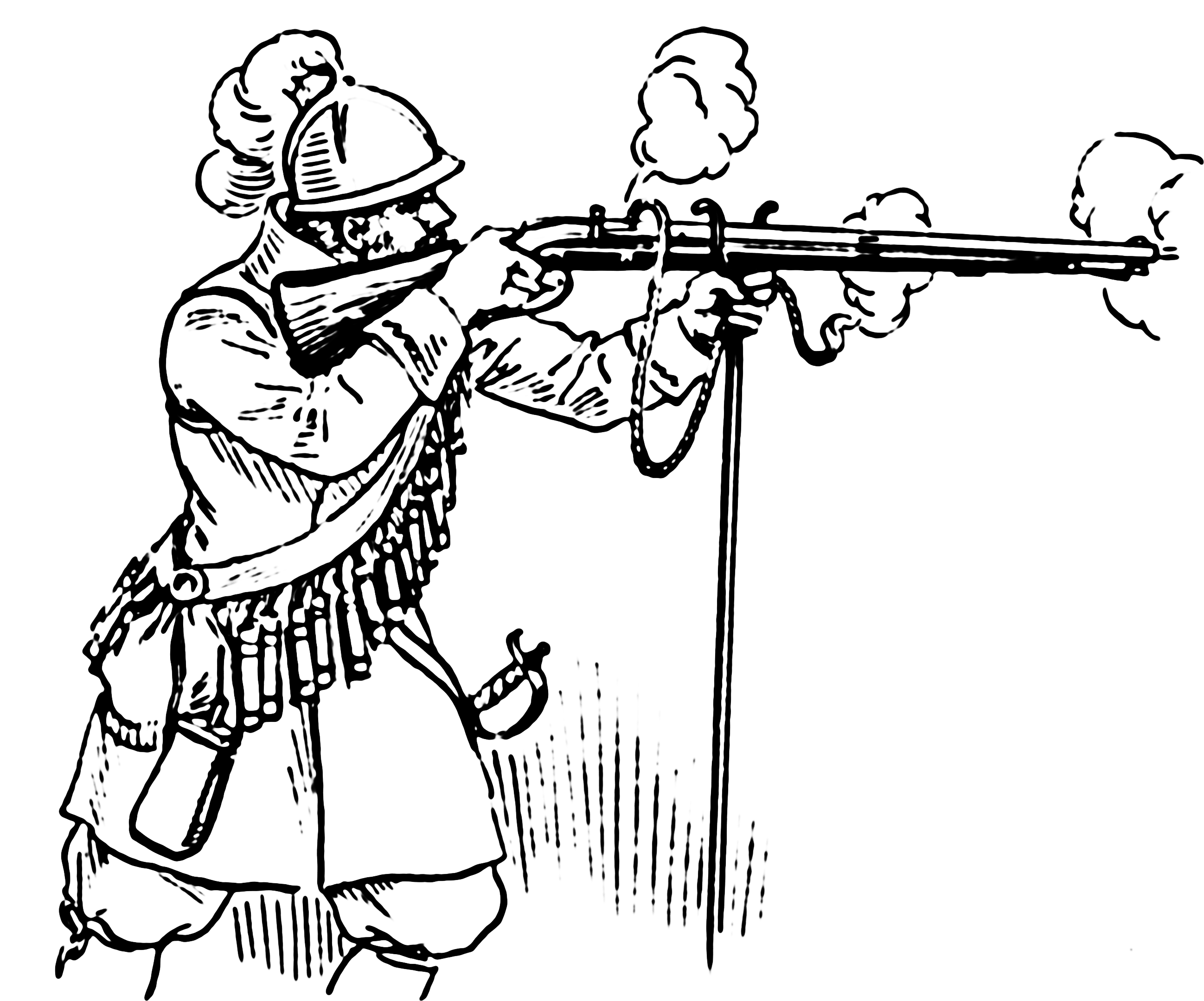
An arquebus

Bartolomeo Beretta (c. 1490 – c. 1565), known as maestro di canne (master gun-barrel maker), was an Italian artisan from Lombardy who, by 1526, had established the arms manufacturing enterprise Beretta.

Beretta worked at Gardone in Val Trompia, then in the Republic of Venice, where he was the village ironmaster. He became known for his attention to detail and was a prolific maker of gun barrels. In 1526, the Venetian Arsenal paid him 296 ducats for 185 arquebus barrels.

The iron foundry and arms business was continued and developed by Beretta's son Jacopo and grandson Giovannino, and the Beretta family remains in control of the business in the 21st century. Encyclopædia Britannica calls Beretta "one of the world's oldest industrial enterprises".
