= Beretta Silver Pigeon =

- Type: Double barreled shotgun
- Place of origin: Italy

Production history
- Manufacturer: Beretta
- Unit cost: $2350 USD (MSRP)
- Produced: 1950s–present

Specifications
- Barrel length: 26, 28, 30 or 32 inches
- Caliber: 12, 20, or 28 gauge or .410 bore

The Beretta Silver Pigeon is a double-barreled shotgun. It is an over and under gun, with one barrel above the other. It is most often used for hunting birds and for clay target games such as trap and skeet. There are several models in field and sporting, for example 683, 686, and 687, with different features and finishes, and in various gauges.

The Silver Pigeon is manufactured, marketed, and distributed by Fabbrica d'Armi Pietro Beretta, in Gardone Val Trompia, Italy.

The Silver Pigeon was also produced for a short period as a pump shotgun, called the Silver Pigeon SL 2.
