= Beretta =

Italian firearms manufacturer

Fabbrica d'Armi Pietro Beretta S.p.A.
- Type: Private (S.p.A.)
- Industry: Weapons
- Founded: c. 1526; 500 years ago
- Founder: Bartolomeo Beretta
- Headquarters: Gardone Val Trompia, Italy
- Products: Firearms and accessories
- Parent: Beretta Holding
- Website: beretta.com

Fabbrica d'Armi Pietro Beretta (Italian pronunciation: [ˈfabbrika ˈdarmi ˈpjɛːtro beˈretta]; 'Pietro Beretta Weapons Factory') is a privately held Italian firearms manufacturing company operating in several countries. Its firearms are used worldwide for civilian, law enforcement, and military purposes. Sporting arms account for three-quarters of sales. Beretta also sells shooting clothes and accessories. Founded no later than 1526, Beretta is the oldest active firearm manufacturer and one of the oldest continuously operating companies in the world. Its inaugural product was the arquebus barrel; by all accounts Beretta-made barrels equipped the Venetian fleet at the Battle of Lepanto in 1571. Beretta has supplied weapons for every major European war since 1650.

== History ==
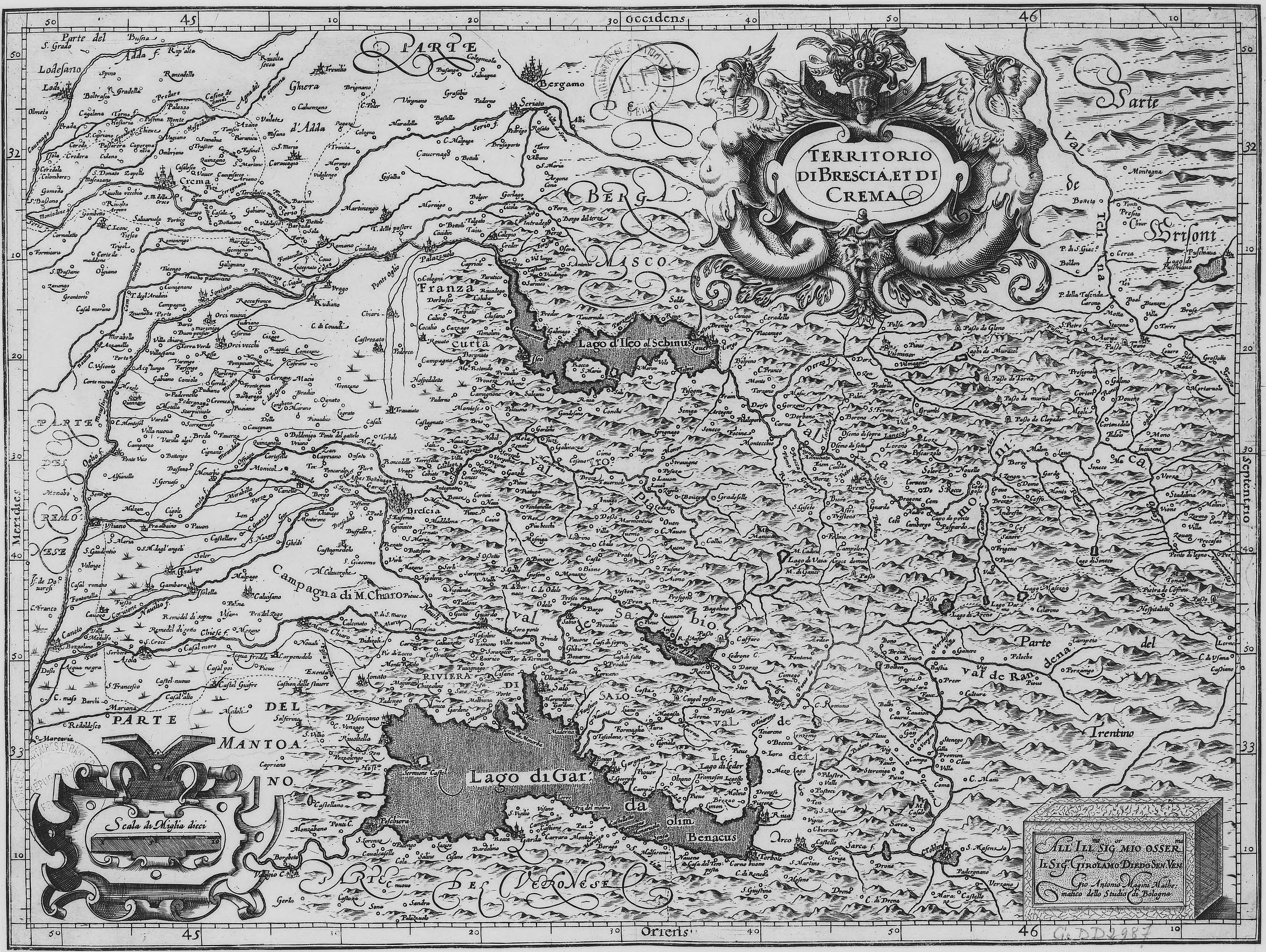
A 16th century map by Giovanni Antonio Magini of the Province of Brescia. Val Trompia is in the center. The map is oriented with the West at the top.

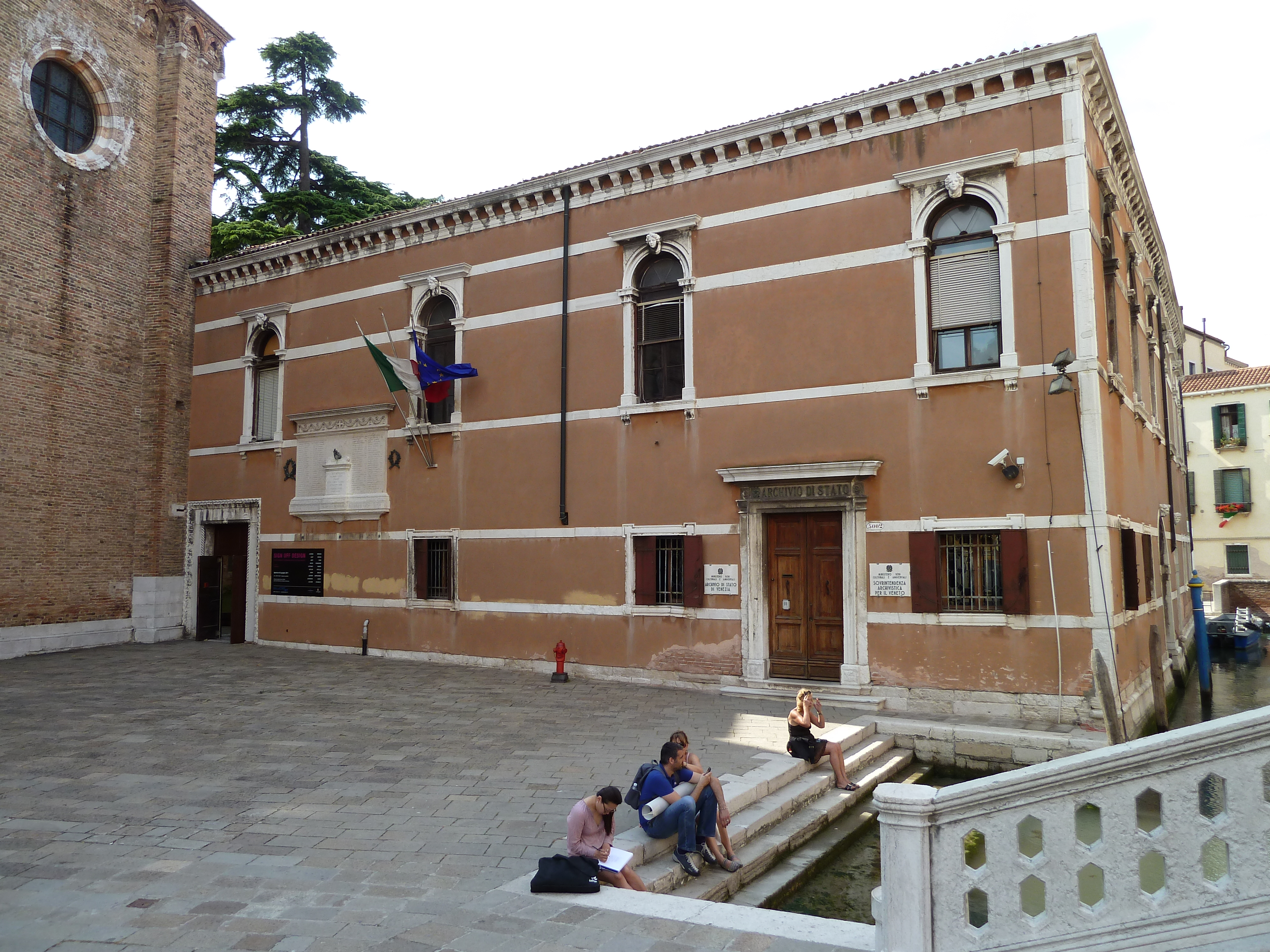
The Venetian State Archive building

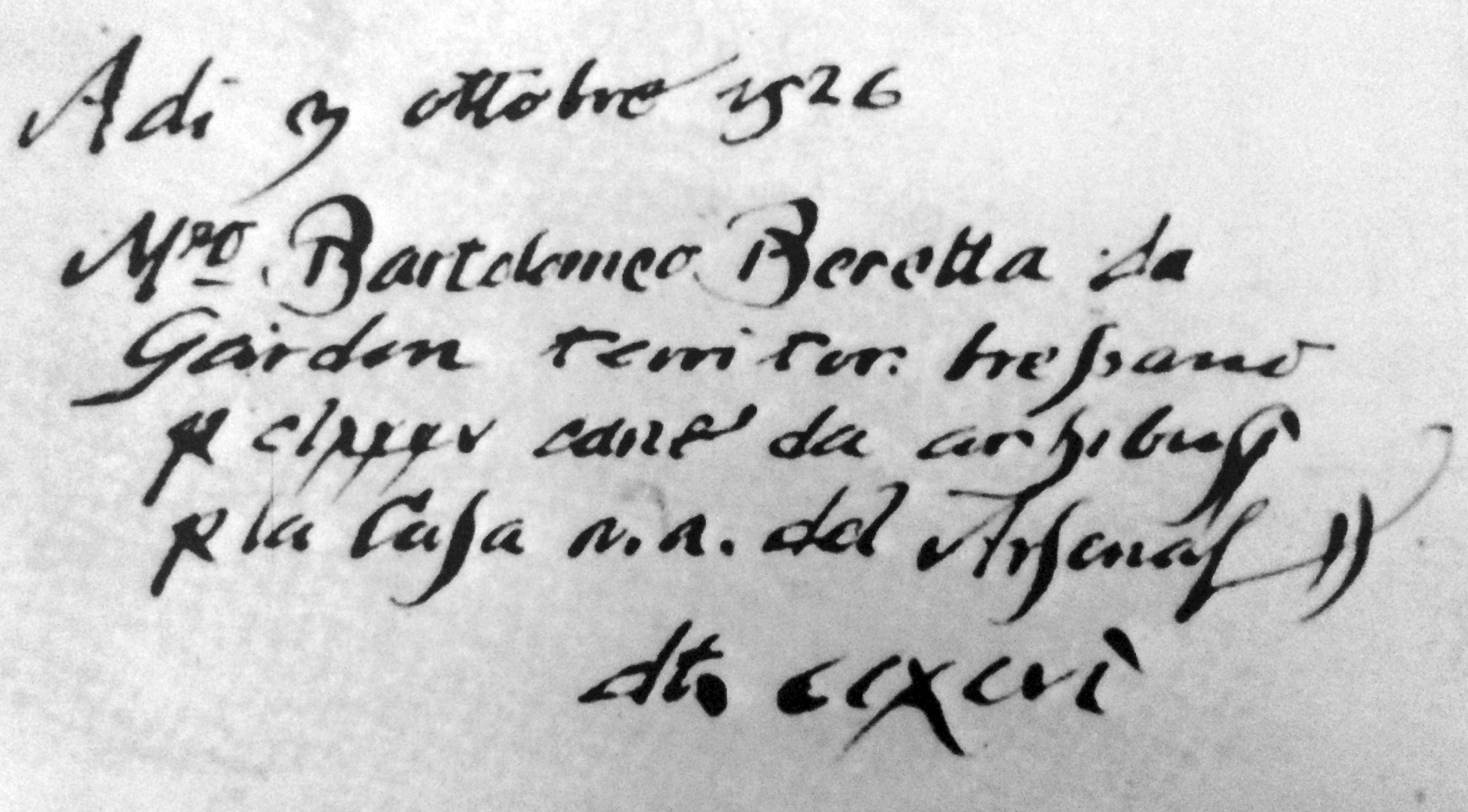
A receipt for the supply of arquebus barrels to the Republic of Venice

Val Trompia, a northern Italian river valley in the Province of Brescia, Lombardy, has been mined for iron ore since the time of the Roman Empire. In the Middle Ages, Val Trompia was known for its ironworks. After the Renaissance, it was a center for the manufacture of weapons. By the mid-16th century, Val Trompia had forty ironworks, supplied by fifty mines and eight smelters. The birthplace of Beretta is in the village of Gardone, located on the banks of the Mella river in the middle of Val Trompia, between the upper and lower valley.

The Beretta forge was in operation from about 1500. The first documented transaction is a contract dated 3 October 1526, for 185 arquebus barrels, for which the Republic of Venice was to pay 296 ducats to Maestro di Canne (master gun-barrel maker) Bartolomeo Beretta. The original account document for the order of those barrels is now stored in the State Archives of Venice. By the end of the 17th century, Beretta was the second largest gun barrel maker in Gardone.

Under the guild system, the knowledge of gun barrel fabrication that had been bequeathed to Jacopo (1520/25 – ...) by his father Bartolomeo (1490 – 1565/68) was passed down to Jacopo's son, Giovannino (1550 – post-1577), and then to his grandson Giovan Antonio (1577 – post-1649). It continued to be passed down in this manner until guilds were abolished by Napoleon, after his conquest of the Venetian Republic in 1797.

The same family has owned Beretta for almost five hundred years. Beretta is a founding member of Les Henokiens, an association of bicentenary companies that are family-owned and operated.

Between 1797 and 1903, the Beretta family slowly developed its industrial capacities, becoming one of the best industries in Val Trompia for commercial hunting rifles and shotguns. Under the guide of Pietro Beretta, taking the reins of the company in 1903, the factory got entirely modernized, with new buildings, new machines and new investments, really pushing the Beretta name to a higher status.

With the start of the First World War, Beretta got entangled in military contracts for the Italian Army. Even before entering the conflict, Beretta proposed several projects to the Chief of Staff, especially concerning automatic pistols, gunsmithing services and a caliber conversion for old Vetterli-Vitali rifles.

In November 1915 the Italian Army adopted and ordered the Pistola Automatica Beretta Mod. 915, starting a long line of practical and simple automatic pistols that still get adopted by military forces to this day. That first model of automatic pistol in 9mm Glisenti was followed by a smaller version, chambered in .32 ACP and known as Mod. 15/17. By 1918, Beretta was producing pistols and parts for machine guns, especially for the Pistola Mitragliatrice Villar Perosa mod. 1915, one of the first submachine guns in the world.

The army asked Beretta and other gun firms to develop an automatic carbine, using Villar Perosa's parts: Beretta won the trials with its Moschetto Automatico Revelli-Beretta Mod. 1915 (often incorrectly called MAB 1918).

During the Interwar years Beretta kept collaborating with the Italian Military, accepting a Navy contract to convert rifles to TS carbine configuration in 1929, producing brand new carbines and rifles for the Army, and taking part in the production of Type I Rifles "for the Manchukuo military", via Japanese request. The last shipment of Type I left the port of Genoa on the Suwa Maru ship in november 1939.

Beretta manufactured rifles and pistols for the Italian military until the 1943 Armistice between Italy and the Allied forces during World War II.

Once the Wehrmacht took control of northern Italy, the Germans seized Beretta and continued using it to produce arms until the 1945 German surrender in Italy. During that time, the quality of the exterior finish of the weapons diminished. Late-war specimens were much inferior to both the pre-war and mid-war weapons but remained effective.

After World War II, Beretta repaired the American M1 Garands that the U.S. had given Italy. Beretta modified the M1 into the Beretta BM-59 rifle, which is similar to the M14 battle rifle. Armourers consider the BM-59 rifle to be superior to the M14 rifle in some ways because it is more accurate under certain conditions.

After the war, Beretta continued to develop firearms for the Italian army and police force, as well as the civilian market.

In the 1970s, Beretta started a manufacturing plant in São Paulo, Brazil. A contract between Beretta and the Brazilian government was signed, under which Beretta produced Beretta 92s for the Brazilian army until 1980. Later this plant was sold to Taurus, who continues to manufacture the Beretta 92 under the name of PT92 using the same tools and labour that Beretta used, without the need for a license from Beretta, since the design is based on the original Beretta 92, for which the patents have expired.

In the late 1980s, Beretta acquired several domestic competitors, notably Benelli and Franchi, and some foreign companies, notably in Finland.

Also in the 1980s, Beretta enjoyed a renewal of popularity in North America after its Beretta 92 pistol was selected as the service handgun for the United States Army, as the "M9 pistol". In 1993, a Beretta USA executive revealed that it had been the company's strategy since 1980 "to use the military contract to make Beretta a household name in the United States", and then to expand into more prominent law enforcement and commercial markets.

== Overview ==
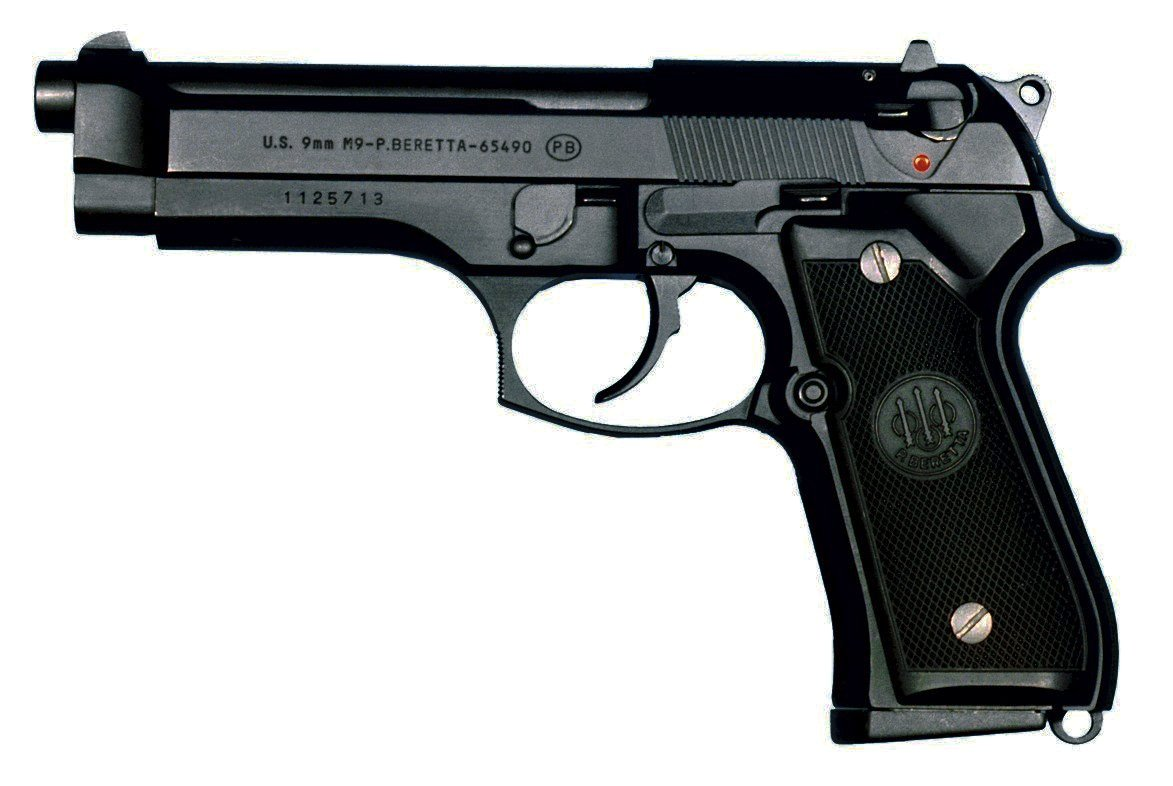
A Beretta M9

Since 2015, the president and CEO of Fabbrica d'Armi Pietro Beretta (Beretta S.p.A.) has been Franco Gussalli Beretta.

The traditional father-to-son Beretta dynasty was interrupted when Ugo Gussalli Beretta assumed control. Uncles Carlo and Giuseppe Beretta were childless. Ugo married into the Beretta family and adopted the last name Beretta. His sons are now direct descendants through their mother's side of the family.

Beretta is known for its broad range of firearms: side-by-side shotguns, over-and-under shotguns, semi-automatic shotguns, hunting rifles, express rifles, assault rifles, submachine guns, lever- and bolt-action rifles, single- and double-action revolvers and semi-automatic pistols. The parent company, Beretta Holding, owns Beretta USA, Benelli, Franchi, SAKO, Stoeger, Tikka, Uberti, the Burris Optics company, and SwissP Defence.

The model Beretta 92FS was the primary side arm of the United States Army, Marine Corps, Navy and Air Force, designated the M9 pistol. In 1985, Beretta was chosen after a controversial competition to produce the M9, winning a contract for 500,000 pistols. A condition of the original agreement was domestic manufacture of the M9. In 2017, the 9mm version of the SIG Sauer P320 was selected to replace the M9 throughout the U.S. Armed Forces.

== Product lines ==
=== Semi-automatic pistols ===
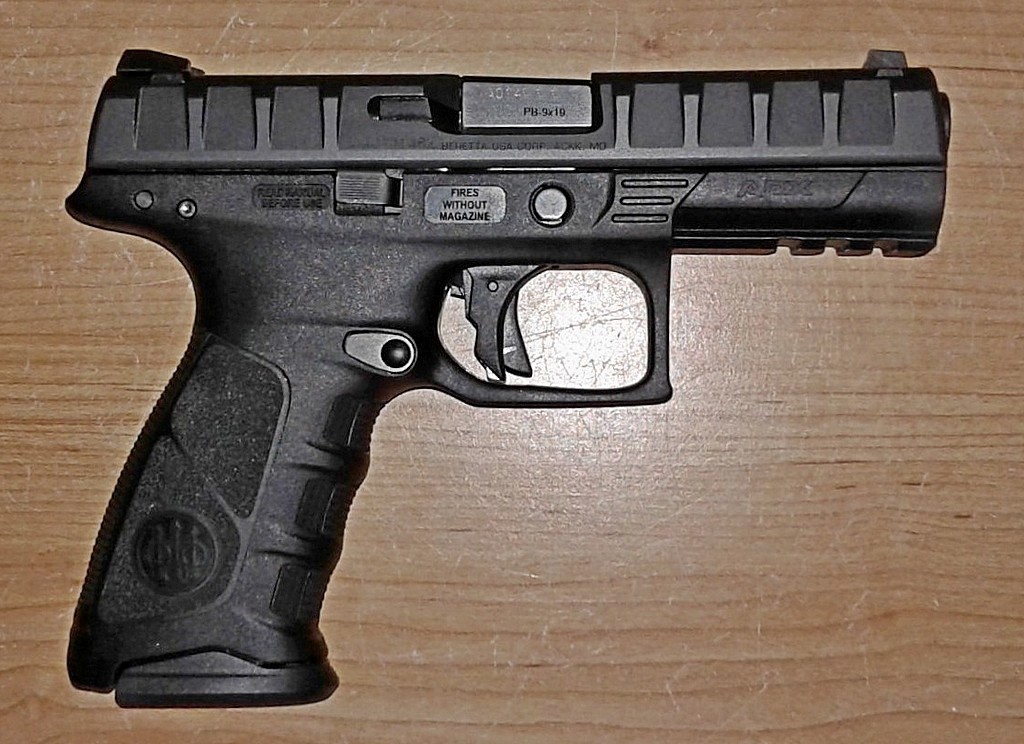
A Beretta APX

- Beretta Model 1915
- Beretta M1923
- Beretta 418
- Beretta M1934 / Beretta M1935
- Beretta M1951
- Beretta 70 series
  - Beretta 70
  - Beretta 71 Jaguar
  - Beretta 72 Jaguar
  - Beretta 73, 74, 75
  - Beretta 76
  - Beretta 100, 101, 102
- Beretta Cheetah
  - Beretta 80X
  - Beretta 81
  - Beretta 84
  - Beretta 85
  - Beretta 86
  - Beretta 87
  - Beretta 89
- Beretta 8000
  - Beretta 8000 Cougar
  - Beretta 8045 Cougar
  - Beretta Cougar Inox
  - Beretta Mini Cougar
- Beretta 90
- Beretta 9000
  - Beretta 9000S

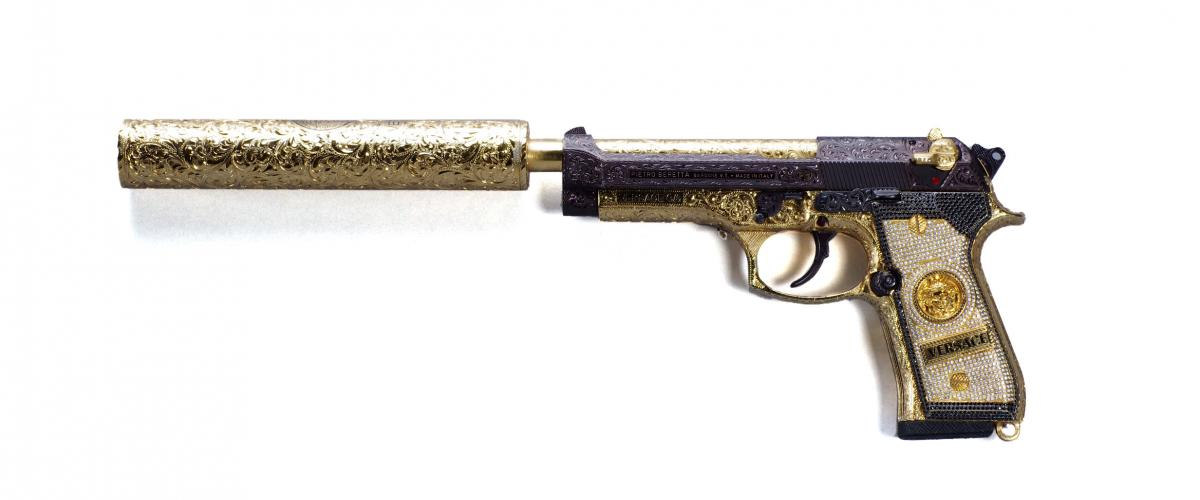
Joaquín "El Chapo" Archivaldo Guzmán Loera's Beretta 92F 9MM Parabellum Pistol

- Beretta 92
  - Beretta 90two
  - Beretta 92F
  - Beretta 92F/FS
  - Beretta 92FS Inox
    - Beretta 92FS Compact
    - Beretta 92FS Centurion
    - Beretta 92FS Brigadier
    - Beretta 92FS Brigadier Inox
  - Beretta 92G Elite 1A
    - Beretta 92G Elite II
  - Beretta 92S
    - Beretta 92SB
      - Beretta 92SB-C
  - Beretta 92A1
  - M9 pistol
  - Beretta 92X
- Beretta 96
  - Beretta 96A1
- Beretta Px4 Storm
  - Beretta Px4 Storm Compact
  - Beretta Px4 Storm Subcompact
- Beretta U22 Neos
- Beretta APX
- Beretta 20
- Beretta 21 Bobcat
  - Beretta 21A Bobcat
- Beretta 3032 Tomcat
- Beretta 948 22lr
- Beretta 950 Jetfire
- Beretta Nano
- Beretta Pico

=== Revolvers ===
- Beretta Model 1
- Beretta Stampede
- Beretta Laramie
- Manurhin MR73

=== Shotguns ===
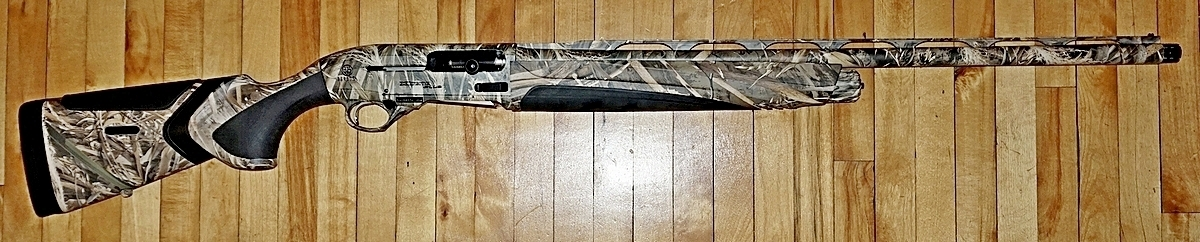
A Beretta A400 Xtreme Plus 12ga

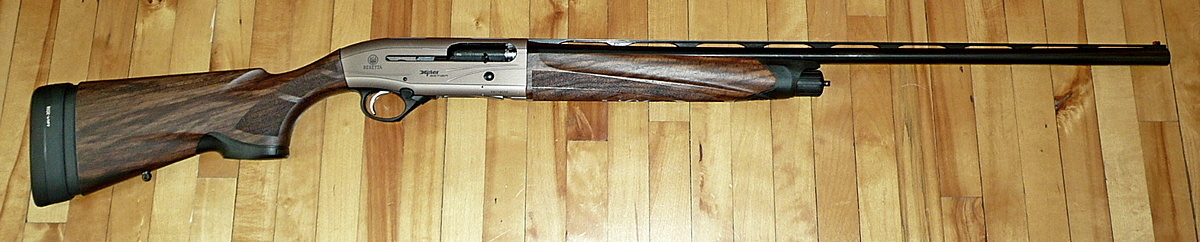
A Beretta A400 Xplor Action 20ga

- Beretta 470 Silver Hawk
- Beretta 682
- Beretta 686
- Beretta 688
- Beretta 692
- Beretta 1200
- Beretta 1200 FP
- Beretta 1201
- Beretta 1201FP
- Beretta 1301
  - Beretta 1301 Comp
  - Beretta 1301 Tactical
- Beretta AL390
- Beretta AL391 Urika and Teknys
- Beretta A400
  - Beretta A400 Xcel
  - Beretta A400 Xtreme Unico, Plus, Xplor
- Beretta A300 Outlander
- Beretta A350 Outlander
- Beretta ASE 90
- Beretta ASE Gold
- Beretta Bellmonte II
- Beretta DT-10
- Beretta DT-11
- Beretta LTLX7000
- Beretta RS 202-M2
- Beretta Silver Pigeon
- Beretta SL2
- Beretta SL3
- Beretta SO1, SO2, SO3, SO4, SO5, SO6, SO9, SO10
- Beretta SV10 Perennia
- Beretta Tx4
  - Beretta Tx4 Storm
- Beretta UGB25 Xcel
- Beretta Xtrema
- Beretta Xtrema 2
- Beretta Model A series
- Beretta Folder
- Beretta Ultraleggero

=== Rifles and carbines ===
- Beretta BM59
- Beretta Rx4 Storm
- Beretta Cx4 Storm
- Beretta BRX1 straight-pull bolt-action rifle

=== Assault rifles ===
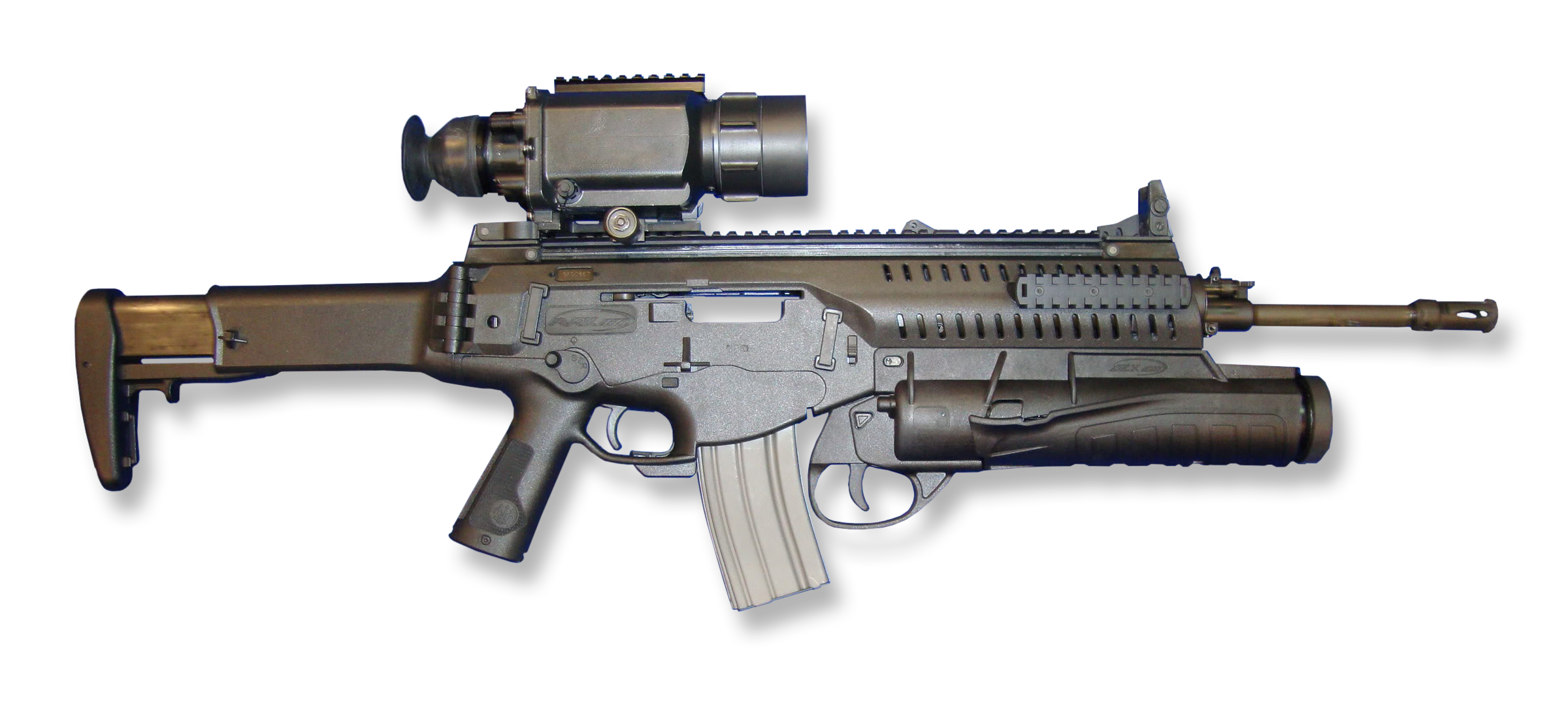
A Beretta ARX 160 with thermal sight and grenade launcher

- Beretta AR70/90
- Beretta AS70/90
- Beretta AR-70/223
- Beretta ARX 160
- Beretta ARX 200
- Beretta NARP

=== Sniper rifles ===
- Beretta 501
- Beretta Victrix Corvus

=== Submachine guns ===
- Beretta Model 1
- Beretta Model 1918
- Beretta Model 38
  - Beretta Model 38A
  - Beretta Model 38/42
  - Beretta Model 38/44
- Beretta Model 3 – a postwar modification of the 38/42
- Beretta M12 series
- Beretta PMX
- Beretta Mx4 Storm

=== Machine pistols ===
- Beretta M951R
- Beretta 93R
- Model 951A

=== Grenade launchers ===
- Beretta GLX-160 (underbarrel grenade launcher for the Beretta ARX160)

== See also ==
- Beretta Holding
- List of modern armament manufacturers
- List of oldest companies
