= Beretta U22 Neos =

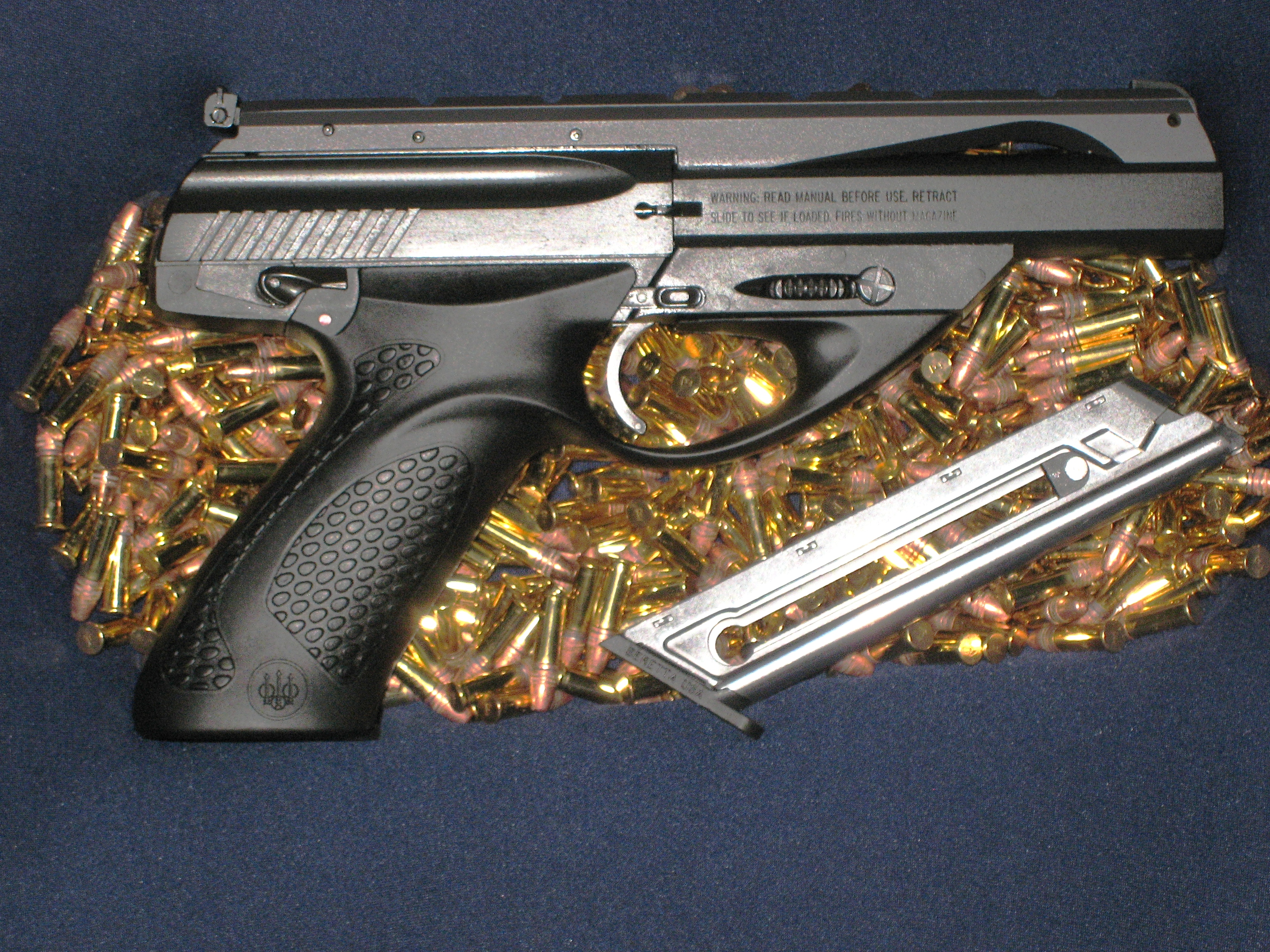
- Beretta U22 Neos basic model; black with 4.5″ barrel.
- Type: Pistol
- Place of origin: United States; Italy

Production history
- Designer: Giorgetto Giugiaro (styling); Beretta USA (engineering)
- Manufacturer: Beretta USA Accokeek, Maryland
- Produced: 2002–present 2003–2007 DLX models

Specifications
- Mass: 4.5″ bbl: 900 g (31.7 oz) unloaded 6.0″: 1,025 g (36.2 oz) unloaded 7.5″: 1,114 g (39.3 oz) unloaded
- Length: 4.5″ bbl: 224 millimetres (8.8 in); 6.0″ bbl: 262 mm (10.3 in); 7.5″ bbl: 300 mm (11.8 in)
- Barrel length: 114 mm (4.5 in); 153 mm (6.0 in); 191 mm (7.5 in)
- Width: 370 mm (15 in)
- Height: 132 mm (5.2 in)
- Cartridge: .22 LR (5.6×15mmR)
- Action: Simple blowback single-action semi-automatic
- Feed system: 10-round box magazine
- Sights: Iron sights, Weaver rail mount

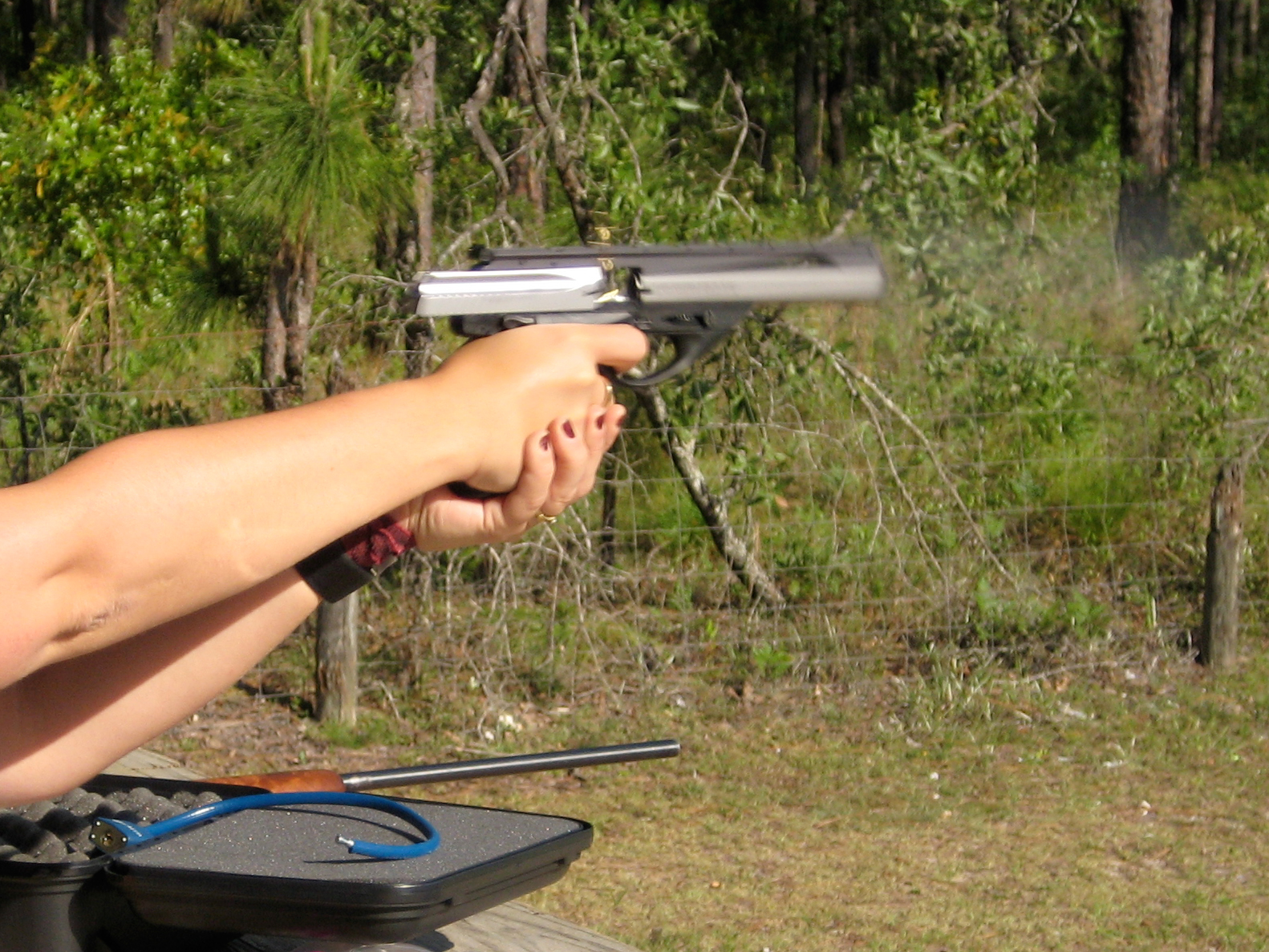
Firing the U22 Neos 6.0 Inox

The Beretta U22 Neos is a .22 Long Rifle semi-automatic, single-action pistol using a slide blow-back system, that has been manufactured in the United States since 2002 by Beretta USA. The pistol will accept interchangeable 4.5, 6 or 7.5 in (110, 150 or 190 mm) barrels in blued or stainless steel finishes. Each barrel incorporates a built-in Weaver-style rail to accommodate optics or accessories. Beretta markets the Neos as a modern, reasonably priced pistol suitable for a beginner, yet is customizable to suit the experienced marksman.

In addition to the United States and Canada, the U22 Neos is listed for sale by Beretta distributors in Australia, France and some other European countries.

== History ==
The U22 Neos was launched in 2002 with a cover story in American Rifleman magazine. A deluxe model, the U22 Neos DLX with both cosmetic and performance improvements was added in 2003. Beretta released the U22 Neos Carbine Kit (to convert the pistol into a long gun) in 2004. The last year of production for the DLX model was 2007.

In September 2010 Beretta instituted a recall of some U22 Neos models because of the remote possibility that the pistol could fire with the safety on. California certification for sale for all Neos models expired in March, 2011, therefore gun dealers may no longer sell them in California. Beretta USA announced in July, 2014 that firearms production in Accokeek, Maryland (where the Neos is manufactured) would be moved to Gallatin, Tennessee.

== Design ==
The U22 Neos is a semi-automatic firearm using simple blowback operation. The pistol does not have a full-length slide (i.e., the barrel is uncovered) and it functions by cycling the rear portion of the action. The breech does not lock upon closing, but is held closed by a recoil spring. When the last cartridge case is ejected the slide is held open by a slide stop. This configuration is similar to the Colt Woodsman and its successors.

The U22 Neos is designed for field stripping without tools into basic modules (barrel with sight rail, receiver, slide and firing pin) for cleaning. The Weaver-style rail incorporates a fully adjustable rear sight and a removable front sight. The grip and trigger guard assembly, made from fiberglass-reinforced "technopolymer", is attached to the receiver with a single bolt and can easily be removed and replaced with an accessory grip. Unusual for a pistol (but unremarkable in a rifle) the magazine release is above the trigger guard and is operated by a right-handed shooter's trigger finger. The magazine holds ten rounds, giving the Neos a total 10+1 capacity.

The origin of the pistol's sleek shape and ergonomics was a collaboration between Beretta engineers and Giugiaro Design stylists. Anticipated buyers for the U22 pistol were a new generation of Beretta enthusiasts, hence the moniker Neos (Greek for new). Blued steel models are sold with a barrel either 4.5 or 6 inches long; the Inox models differ only in that the barrel and slide are made from stainless steel.

=== Safety features ===
The U22 Neos has an ambidextrous manual safety lever mounted on the frame. There is no discrete loaded chamber indicator, but the slide can be opened slightly to check if there is a round in the chamber. The end of the firing pin is clearly visible at the rear of the receiver when cocked, indicating that the pistol is ready to fire (if the manual safety is off). There is no magazine disconnect to prevent the pistol from firing if there is a round in the chamber when the magazine is removed, and for that reason the Neos accommodates single-shot operation with direct chamber loading.

=== Deluxe model ===
In 2003 new features were added to the U22 Neos product line, in the form of DLX models which can be identified by a special U22 NEOS logo is engraved on the slide. As with the standard models, the U22 Neos DLX was made with blue or stainless steel finish. DLX barrel length was 6 inches (150 mm) or 7.5 inches (190 mm) (no 4.5 in (110 mm) DLX model). DLX triggers are adjustable for pre- and overtravel. Front and rear sights have user-replaceable blades in different colors. DLX models have rubber inlays in the pistol grip; these inlays are textured to improve the shooter's grip and are colored for a distinctive appearance.

Following the discontinuation of DLX models in 2007, Beretta has occasionally produced standard Neos pistols with colored grip inlays as dealer exclusive models.

=== Carbine conversion kit ===
Expanding on the modularity of the U22 Neos pistol, in 2004 Beretta introduced a U22 Neos Carbine Kit that transforms the pistol into a light rifle. The kit includes a skeletonized butt stock that takes the place of the grip on the pistol and a separate fore-end assembly that replaces the pistol barrel. A fiber-optic front sight is mounted on the barrel and the integral Weaver-style rail includes an aperture rear sight. This Neos carbine configuration appears quite similar to the Buck Mark Sporter Rifle, but Browning Buck Mark pistols and rifles are purpose-built and major components cannot be interchanged.

== Recall ==
On 15 September 2010, Beretta announced a recall of the U22 Neos because some pistols may fire even if the safety is on, or when the safety is moved to the on position. This recall only applies to some earlier Neos models, and Beretta has posted instructions on determining if a pistol needs service on their Neos support page. Beretta's Accokeek factory performs this service at no cost to the customer. The firing pin and other components are replaced and tested.
