= Beretta Ultraleggero =

- Type: Over-under shotgun
- Place of origin: Italy

Production history
- Designed: 2021
- Manufacturer: Beretta

Specifications
- Mass: 6.2 lb (2.8 kg)
- Barrel length: 20 in (510 mm)
- Barrels: 2

The Beretta Ultraleggero (lit. 'Ultra Light') is an over-under shotgun designed by Beretta in 2021. The Ultraleggero was designed as a replacement for the Beretta Ultralight.

== Design ==
The Ultraleggero was designed in 2021 as a replacement for the discontinued Beretta Ultralight. Unlike the Ultralight, which was made from aluminium, the Ultraleggero is made from pre-hardened steel, which was made lighter by milling the sides and the bottom of the action. The receiver and action are derived from the Beretta 690, while also incorporating aspects of the Beretta 694, but its trigger group is made from aluminium, making it 404 grams lighter.
