= Beretta 90two =

Beretta 90-Two
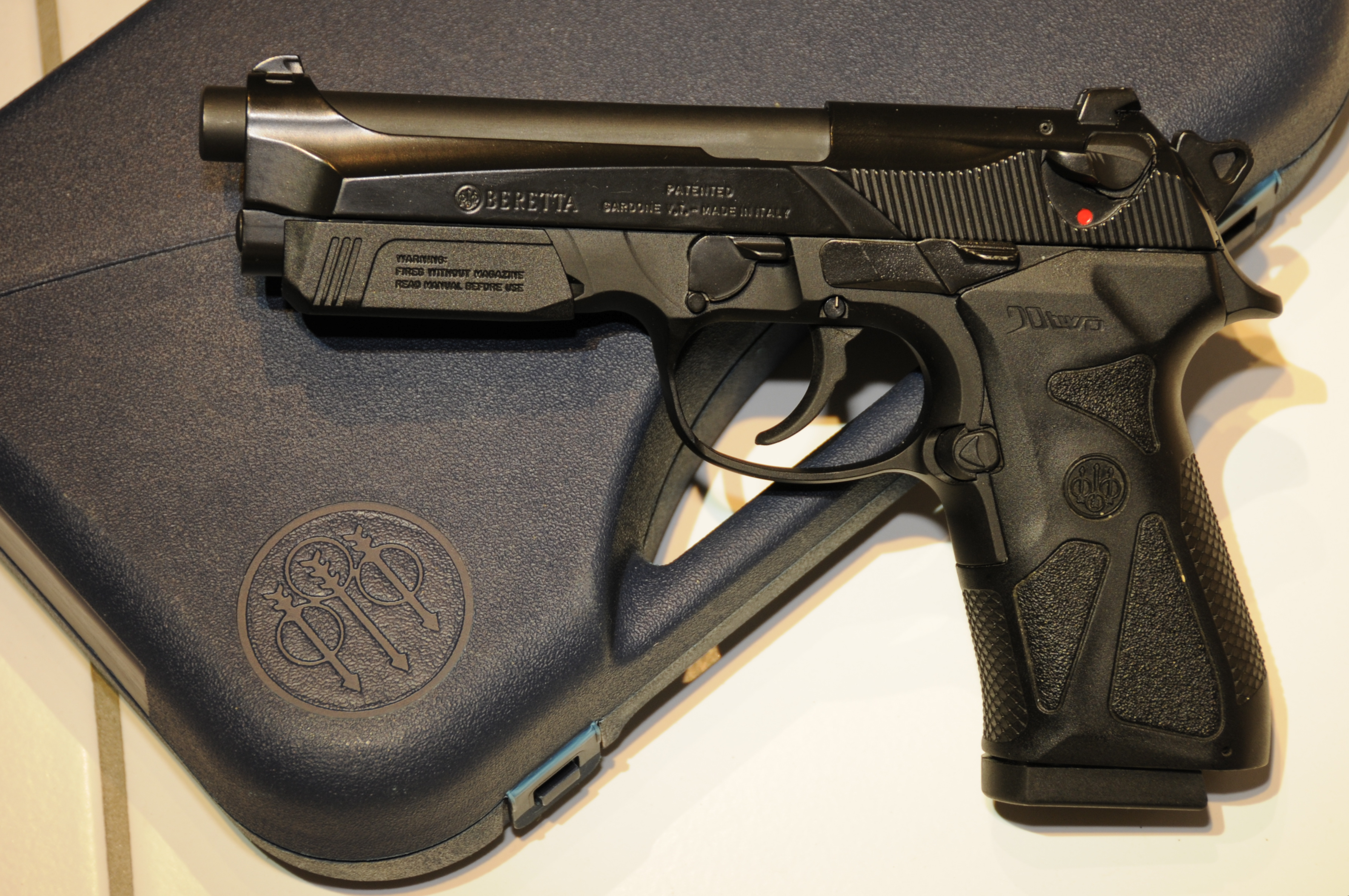
- 9mm Beretta 90-Two with accessory rail cover attached
- Type: Semi-automatic pistol
- Place of origin: Italy

Production history
- Manufacturer: Beretta
- Unit cost: $700
- Produced: 2006–2012
- Variants: See Variants

Specifications
- Mass: 921 g (32.5 oz) (unloaded)
- Length: 217 mm (8.5 in)
- Barrel length: 125 mm (4.9 in)
- Width: 38 mm (1.5 in)
- Height: 140 mm (5.5 in)
- Cartridge: 9×19mm Parabellum; 9×21mm IMI; .40 S&W
- Action: Short recoil of barrel, semi-automatic, locked-breech
- Muzzle velocity: 381 m/s (1,250 ft/s)
- Effective firing range: 50 m (164 ft) 9×19mm Parabellum; 25 m (82 ft) (.40 S&W)
- Feed system: Detachable box magazine: 10, 15, 17 rounds (9×19mm Parabellum); 15, 9×21mm IMI; 10, 12 rounds (.40 S&W)
- Sights: Tritium-illuminated handgun night sights

The Beretta 90-Two is a series of semi-automatic pistols designed and manufactured by Beretta of Italy. It was released in 2006 as an enhanced version of the Beretta 92, and is produced in 9×19mm, 9×21mm IMI and .40 S&W versions.

The 90-Two has been replaced by the 92A1/96A1 in Beretta's lineup (see the Beretta 92 article).

== Overview ==
The most obvious difference between the 92 series and 90-Two series pistols is the appearance; the 90-Two series have an "ergonomically enhanced" design, with a "technopolymer" interchangeable wrap-around style grip allowing users to choose grips that work better with either large or small hands. Also notable is an accessory rail on the dust cover of the pistol, allowing various light/laser accessories to be attached. Similar to the 92 series, the frame is constructed of a light aluminum alloy, and the slide and barrel are constructed of steel.

The slide is also in itself a whole new design. The rough edges in the previous 92 models were smoothed out, for a more "snag-free" design. Included with the pistol is an accessory rail cover, which protects the rail when an accessory is not attached.

Magazine capacities available for the 90-Two 9×19mm are: 10-round single-stack, 15 or 17-round double-stack; the 90-Two 9×21mm IMI: 15 round double-stack, the 90-Two .40 S&W: 10 or 12 round double-stack.

The 90-Two also features an internal recoil buffer and upgraded sight points, with a 5 mm increased length between them.

== Specifications ==
- Caliber: 9×19mm, 9×21mm IMI, .40 S&W
- Magazine capacity: 17 rounds (9×19mm), 15 rounds (9×21mm IMI), 10 or 12 rounds (.40 S&W)
- Length: 8.5 in (215.9 mm)
- Height: 5.5 in (139.7 mm)
- Width: 1.5 in (38.1 mm)
- Barrel length: 4.94 in (125.5 mm)
- Weight unloaded: 32.5 oz (921.4 g)

== Variants ==
=== Calibers ===
The 90-Two series of pistols comes in 9mm, 9×21mm IMI, and .40 S&W versions. The model name and number do not denote caliber.

=== Operation ===
Type F is a double/single-action (DA/SA) pistol with a manual safety that also serves as a hammer decocking lever. It operates in the same way as the Beretta 92F (M9) service pistol. Pushing the slide mounted safety lever down returns the hammer to its "down" position and also disconnects the trigger so that the pistol cannot be fired until the safety lever is pushed up into the "fire" position. There is also a half-cock safety notch.

Type G is a DA/SA pistol similar to the Type F, but there is no manual safety feature. The "safety" lever serves only as a hammer decocker. This action is similar to that of most SIG pistols.

Type D is a double-action-only (DAO) pistol. The hammer follows the slide to the uncocked position with every shot, requiring a double-action trigger pull for each shot. There is no manual safety, half-cock hammer notch, or hammer drop lever. The Type D is a self-loading pistol that operates like a "hammerless" double-action revolver. The Type D has an exposed hammer but it cannot be manually cocked.

== Beretta 92A1 ==
Announced at the 2010 SHOT Show, the Beretta 92A1 incorporates the internal design and Picatinny rail of the 90-Two with the overall shape and styling of the 92FS.

== Gallery ==
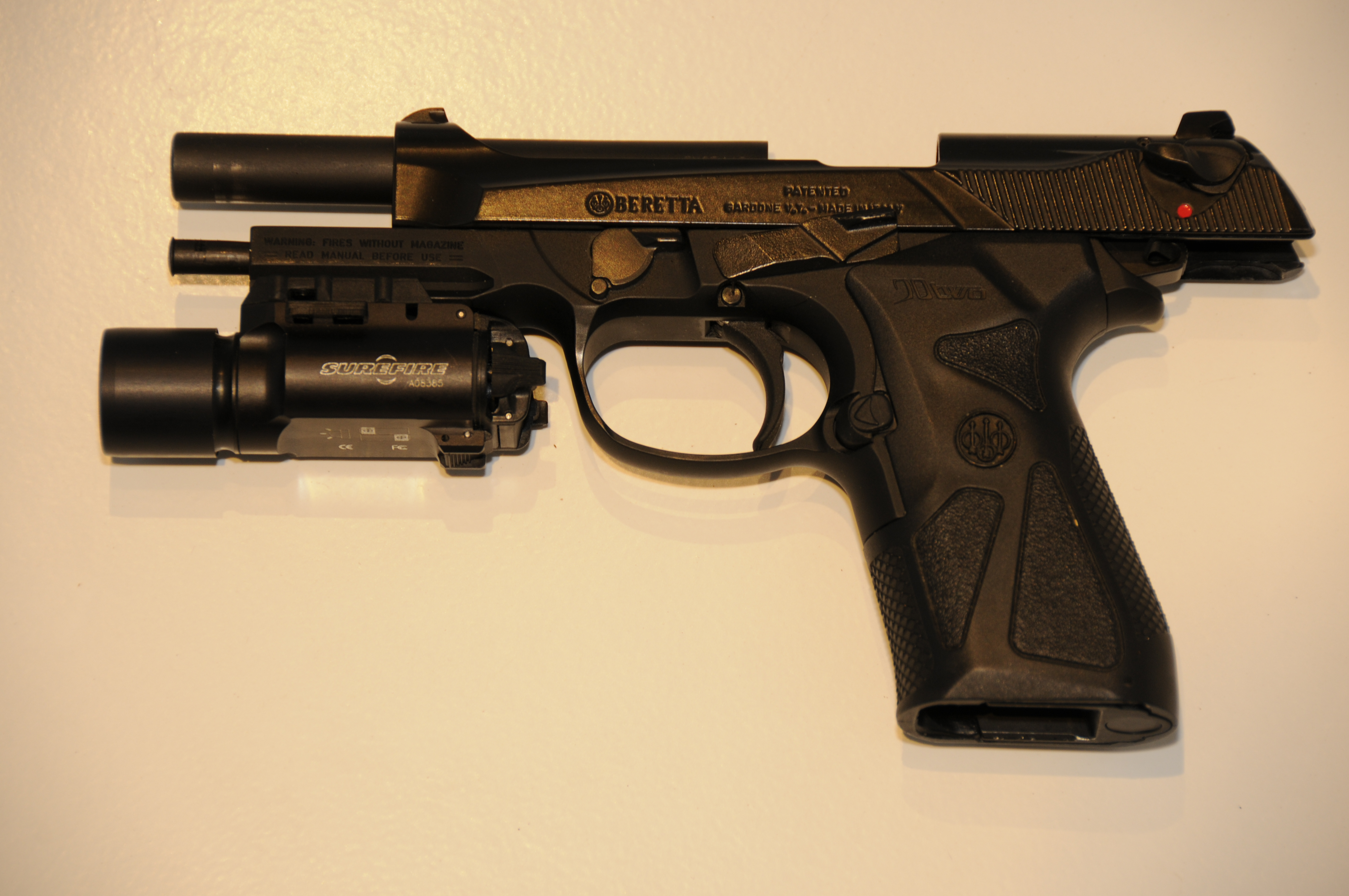
Slide open with a SureFire flashlight mounted on the Picatinny rail

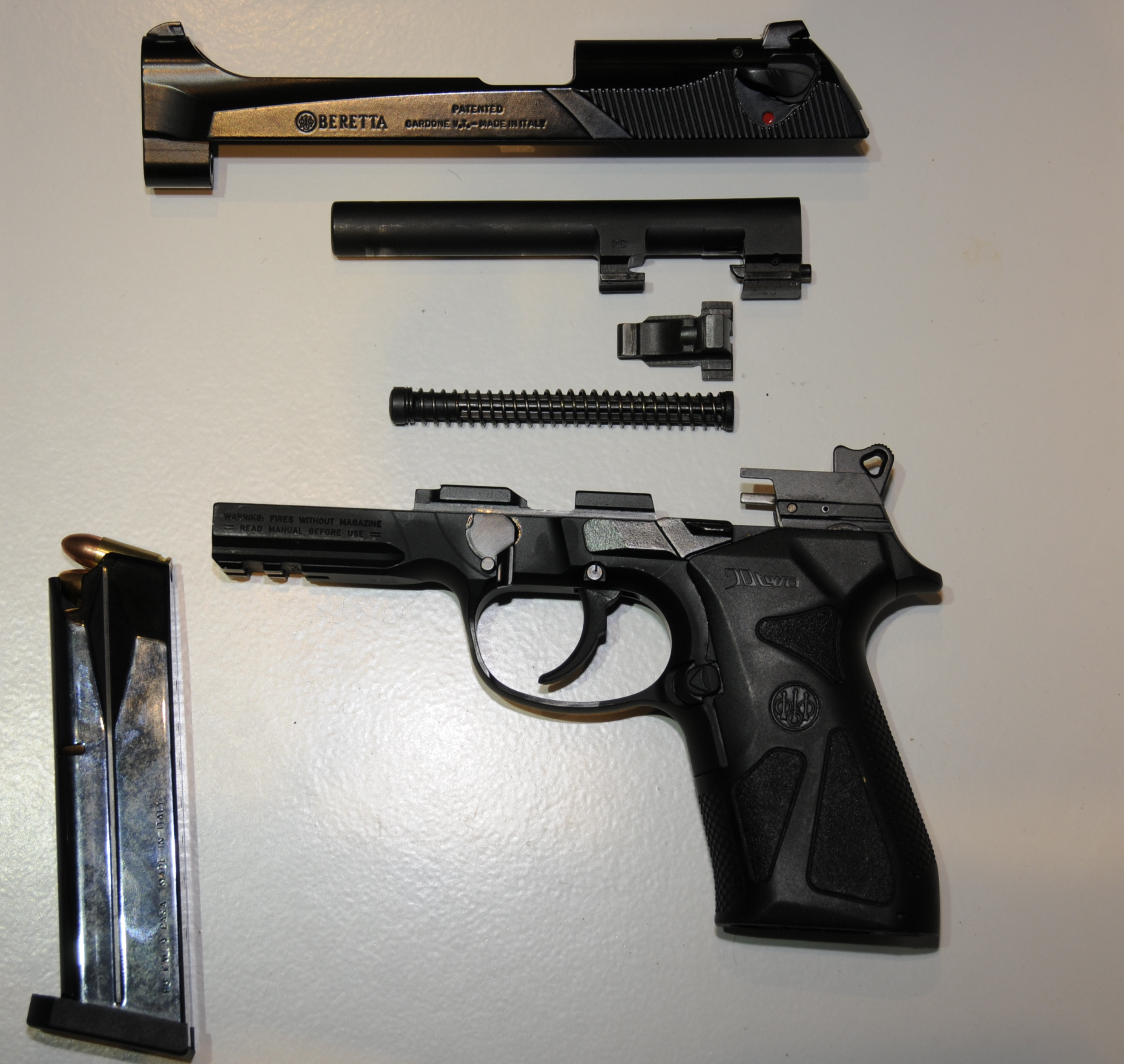
Field stripped, with a 17-round magazine

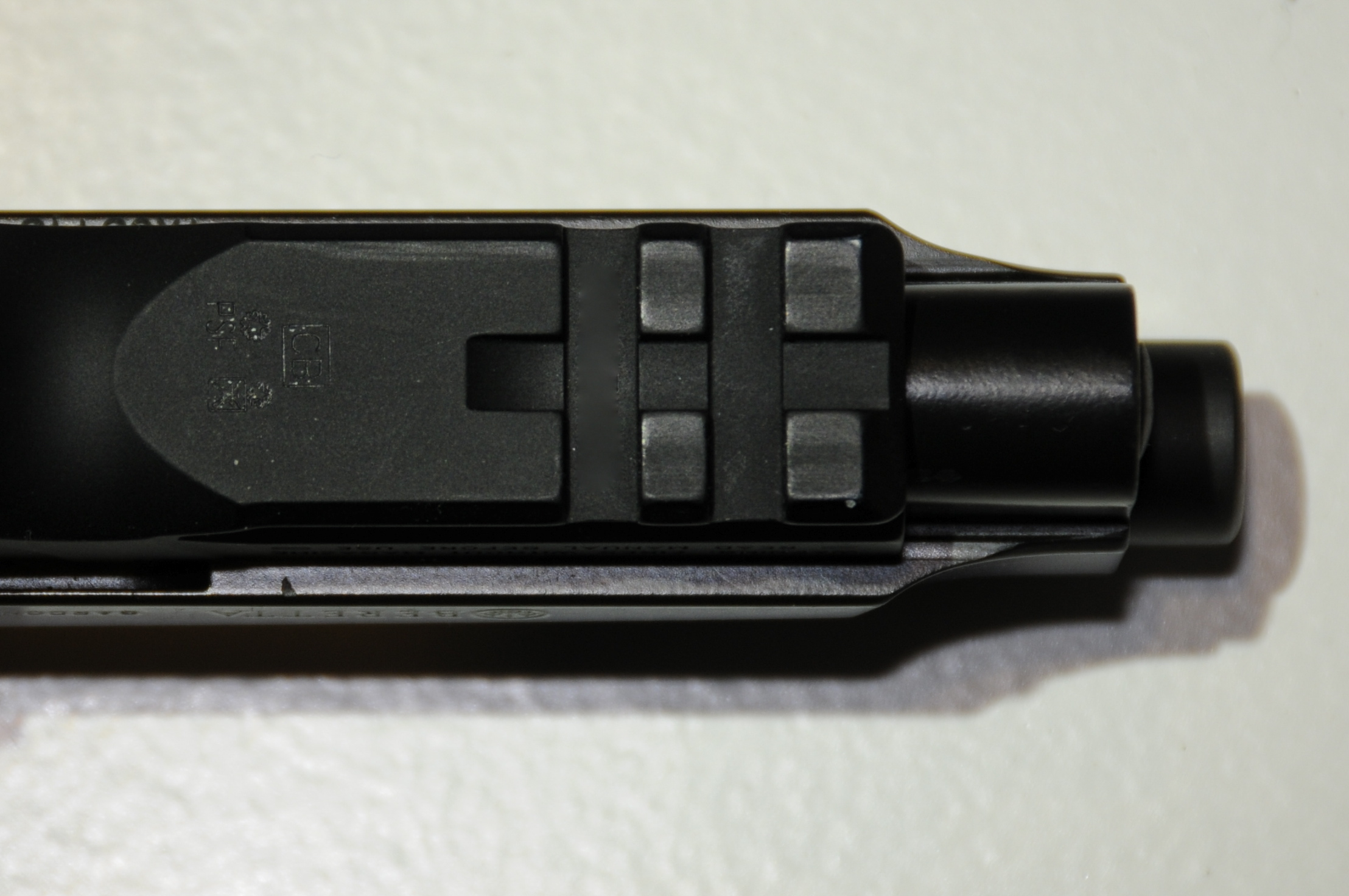
Bottom view of the Picatinny rail

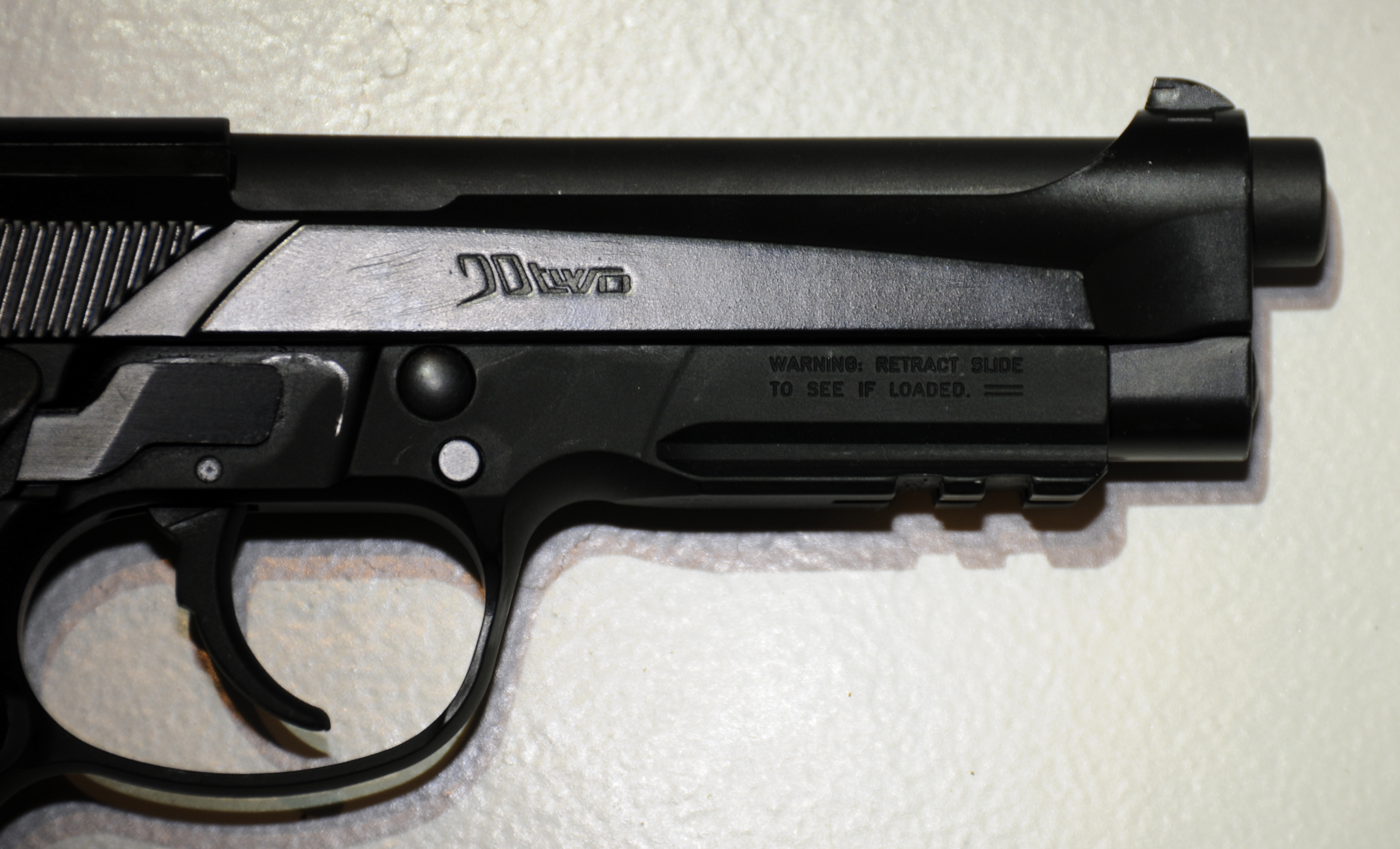
The Picatinny rail without the accessory rail cover
