= Beretta 682 =

- Type: Double barreled shotgun
- Place of origin: Italy

Production history
- Manufacturer: Beretta
- Produced: 1984–present
- Variants: S, Gold, Gold E, Sporting, Skeet, Trap

Specifications
- Barrel length: 26, 28, 30, 32 or 34 inches
- Caliber: 12, 20, or 28 gauge or .410 bore

The Beretta 682 (also known as the S682, 682 Gold, and 682 Gold E) is a competition grade over-under shotgun. It is manufactured, marketed, and distributed by Fabbrica d'Armi Pietro Beretta, in Gardone Val Trompia, Italy.

The 682 comes in various grades for sporting clays, trap and skeet shooting.

== Versions ==
There are two primary versions of the action of the Beretta 682 shotgun. The first version of the action is the original version, designated by a model number such as S682305T, and made at least through 1994. These earlier models are known as "wide" or "large" frame 682s. At some point, Beretta dropped the "S" from the front of the 682 model number, narrowed the receiver, introduced a new choke system, and reduced the barrel weight as well. This new model is consistent in width (or "narrow") with the 686 and 687 lines.

The wood components from a current narrow 682/686/687 [1.525 inches, 38.7 mm] will not fit on an older S682 wide receiver [1.585 inches, 40.3 mm] shotgun; replacement stocks for wide 682 shotguns need to be custom made at this point. Other than serial number lookup for production year, measurement of the frame size is the width measured in front of the breech across the recoil shoulders.

The older and newer models share many of the same parts, and barrel sets from narrow 682 shotguns can be used without issue in the wide S682 shotgun. However, there is only a small chance that a new model 682 barrel with drop in place and work properly on an older wide frame S682. Obviously, there will be a very small lip present where the narrow barrel doesn't exactly match the wide receiver. One of the most common issues with simply dropping an unfitted barrel into a S682 is that the ejectors may not work / be times properly.

The primary reason given for the receiver design changes are generally thought to be related to weight savings for Olympic competition shotguns, such as the S682 and subsequent 682/686/687 models.
