= Beretta 8000 =

Type of semi-automatic pistol

Beretta 8000 Cougar
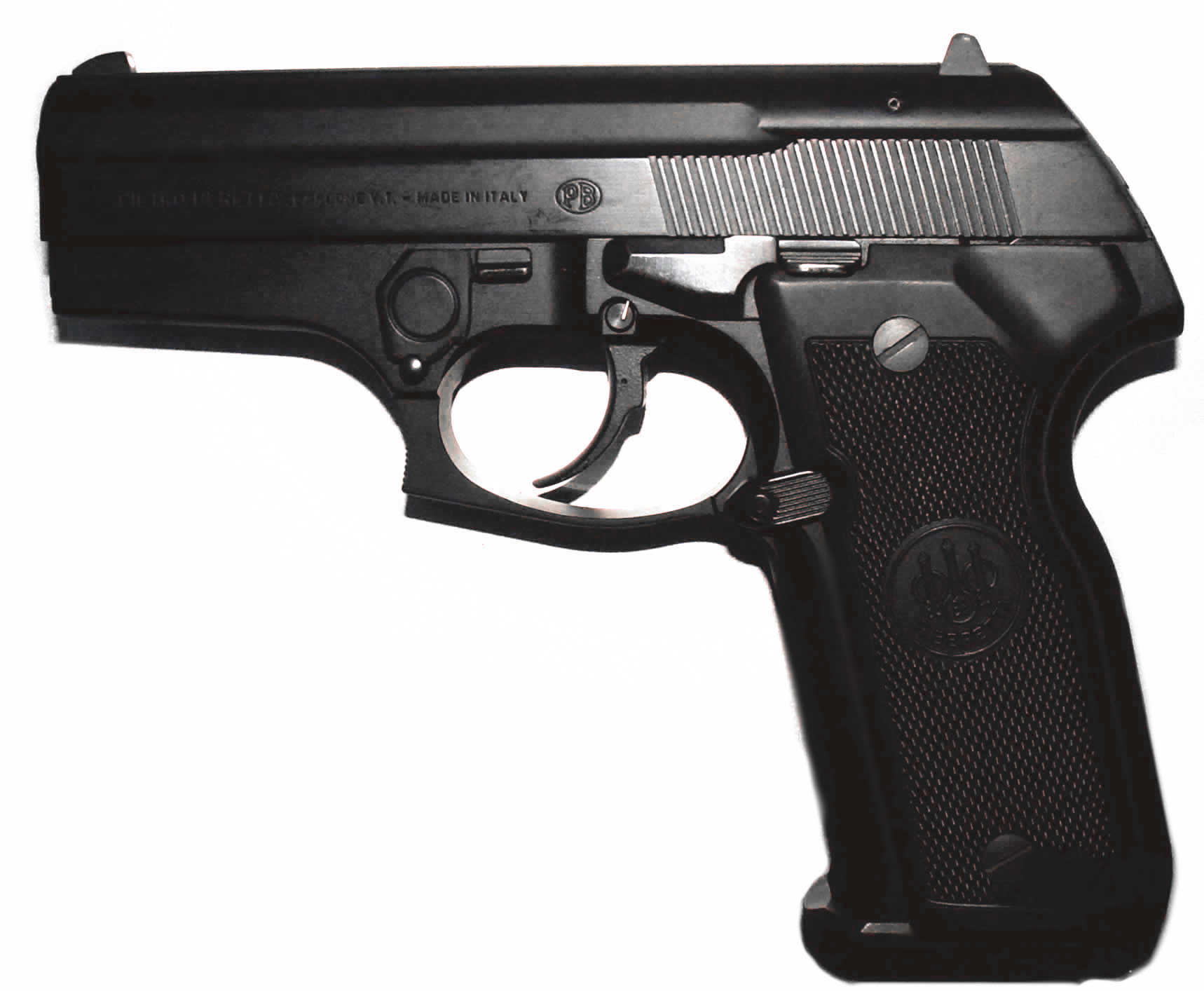
- Beretta 8000 D Pistol
- Type: Semi-automatic pistol
- Place of origin: Italy

Service history
- Used by: See Users

Production history
- Manufacturer: Beretta
- Produced: 1994–2004; 2004–present (Stoeger Cougar)

Specifications
- Mass: 900–925 g; 2.03 lbs; 800 g (8000L); 850 g (8000L Type P)
- Length: 180 mm (7 in); 183 mm (7.2 in) (8045)
- Barrel length: 92 mm (3.6 in); 94 mm (3.7 in) (8045); 102 mm (4.0 in) (for the LAPD)
- Caliber: 9×19 mm (8000); .357 SIG (8357); .40 S&W (8040); .45 ACP (8045)
- Action: Recoil operated (locked breech)
- Feed system: (8000) 15-round magazine; (8000L) 13-round magazine; (8357/8040) 11-round magazine; (8045) 8-round magazine
- Sights: Iron sights

The Beretta 8000 (Cougar) is a family of rotating barrel semi-automatic pistols that were designed and manufactured by Beretta of Italy. It was produced in multiple calibers and configurations, and is still being produced by Stoeger, who purchased the design from Beretta in 2004.

== History ==
They first appeared on the market in 1994 as a more compact alternative to the full-sized Beretta 92 service pistol in order to offer a compromise between concealability, ease of carry, accuracy and firepower. The 8000 series was originally developed around the .40 S&W cartridge, which was a new cartridge at the time. This allowed it to easily be converted to other calibers, such as .357 SIG and the less powerful 9x19mm. The Cougar series was later also manufactured in .45 ACP. These pistols are suitable for use by both police and for civilian self-defense. The pistols were discontinued in 2004 because the Cougar line never was the success Beretta had hoped for in the United States due to its metal frame. Beretta replaced the Cougar line with the similar Beretta Px4 Storm line, essentially the same design but with a polymer frame. Beretta then sold the design to Stoeger, who continues to produce the gun for international markets.

== Description ==
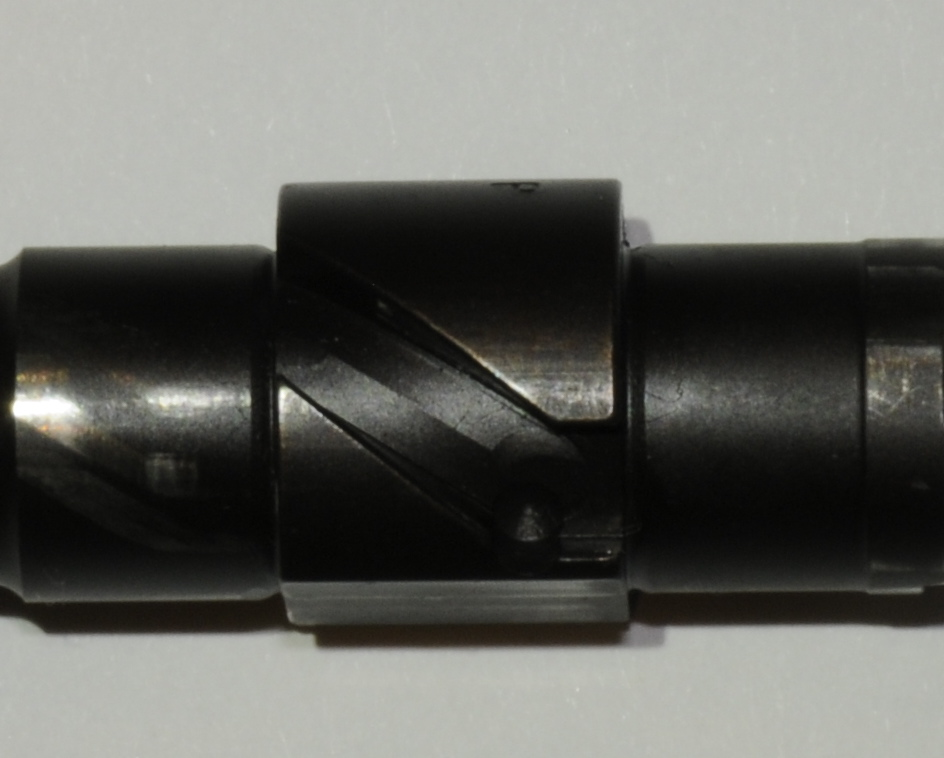
Rotating barrel locking rail.

Cougar 8000 series pistols are recoil-operated, locked breech semi-automatic pistols. These pistols use a relatively rare rotating barrel locking system, in which the barrel rotates on recoil to unlock itself from the slide. The rotating motion of the barrel is controlled by the stud on its bottom, which follows the cam track in the steel frame insert. The rotating barrel allows for lower recoil despite a smaller overall size and lower weight than a standard Beretta 92FS.

The frame is made from lightweight aluminum alloy. The basic version of the Cougar pistol is the F model, with double-action trigger with exposed hammer, and ambidextrous safety/decocker levers, located on the slide. Alternative is D version, which is double-action only, and thus have spurless hammer and no safety/decocker levers. Cougar pistols use double-stack magazines in 9 mm, .357 SIG and .40 caliber models, and staggered column magazines in .45 caliber models.

== Variants ==
The 8000 series is available in several calibers and in either "F", "G" or "D" configuration.

=== Calibers ===
- 8000: 9×19mm, 15-round magazine capacity
- 8000F: .41 AE
- 8000L: 9×19mm, lighter, more compact, 13-round magazine capacity
- 8000L Type P: 9×19mm, lighter, more compact, 15-round magazine capacity
- 8357: .357 SIG, 11-round magazine capacity
- 8040: .40 S&W, 11-round magazine capacity
- 8045: .45 ACP, 8-round magazine capacity

European models were offered in .41 Action Express and 9×21mm.

=== F configuration ===
The F specification is the basic version with double-action trigger, exposed hammer, and ambidextrous safety/decocking levers (located on the slide).

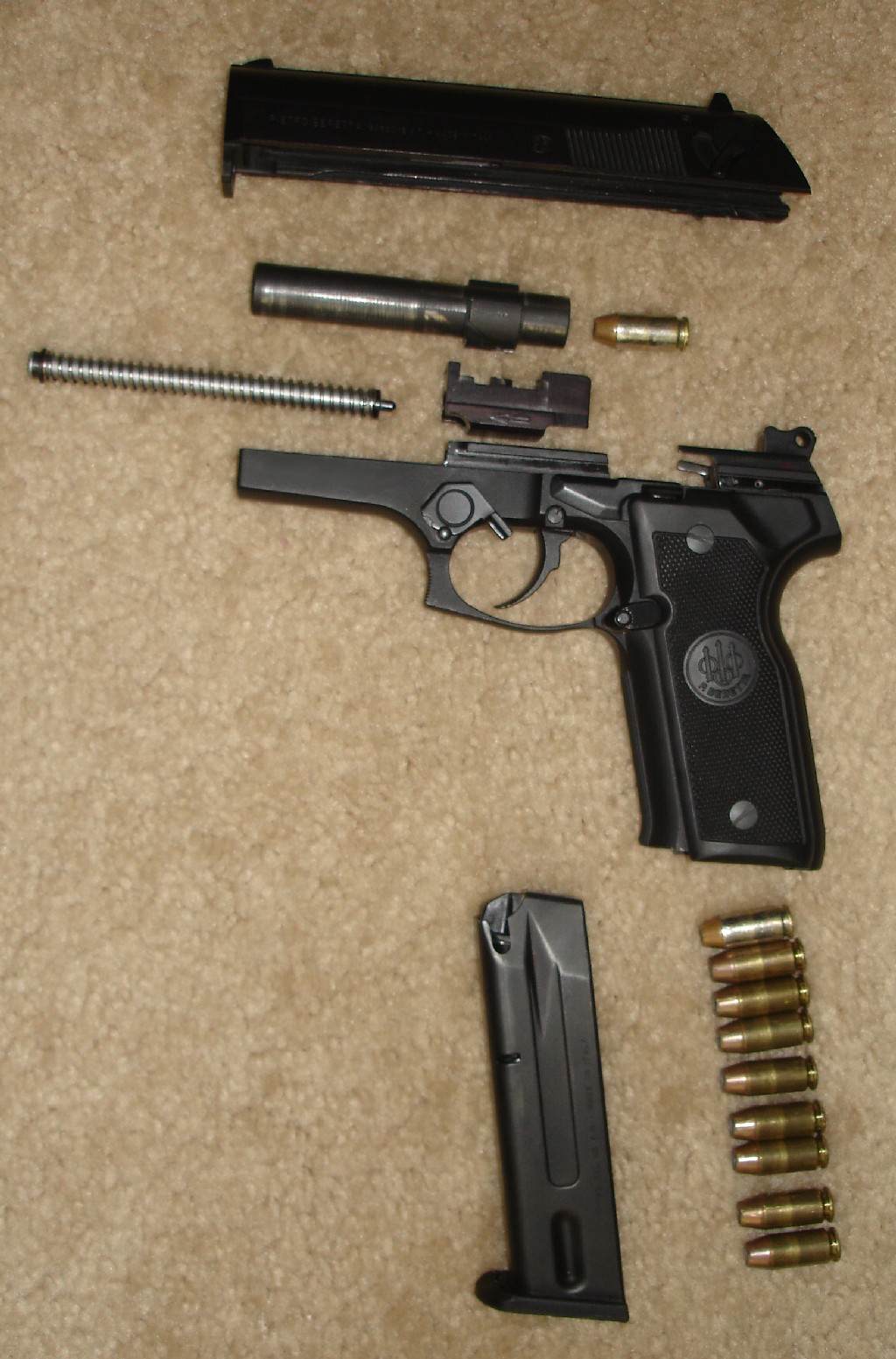
Beretta 8040 Cougar Pistol disassembled to show parts.

=== D configuration ===
The D specification is double-action only ("DAO") with a spurless hammer and no safety/decocking levers.

=== G configuration ===
The G specification is a DA/SA variant with a "decock" only feature. It features an exposed hammer with ambidextrous decocking levers (on the slide). There is no safety on this model.

=== T configuration ===
The T specification includes a tactical rail.

=== Mini Cougar ===
The 8000, 8040 and 8045 are available in a Mini variant weighing 140 g less than the respective models and with a grip that is 25 mm shorter. The slide and barrel are the same length as the full size pistols. This variant is available in the "D" and "F" configurations.

=== Inox ===
Some models are available as an Inox version which has a stainless steel slide, barrel and other components.

=== 8045 Cougar ===
The 8045 Beretta Cougar was produced between 1998 and 2004 in the D and F configuration. A Mini 8045 Cougar was also produced in the same configurations. No factory 8045 Cougars were produced in the "G" configuration, but prototype Cougars do exist in the G configuration as well as with a light rail.

=== 8045 Cat Pack ===
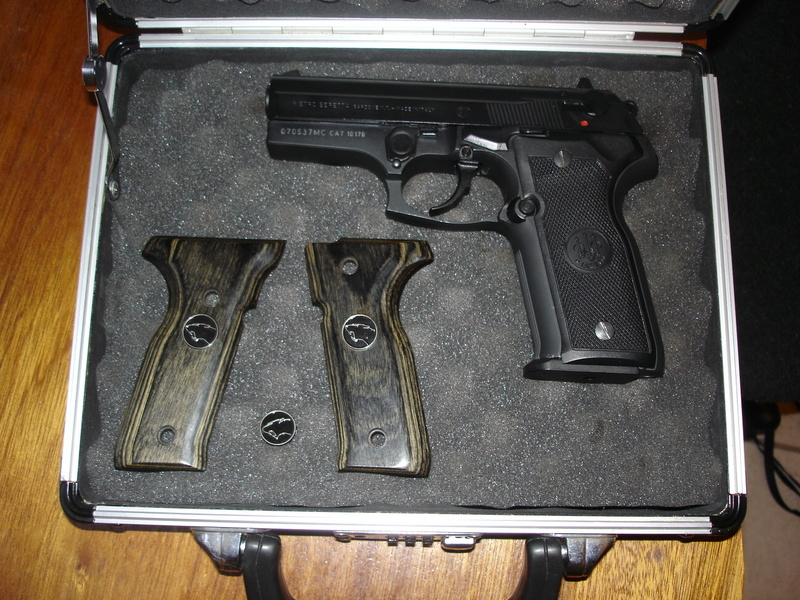

In 1999, Beretta USA offered 2000 special edition kits to accompany the 8045F Cougar. Accompanying the basic 8045F was a kit consisting of a special edition case, lapel pin and charcoal laminate grips with inlaid cougar medallions. The pistol comes in the 8045F model which is a double/single-action-type pistol. Standard white dot sights and factory black plastic grips are standard with the "Pak" consisting of the case, wood grips and pin.

=== 8045 LAPD ===
Beretta USA made an 8045F for the Los Angeles Police Department. One requirement of the LAPD using these firearms was the inclusion of a 4-inch barrel. There were a limited number of these longer barrels produced to meet this need. Some barrels were shipped to the LAPD to be added and some were shipped directly from the factory already assembled in the pistols. However, BUSA had offered these barrels for sale to military/law enforcement officers for $198 only for a brief period. Some of these pistols were converted to a "G" model (decock only) by various agencies but were not offered in this configuration from Beretta USA.

== Stoeger Cougar ==
In 2004, following Beretta's acquisition of Stoeger Industries through Benelli, marketing and distribution of the Cougar was transferred to Stoeger. In 2006, Stoeger Cougars began being sold in 9×19mm, .45 ACP, and .40 S&W, made in Turkey on Beretta factory tooling. Stoeger also added a more compact-sized Cougar pistol to their production line, which has a reduced magazine capacity of 13 rounds and MSRP is US$50 less than its full-size counterpart. Stoeger's later .45 Cougars also included an accessory rail. The Stoeger Cougar was quietly discontinued from the American market around 2017, but it remains actively listed on Stoeger's international and Turkish manufacturing website. Because Stoeger Silah Sanayi still maintains the factory tooling, they are still producing the Stoeger Cougar line in all three calibers for international military, law enforcement, and commercial markets, where all-metal double-action pistols still remain highly popular.

== Users ==
- Italy
- Kazakhstan - since 2007 used as service pistol in private security companies
- Slovenia
- United States - North Carolina Highway Patrol used the Model 8357 357 SIG, Los Angeles Police Department authorizes the weapon for duty carry, Utah Highway Patrol issued the Model 8040 in .40 S&W, as well as some city and sheriffs agencies throughout the country. The New York City Police Department still authorizes the 8000D (double action only) variant for off-duty and backup carry, but as the pistol must be in new condition and manufactured by Beretta, the pistol is slowly aging out of use as no new pistols are being manufactured, and therefore cannot be acquired by new officers.
