= Beretta M1951 =

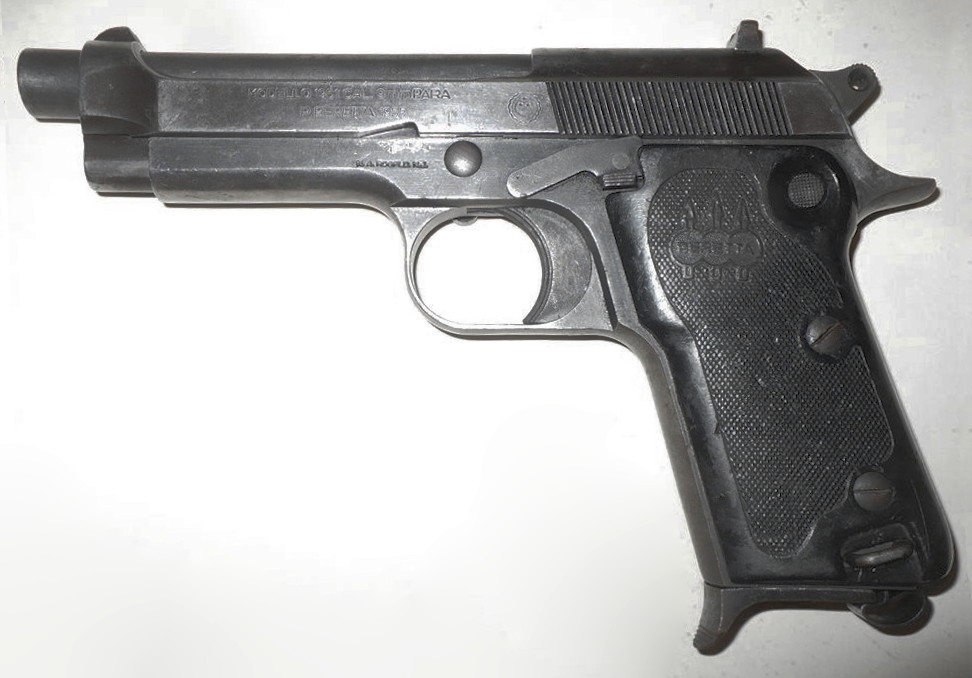
- Egyptian Contract M1951 Pistol
- Type: Semi-automatic pistol
- Place of origin: Italy

Service history
- Used by: See Users
- Wars: Lebanese Civil War; Iran–Iraq War; Persian Gulf War; Iraq War; Syrian civil war

Production history
- Designer: Tullio Marengoni
- Manufacturer: Beretta
- Produced: 1949–1980 (Beretta); 1949–present (licensed derivatives)
- Variants: Helwan, M951 "Brigadier", M951R, M952, M952 "Special", M952 "Target"

Specifications
- Mass: 870 grams (31 oz) (M1951); 1,350 g (48 oz) (M951R)
- Length: 203 millimetres (8.0 in) (M1951); Approx. 215 mm (8.5 in) (M951R)
- Barrel length: 114.2 mm (4.5 in) (M1951); 125 mm (4.9 in) (M951R)
- Cartridge: 9×19mm Parabellum (M1951, M951 "Brigadier", M951R); 7.65×21mm Parabellum (M952, M952 "Sport", M952 "Target")
- Action: Short recoil, locked breech
- Muzzle velocity: 360 m/s (1,181 ft/s) (M1951); 375 m/s (1,230.3 ft/s) (M951R)
- Effective firing range: Sights fixed for 50 m
- Feed system: 8-round detachable box magazine 10-round magazine (M951R)
- Sights: Fixed iron sights, front–blade, rear–notch

The Beretta M1951 is a 9×19mm semi-automatic pistol developed during the late 1940s and early 1950s by Pietro Beretta S.p.A. of Italy. The pistol was produced strictly for military use and was introduced into service with the Italian Armed Forces and other Italian security forces as the Modello 1951 (M1951), replacing the Modello 1934 pistol chambered for the 9×17mm Short (.380 ACP) cartridge.

== History ==
The Beretta M1951 was Beretta's first locked-breech design on the market. (Previous Beretta semi-automatic pistols were all blowback-operated.) It was in limited production circa 1953 and in full-scale production from 1956 to 1980.

The initial production batch featured a lightweight alloy frame, which proved to be unable to withstand the shock of the relatively high-powered 9×19mm Parabellum round in the long run.

This version of the Beretta M1951 was replaced around 1955 by the steel-framed "second series" model. (Although in 1975 and 1976, a small number of alloy-framed Beretta M1951s were made using the new alloy developed for the soon-to-be-released Beretta 92 pistol.) The "second series" Beretta M1951 was nearly 250 grams heavier than the alloy version, but the balance was improved. A special version of this "second series," the Egyptian Contract Model 951, was modified according to the wishes of the military of the Egyptian Arab Republic, who placed Beretta in competition with the Hungary's Tokarev to become its primary supplier of sidearms. The Egyptian Contract Model 951's particular modifications included larger sights, a simplified, narrower grip and an external thumb-spring magazine release, a departure from the push-button release in the lower-right grip of the M1951s. The Egyptians appreciated the Egyptian Contract Beretta Model 951's accuracy, power and uncanny reliability in desert conditions, and approximately 50,000 were produced. Despite intense pressure and incentives from the Soviet bloc, Tokarev's challenger, dubbed the "Tokagypt," was produced in comparatively small quantities.

The "third series" model was the definitive version. Its lengthened slide further improved the pistol's balance. The relatively large sights of the Egyptian Contract Model 951 were replaced by the original, smaller, unobtrusive sights, which were less likely to snag on a holster. Serial production of this definitive version initiated in Italy in 1955, and in Egypt in the early 1960s. The M1951 is no longer produced in Italy and was never adopted by the Italian Army. The Italian Army opted to keep the .380 ACP Beretta M1934 in service until the adoption of the 9×19mm Beretta 92. The M1951 was adopted by the Italian Navy, the Carabinieri and the Italian national Traffic Police but was replaced in all services with the above-mentioned Beretta 92 in 1977. Other countries to have adopted the M1951 include Egypt—where it has been produced by the local firm Maadi as the Helwan—Israel, Iraq—where it is license-built as the Tariq), Nigeria, Libya and Tunisia. In most of these countries, the pistol is now out of service. On the civilian market, the pistol is known as the M951 "Brigadier." After 1968, in the United States, it was briefly referred to as the 104 in promotional literature.

== Design details ==
The M1951 is a short recoil–operated, locked breech pistol with a vertically falling locking piece and an open top slide (the locking mechanism design was influenced by the Walther P38 pistol). The locking piece, located under the barrel, is unlocked by a sliding pin and locked back into battery by a beveled surface on the pistol's frame. The locking piece features two locking lugs that engage appropriate recesses cut into the slide's internal side surfaces. When the pistol is fired, the locking piece, integral with the slide, recoils together with the barrel which is locked to the slide. After a brief period of unrestricted travel of approx. 13 mm (0.5 in) the unlocking pin on the rear barrel lug strikes the receiver and stops. As the barrel and slide continue back, the locking piece strikes the stationary plunger and is forced down into recesses in the slide. The barrel comes to rest but the slide continues rearward for a further 50 mm (2.0 in). Upon forward return, the slide picks up the barrel and the locking piece on the barrel lug is lifted up by the receiver cam to lock the barrel to the slide. The spring-loaded extractor is integrated into the slide, and the fixed-type ejector is integral to the pistol's frame. The pistol has a hammer striking mechanism (with an exposed hammer) and a single-action trigger with a disconnector, which enables semi-automatic fire only. A cross-bolt safety mounted on the weapon's frame (beneath the hammer) provides safe operation with a cartridge introduced into the chamber. In the “weapon safe” position (the safety's button pushed in to the left) the slide catch is disabled.

The M1951 is fed from an 8-round detachable box magazine. A hold open device will keep the slide locked open after discharging the last cartridge from the magazine. The slide can then be released by depressing the slide release lever located on the left side of the frame. The pistol uses fixed iron sights set for engaging targets at 50 m. These consist of a forward blade and rear notch.

The pistol's barrel has a rifled bore with 6 right-hand grooves and a 1 in 254 mm (1:10 in) twist rate.

The M1951 pistol is chambered for the 9×19mm Parabellum cartridge.

== Variants ==
The Modello 952 is a commercial version of the M1951 chambered in 7.65×21mm Parabellum. Produced for sales to sport shooters in Italy in order to comply with restrictions forbidding ownership of military caliber pistols. This model was available in two variants: the “Target” and “Special” models. The "Target" version of the 952 incorporated modifications to the grips, sights and barrel that had originally been introduced on the "Berhama" target-shooting model of the 9mm 951 made specially for the Egyptians.

The M951R is a select fire version of the M1951 chambered in 9 mm Parabellum. The "R" stands for Raffica, which is Italian for "volley", "flurry", or "burst" (sometimes spoken "R" as "Rapid" in English), which was designed and produced during the 1960s in response to a request made by the Italian special forces. The primary difference between the M951R and the original M1951 lied in the fire selector lever mounted on the right side of the weapon’s frame, enabling either semi-automatic or continuous fire - labelled "SEM" and "AUT", respectively. Additionally, the weapon has a heavier slide, a folding wooden forward grip, the barrel was extended, and so was the magazine, increasing capacity to 10 rounds. The M951R had a rate of fire of approximately 1000 rounds/min. The M951R was issued to several Italian special forces and to a lesser extent to the Carabinieri and the Polizia di Stato all along the 1960s; it had poor success and quickly went out of production, as it was plagued by several defects: the ammunition capacity was low compared to the rate of fire and, with the selector on the "AUT" position, the M951R fired in full-automatic mode rather than by three-rounds bursts as other similar products of the following years; this produced high recoil and resulted in poor controllability and scarce accuracy. Furthermore, with such a high rate of fire, even with extensive training it was impossible for the shooter to produce short and controlled bursts, and as reported by many users the shortest burst one could achieve was five-rounds.

The Helwan is a license produced Beretta M1951 for the Egyptian Army. Produced by Maadi after the adopation of the M1951.

== Users ==
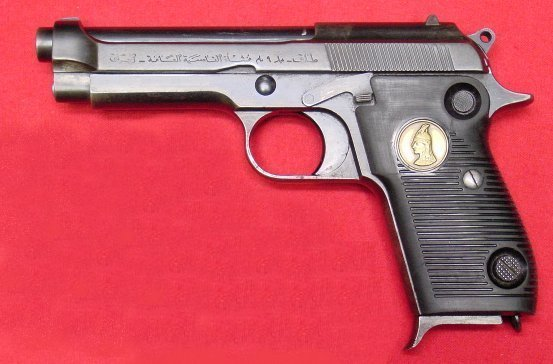
Blued-steel Iraqi Tariq

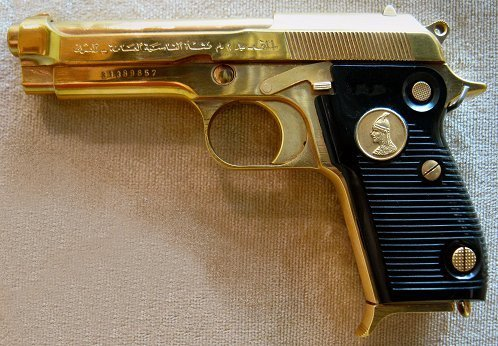
Gold-plated Iraqi Tariq presentation pistol

- Egypt: Special Egyptian Contract guns marked with National crest. Later licensed by Maadi and produced as the Helwan.
- Haiti
- Iraq: Manufactured under license as the Tariq by Al-Qādisiyyah Establishments from 1981 onwards. Production stopped in 2003 and resumed from 2009 onwards. The internal design appears identical to the original pistols, and the primary external differences are the Arabic stamping on the slide and the warrior emblem (the medieval Arab-Berber warrior Tariq ibn Ziyad—who invaded Iberia in 711 A.D.) on the grip. Gold-plated guns were produced for presentation and some pistols have special inscriptions. The Tariq pistol is currently in service with the Iraqi Police and the Kurdish Asayish and Zeravani, and was in service as the standard pistol of the Iraqi Armed Forces and the Republican Guard; pistols issued to Saddam Hussein's Private Police have a special marking on the frame. Iraq produces them locally
- Iran: Used captured Iraqi "Tariq" pistols known only as "Beretta" in duty service.
- Israel
- Italy
- Libya
- Mali: People's Movement for the Liberation of Azawad
- Nigeria
- Thailand
- Tunisia
- United Kingdom: In 1954 the Beretta M1951 was selected as the standard sidearm of the Metropolitan Police's Special Branch and Royalty Protective Officers
- Yemen

=== Non-state actors ===
- Hayat Tahrir al-Sham: Captured from ISIL.
- Islamic State
