= TPG-1 =

Unique Alpine TPG-1
- Type: Sniper rifle
- Place of origin: Germany

Production history
- Designed: 2000
- Manufacturer: Unique Alpine AG
- Produced: 2000 - 2014
- No. built: 4500
- Variants: 4

Specifications
- Caliber: from 5.56×45mm NATO up to .338 Lapua Magnum
- Barrels: 650 mm (26 in); 700 mm (28 in) for .338 Lapua Magnum
- Action: Bolt action
- Maximum firing range: 1500m
- Feed system: 5 round detachable box magazine
- Sights: Variable telescopic sight

The Unique Alpine TPG-1 [where "TPG" stands for German: Taktisches Präzisionsgewehr ("Tactical Precision Rifle")] is a modular, multi-caliber, tactical applications precision sniper rifle made in Bavaria / Federal Republic of Germany. This rifle is part of the equipment of the Hungarian police.

== Users ==
- Germany: SEK Niedersachsen (Special Deployment Force)SEK Mecklenburg Vorpommern (Special Deployment Force)
- Hungary: Hungarian police
- Bosnia and Herzegovina - Federal Ministry of Internal Affairs (FMUP)
