= Charles Daly firearms =

American firearms company (1875–1919)

Charles Daly
- Type: Privately held company
- Industry: Firearms
- Founded: New York City, US (1875; 151 years ago)
- Defunct: 1919; 107 years ago
- Fate: Acquired
- Successor: Henry Modell
- Headquarters: United States
- Key people: Charles Daly Founder, August Shoverling co-Founder, Joseph Gales Partner

Charles Daly is a brand of firearms licensed to Chiappa Firearms located in Italy. It was a firearms manufacturer and importer located in Harrisburg, Pennsylvania, in the United States.

== History ==
Charles Daly was born in New York City on October 12, 1839. Around 1875 in New York City, Charles Daly and August Schoverling began importing firearms into the United States, primarily from the city of Suhl in what was then Prussia. Manufacturers for Daly at that time included Heym, Shiller, H. A. Lindner, Sauer, J&W Tolley of England, Newman (of Belgium) and Lefever Arms.

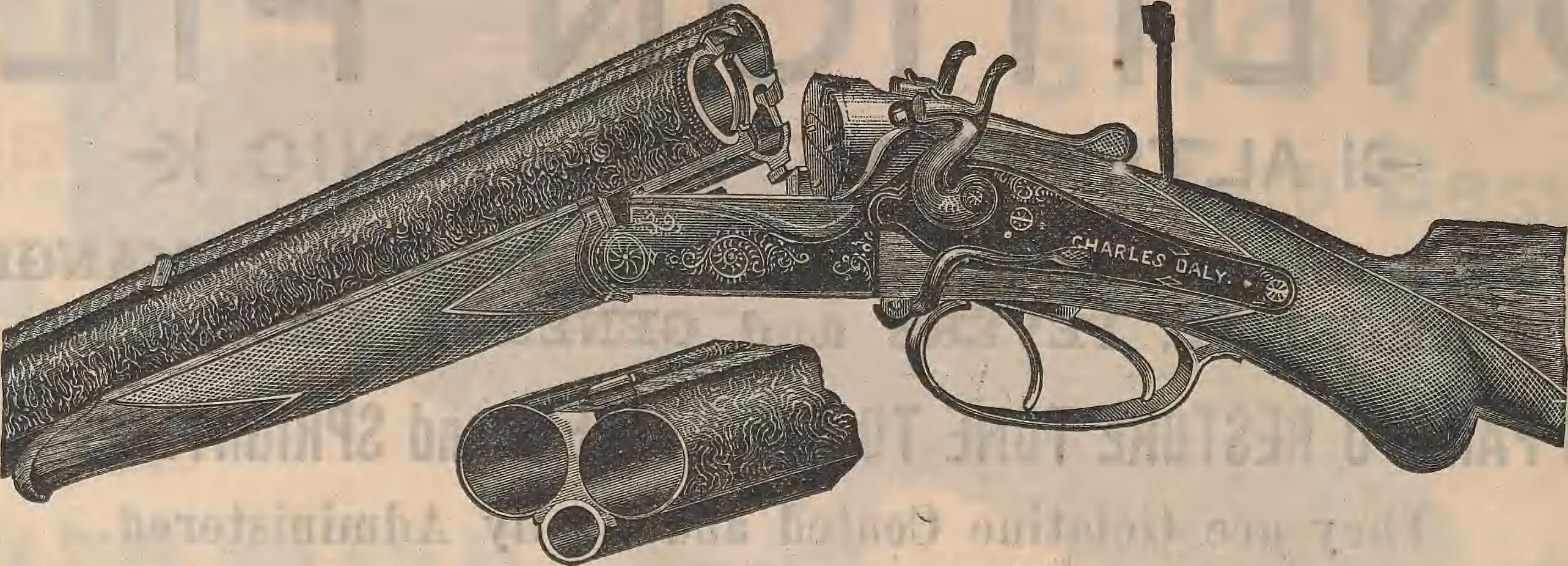
Charles Daly combination gun advertisement (1887)

In 1887 Schoverling and Daly were joined by a third partner named Joseph Gales, and the company began doing business as Schoverling, Daly, and Gales, before settling simply on the name Charles Daly. The original Charles Daly died suddenly in 1899, but the business continued with his son, Charles Howard Daly, taking his place until 1919 when Henry Modell purchased the partnership.

The new owners continued importing firearms and marketing them with the Charles Daly name until the late 1920s when the company was sold to the Walzer family, which owned Sloan's Sporting Goods in Ridgefield, Connecticut. The Walzers established a branch of Sloan's in New York City known as Charles Daly & Company. Manufacturers from all over the world produced Daly guns for the Walzers, including Beretta, Bernadelli, and Miroku.

In 1976, Sloan's sold the Charles Daly trademark to Outdoor Sports Headquarters Inc. (OSHI), a sporting goods wholesaler in Dayton, Ohio. In 1996, OSHI was sold to another firearm wholesaler, Jerry's Sport Center, in Forest City, Pennsylvania.

In 1996 the brand was acquired by KBI, Inc. of Harrisburg, Pennsylvania, which expanded the import line to include semi-auto and pump-action shotguns and 1911-style pistols and re-christened the company as Charles Daly, The Shooting Sports Specialist.

In 2008, KBI formed a new division of the company named Charles Daly Defense to manufacture and market AR-15-type semi-automatic carbines and rifles for law enforcement and civilian markets. In a departure from the company’s tradition of selling only imported firearms, Charles Daly manufactured Defense AR-15s in the United States.

A letter from Michael Kassnar posted on the Charles Daly Website on January 29, 2010, indicated that Charles Daly and KBI were going out of business and closing their doors effective January 29, 2010.

At the SHOT Show held in Las Vegas in January 2012, Charles Daly and CD Defense announced their return to the U.S. market with distribution by Trans World Arms LLC of Harrisburg, Pennsylvania.

In September 2012, Samco Global Arms, Inc. (SGAI), located in Miami, Florida, acquired the Charles Daly trademark and is importing firearms under the Charles Daly brand for the U.S. market.

In 2017, Chiappa Firearms of Italy acquired the Charles Daly trademark.

== Firearms imported and manufactured ==
The firearms Charles Daly imports and manufactures vary:

- Handguns: 1911 steel-framed pistols, from 1998 until 2008 from Armscor in the Philippines. In 2020 the Daly 1911 saw updates with 3 variations being produced in Brixia, Italy. Known as the "Empire, Superior, and Field, Grades." Empire Grade being their top tier pistol is available with a dark blued or chrome finish as is the Superior Grade. The Field Grade is only available in the blued finish, and is said to be a fairly accurate representation of the M1911 pistol formally adopted by the U.S. Navy and Marine Corps in 1913.

Since 2009, BUL Transmark in Israel has produced the new G4 model. M-5 polymer-framed 1911 pistols from BUL Transmark since 1997. A clone of the Browning Hi-Power was produced in the United States from 2002 to 2006 with components from FEG in Hungary and final manufacturing by either Dan Wesson Firearms or Magnum Research in the United States. 1873 style single action revolvers were manufactured by F.LLI Pietta of Italy in the mid-2000s.

- While not technically under the Charles Daly brand, KBI resumed importing the Jericho 941 Pistols from Israel Weapons Industries (IWI) Ltd. in 2009.
- Rifles: Bolt action Mauser and Mini-Mauser rifles were produced by Zastava Arms in Serbia from 2002 until 2005. Armi Sport de Chiappa produces 1892 lever action rifles in Italy. In 2008, it entered the AR-15 market with a U.S.-produced line of AR-15-type rifles and carbines under the Charles Daly Defense brand.
- Shotguns: Over and under, side by side, pump action, and semi-automatics are currently produced in Turkey. All of the pumps and semi-autos are made by Akkar in Istanbul, but Sarsilmaz and ATA also produced semi-autos for Daly during the mid-2000s. SGAI is importing over-and-under, pump action, and semi-automatics made by the Akkar factory in Istanbul, Turkey. Between 1996 and 2005, side by sides came from Zabala Hermanos in Spain, and over-and-unders came from Sabatti in Italy. From the mid-1960s to the mid-1970s, Miroku of Japan, the producer of Browning shotguns and rifles, manufactured the over & under shotguns for Daly.

== Notes and references ==
On September 16, 2013, additional information was updated by Ghulam Jilani Dossul, President of SGAI, importer of Charles Daly Firearms.
