= 1993 Oxnard unemployment office shooting =

Mass shooting in California, US

- Police at the scene of the shooting
- Location of the EDD office in Oxnard, California
- Location: 34°13′13″N 119°10′48″W; 1960 North C Street, Oxnard, California, US
- Date: December 2, 1993; 32 years ago 11:41 – 11:54 a.m. (PST; UTC−08:00)
- Target: EDD offices and employees
- Attack type: Mass shooting; mass murder; shootout
- Weapons: 12-gauge Browning BPS pump-action shotgun; Smith & Wesson Model 29 .44 Magnum revolver; .300 Winchester Magnum Browning A-Bolt bolt-action rifle (fitted with a telescopic sight); .223 Remington Ruger Mini-14 semi-automatic rifle
- Deaths: 5 (including the perpetrator)
- Injuries: 4
- Perpetrator: Alan Douglas Winterbourne
- Motive: Perceived grievances regarding long-term unemployment

On December 2, 1993, a mass shooting occurred at a Employment Development Department (EDD) office in Oxnard, California, United States. Driven by perceived grievances over his long-term unemployment, 33-year-old Alan Douglas Winterbourne, opened fire inside the building, killing three people and wounding four others. He then fled the scene and was pursued by police into neighboring Ventura, where he fatally shot Oxnard police Sergeant James O'Brien. Winterbourne was subsequently killed by police outside another EDD office in Ventura.

The incident was the first mass shooting in Ventura County history and remained its deadliest for 25 years, until the Thousand Oaks shooting in 2018.

== Events ==
=== Prelude ===
On the morning of December 2, 1993, five days before a rescheduled job interview, Winterbourne had a brief phone call with his mother. Shortly afterward, he packed his accumulated rejection letters, a job contact notebook, and his Northrop unemployment documents into a manila envelope. He loaded his firearms into his vehicle and departed from his mother's home in Ventura, California.

At 11:15 a.m., Winterbourne entered the lobby of the Star-Free Press in Ventura. Described as a husky man standing six feet tall with long brown hair and a scraggly beard, he was dressed in a dark trench coat, gray slacks, a white shirt, and a clip-on tie. He asked to speak with opinion page editor Timm Herdt and handed him the manila envelope containing documents related to his employment history, job search, and appeal of the denial of unemployment benefits. The envelope contained two job performance reviews from Winterbourne's brief employment as a computer systems engineer at Northrop Corporation in 1986, a letter of resignation, a Department of Defense document concerning penalties for violating a security oath, a letter to his congressman alleging illegal activities at Northrop and threats against his life, and a transcript of an appeal of his denial of unemployment benefits. It also contained hundreds of job advertisements, applications, and rejection letters from nearly 300 companies, along with a notebook documenting more than 2,000 job contacts between February 14, 1986, and December 2, 1993. Winterbourne told Herdt to look over the documents at his leisure and said that he would call later to discuss them. After thanking Herdt, he left the building. Herdt set the envelope aside without opening it and returned to work.

=== EDD shooting ===
Winterbourne then drove approximately ten minutes south to neighboring Oxnard and parked his tan 1978 Dodge Aspen on a residential street near a state Employment Development Department (EDD) office, a facility he had visited as often as once a week. Approximately 50 clients, including mothers with young children, were waiting in the lobby. Although the office employed 35 people, about a dozen had called in sick that day and more were out of the office for various reasons, leaving a significantly reduced staff working behind the service counter. Police believed that Winterbourne walked past the office and entered the building from its far side through the parking lot. A witness outside observed him heading toward the entrance, noting that Winterbourne appeared to be "in a hurry." At 11:41 a.m., Winterbourne entered the EDD office through the east public entrance. Because he was such a frequent visitor to the office, EDD supervisor Bobbie Espinoza instantly recognized his long hair and beard as he walked inside. Without speaking, he approached the east end of the service counter and removed a 12-gauge Browning BPS pump-action shotgun from a long cardboard box. Winterbourne rested the weapon on the counter and fired his initial shot into a surveillance camera, prompting many occupants in the lobby to immediately drop to the floor. He then turned the weapon toward the staff and began shooting.

Winterbourne directed his fire toward the employees behind the counter and did not fire at the clients in the lobby. Espinoza, standing approximately ten feet away when she spotted the shotgun, immediately took cover beneath her desk and was not injured. Forty-three-year-old EDD clerk Phillip Villegas was shot in the back and killed as he turned to flee, making him the first victim to fall. As Villegas collapsed, occupants began shouting for others to get down, and clients and employees scrambled for cover. Employee Carol Wilson, who had just left the service counter, dove to the floor as coworkers near her fell from the gunfire. She crawled to a back room and dialed 911. As 41-year-old employee Catherine Ann Stinson turned to her right, another shot struck her computer terminal, causing it to explode. Immediately afterward, Winterbourne shot 65-year-old Richard Bateman, a retired businessman working as a job counselor for an organization that assisted people with disabilities. Bateman had originally been sitting in a client's chair at a desk, with his back toward the counter, when Winterbourne shot him in the right arm and continued walking down the aisle. Bateman stood up crying loudly, which witnesses noted appeared to anger the assailant. Winterbourne returned and shot him twice in the upper body, killing him; Bateman fell to the floor in convulsions. Witnessing the monitor explode and Bateman collapse, 51-year-old employee Bonnie Smith was then shot in the hip; she subsequently crawled to a storage area to hide.

Winterbourne then kicked open the swinging door at the front counter and entered the employee work area. While some employees hid in a janitor's closet and a bathroom, others hid beneath their desks. He moved through the area, firing and reloading his shotgun. Winterbourne then aimed at 59-year-old employee Cathie Jimenez, who was huddled under her desk behind a chair, and pulled the trigger. The weapon merely clicked because it had run out of ammunition. Jimenez began loudly praying Hail Marys. As Jimenez called 911, Winterbourne searched the pockets of his trench coat and reloaded the weapon. Distracted by the sound of 42-year-old Anna Velasco crying, he walked over to her adjacent desk. He shot Velasco in the hip, then fired a second round into her chest at close range.

As Stinson huddled beneath the counter, she observed Winterbourne turn abruptly and stalk toward 47-year-old EDD supervisor Irma Lopez, the wife of Oxnard Mayor Manuel Lopez. Lopez crawled under desks and moved telephone wires aside, attempting to remain silent as she navigated toward an employee entrance approximately 50 feet away. She hit the exit door with enough force to cut herself. She and Winterbourne made eye contact before he fired at her twice with his shotgun, striking her in the back and legs with buckshot. The blasts propelled her forward, leaving her collapsed with her legs propping open the doorway. Unaware of the extent of her injuries, Lopez saw people running away and began dragging herself toward the parking lot.

Ray Gonzales, a 36-year-old insurance salesman from Port Hueneme, was leaving his office at Prudential Insurance next door for lunch when he saw people running and screaming in his pickup truck's rearview mirror. Hearing the gunfire, Gonzales made a U-turn and slowly backed up to the curbside, stopping just five yards from the employee entrance, where he spotted Lopez collapsed and propping open the door. Looking past her into the building, he observed Winterbourne taking slow "baby steps," appearing calm and in a daze as he racked another shell into his shotgun. Fearing Winterbourne was about to shoot Lopez again, Gonzales shouted at her to get into his truck. After she attempted to stand and fell multiple times, she dragged herself within his reach. Gonzales grabbed her under the arms, yanked her into the cab, and pushed her onto the floorboard. He sped away as Winterbourne fired another blast toward the truck, transporting her to St. John's Regional Medical Center.

Winterbourne then climbed onto the front counter. Standing above Stinson's desk, he fumbled with his shotgun as it jammed, eventually abandoning it to retrieve a Smith & Wesson Model 29 .44 Magnum revolver from a holster beneath his coat. Stinson, already suffering from a gunshot wound to her left shoulder received earlier in the rampage, crouched beneath the counter and watched as Winterbourne dropped his empty firearm to switch weapons. As she prayed, Winterbourne looked down and fired four times into her right leg, before also shooting 40-year-old worker Darlene Provencio in the hip, upper back, and right arm as she threw her body over an injured colleague. He subsequently fired four more shots into Stinson's left leg. Two workers attempted to position themselves behind Winterbourne to subdue him, but the rapid pace of the attack prevented them from taking action. Extra ammunition fell from his pockets as he moved through the office. Winterbourne ceased firing and vaulted over the four-foot-high service counter. He tucked the revolver into his waistband, straightened his jacket, and exited through the north door.

=== Pursuit and killing of James O'Brien ===
Outside the EDD office, two women pointed out Winterbourne, who was standing at the other end of the building, to responding Oxnard police officer Joe Marino. Although Winterbourne initially appeared unarmed, he and Marino made eye contact before Winterbourne fled on foot. Drawing his .44 Magnum revolver, he took cover in a nearby walkway. As Marino and two other officers pursued him through the breezeway, Winterbourne took cover behind his car, propped his gun on the roof, and exchanged gunfire with the officers. The officers dropped to the ground and returned fire. One officer shot through the windshield of Winterbourne's vehicle, striking him twice, once in the left shoulder and once in the lung. Police later stated that internal bleeding from these wounds would eventually have been fatal. Despite his injuries, Winterbourne got into his Dodge Aspen and fled. An officer briefly chased the fleeing vehicle on foot, anticipating that Winterbourne might crash, but he successfully drove away, initiating a high-speed pursuit involving multiple patrol cars at speeds exceeding 100 mph (160 km/h).

The pursuit halted a few minutes later when Winterbourne encountered backed-up traffic at an intersection in Ventura. He braked suddenly, causing the Dodge to slide to a stop diagonally across the lanes. He then exited the vehicle, braced himself behind the driver's-side door with a scoped .300 Winchester Magnum Browning A-Bolt bolt-action rifle, and fired two shots. Oxnard police Sergeant James O'Brien, 35, was approximately 200 feet (61 m) away, taking cover behind the open door of his unmarked police vehicle. Winterbourne's first shot struck a police car spotlight before deflecting and hitting O'Brien in the head, killing him instantly. After O'Brien fell, Winterbourne fired another shot before getting back into his vehicle and driving away. Because civilian motorists were present, officers did not return fire. Winterbourne continued toward Ventura with police in pursuit.

=== Final confrontation ===
Approximately one minute later, at 11:54 a.m., the pursuit ended in the parking lot of the Ventura EDD office. Winterbourne, coughing up blood from the wounds he had sustained during the earlier exchange of gunfire, threw open his car door and emerged cradling a .223 Remington Ruger Mini-14 semi-automatic rifle. The rifle had one round chambered and 29 additional rounds in its magazine, and its safety was disengaged. He moved toward the office, where approximately 36 people were working. Six police officers opened fire when Winterbourne was approximately 40 feet (12 m) from the entrance. One officer ran toward him before stopping to fire, while another fired through the windshield of his police vehicle. During the gunfire, 27-year-old bystander Nick Baker was slightly wounded by police as he ducked for cover outside the office. The wound required no medical treatment. Nearby, 44-year-old James Papas ducked for cover inside his white 1982 Datsun truck approximately 45 feet from Winterbourne. Eight errant bullets fired by Oxnard police pierced the truck, but Papas emerged unscathed. Winterbourne was struck nine times during the final volley, in addition to the two wounds he had sustained earlier. He sustained 11 gunshot wounds in total, affecting his head, chest, neck, shoulder, arm, leg, and foot. Officers kicked the rifle away from Winterbourne and handcuffed him. He was pronounced dead at the scene. The entire rampage lasted approximately 13 minutes.

== Victims ==
Four people were killed during the rampage. Two victims were pronounced dead at the Oxnard EDD office, while a third was taken to St. John's Regional Medical Center in Oxnard, where she died. The fourth victim, a pursuing police officer, was killed instantly during the subsequent pursuit into Ventura. Autopsies performed on the deceased revealed a total of seven gunshot wounds: Richard Bateman was shot three times, Anna Velasco twice, and Phillip Villegas and James O'Brien once each. Four others were injured during the initial attack at the unemployment office, sustaining a total of 15 gunshot wounds: Catherine Stinson was shot nine times, Darlene Provencio three times, Irma Lopez twice, and Bonnie Smith once. Additionally, one bystander was slightly wounded by police during the final confrontation.

=== Killed ===
- James E. O'Brien, 35, of Camarillo, California.
- Phillip Villegas, 43, of Oxnard, California.
- Richard M. Bateman, 65, of Ventura, California.
- Anna Velasco, 42, of Fillmore, California.

=== Injured ===
- Irma Lopez, 47, of Oxnard, California.
- Catherine Ann Stinson, 41, Port Hueneme, California.
- Darlene Provencio, 40, of Oxnard, California.
- Bonnie Smith, 51, of Camarillo, California.

== Perpetrator ==
Winterbourne in 1990

Alan Douglas Winterbourne (March 7, 1960 – December 2, 1993) was born in Ventura, California, to William Boyd Winterbourne (1921–1984) and his wife Ila Mae Winterbourne (née Grove; 1924–2010), who had married in 1950. Described as a shy and sensitive child, he was the second of two children raised in a Lutheran household. At the age of ten, he began investing his allowance in the stock market with the stated goal of eventually becoming a philanthropist. He attended Blanche Reynolds and Cabrillo Middle schools before graduating from Ventura High School in 1978. While his father taught ceramics at a local college and his mother managed the Ventura County Symphony, Winterbourne gravitated toward technology and ham radio. In 1978, he enrolled at California Polytechnic State University in San Luis Obispo, eventually switching his major from engineering to computer science. Winterbourne struggled academically, maintaining a C average and repeating failed courses due to unacknowledged dyslexia, though he found some success working summer jobs on environmental projects for the Navy. In July 1984, his father committed suicide by drinking toxic pottery glaze over fears of losing his teaching position. Winterbourne eventually graduated in 1985 after seven years of study.

In September 1985, Winterbourne secured a position as a computer systems engineer at Northrop Corporation's Ventura Division in Newbury Park. His tenure was brief; he resigned on February 14, 1986, citing an inability to adapt to a change in assignment. When he applied for state unemployment benefits six months later, Northrop contested the claim, arguing that he had left voluntarily. In a December 1986 appeal hearing, Winterbourne argued that he had quit for good cause because he feared for his personal safety. The Employment Development Department (EDD) upheld Northrop's position and formally denied his claim, initiating a seven-year grievance against both the company and the state agency. His personal struggles were compounded in May 1987 when Linda Dong, a 25-year-old woman he had grown close to after college, committed suicide by shooting herself. Winterbourne kept his grief private but visited her grave twice a year and carried her photograph in his wallet for the rest of his life.

This marked the beginning of a seven-year period of chronic unemployment. Winterbourne meticulously maintained a three-ring notebook logging over 2,000 job contacts between February 1986 and December 1993, inscribing the goal "At least 1 contact a day 5 days a week" on its cover. He registered for several local job-training programs in the late 1980s, but interviewers routinely found his demeanor eccentric and unprofessional. Stymied in engineering, he unsuccessfully applied for roles as a technical writer, telephone line installer, and park ranger. He failed written exams for the California Highway Patrol and airport security, and washed out of a brokerage training program after failing to sign a single client. On job applications, he listed Superior Court Judge Edwin Osborne as a personal reference.

In 1990, the 30-year-old Winterbourne mounted a campaign for the Republican congressional nomination against eight-term incumbent Representative Robert Lagomarsino. Despite his candidacy, Winterbourne openly praised Lagomarsino and stated he was running simply to ensure voters had a choice on the ballot. He avoided active campaigning, advertising, or seeking endorsements to prevent splitting the Republican party, and he candidly admitted he lacked the experience to be as effective a legislator as the incumbent. His only prior elected position was serving as the vice president of a university amateur radio club. Describing his political views as having "Libertarian tendencies," Winterbourne focused his platform on reducing the national budget deficit by eliminating farm subsidies and giving more legislative power to individual states. A central component of his platform was abolishing the national maximum speed limit. Winterbourne financed the run using his personal inheritance, though the mandatory $1,200 filing fee immediately pushed him over his intended $1,000 budget. Although he was not viewed as a serious contender, Winterbourne received 5,703 votes in the June primary, accounting for 11 percent of the total vote.

Throughout his unemployment, Winterbourne maintained a structured routine and was remembered by neighbors as a quiet, polite man who mowed an elderly neighbor's lawn. He attended Trinity Lutheran Church weekly with his mother, volunteered at a homeless shelter, and participated in an annual 100-mile charity bike ride. He supplemented his income slightly by trading stock options, a hobby he had held since childhood. However, as his unemployment stretched into the 1990s, his financial situation severely deteriorated. He exhausted a $10,000 inheritance, became increasingly reliant on credit card cash advances, and lived reclusively. He was a frequent visitor at the Oxnard EDD office, visiting as often as once a week to utilize its job-referral services. Staff members noted that he was quiet and reserved, though he frequently offered excuses to decline job referrals. When an employee suggested that trimming his long hair and unkempt beard might improve his employment prospects, Winterbourne responded that he had already tried doing so without success.

By late 1993, Winterbourne was broke, deeply in debt, and exhibiting signs of severe depression. He had gained weight, stopped participating in his cycling events, and harbored growing resentment toward the state unemployment system and his former employers. In November 1993, his mother arranged a promising job interview for him with a military contractor. A critical second interview was scheduled for November 30 but was unexpectedly delayed until December 7 due to a death in the interviewer's family.

Following his death, no graveside memorial was held for Winterbourne; he was cremated and his ashes were scattered at sea off the Santa Barbara coast.
