= Browning Citori =

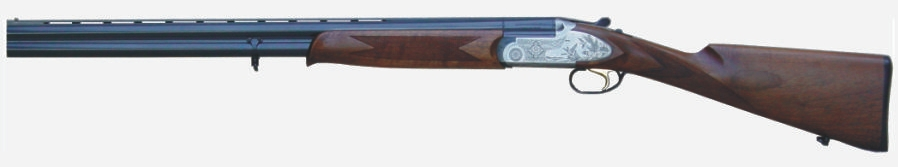
- Browning Citori 525
- Type: Double-barreled shotgun
- Place of origin: Japan

Production history
- Manufacturer: Miroku Corporation
- Produced: 1973–present

Specifications
- Barrel length: 24, 26, 28, 30, or 32 inches
- Caliber: 12, 16, 20, or 28 gauge or .410 bore
- Action: Break-action

The Browning Citori is an over-under double-barreled shotgun. It is marketed and distributed by the Browning Arms Company in Morgan, Utah, and manufactured for Browning by the Miroku Corporation in Nankoku, Japan.

The Citori is manufactured in a wide variety of models, styles, and gauges to accommodate enthusiasts of clay target games such as trap, skeet, and sporting clays, as well as upland bird and waterfowl hunters.

== Origin ==
The Browning Citori was introduced in 1973 as a more affordable version of the highly successful Browning Superposed. The Superposed, which was first sold in 1931, was the last completed firearm design by the famous small arms designer John Moses Browning.

In 1977, the Browning Arms Company was acquired as a subsidiary by the FN Herstal company of Herstal, Belgium, which continues to oversee operations today.

The name "Citori" has no meaning and is an advertising construct.

== Features ==
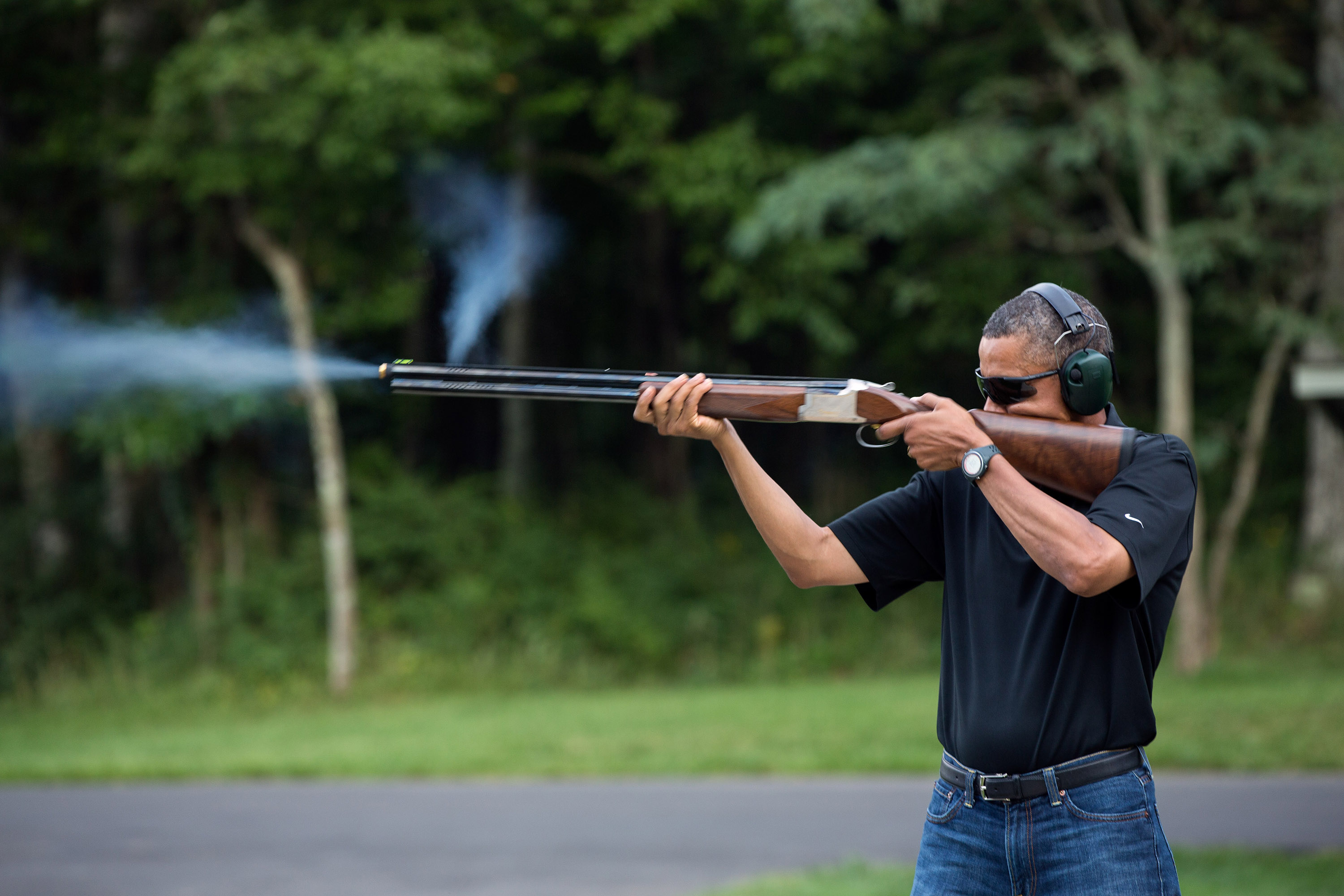
United States President Barack Obama firing a Browning Citori 525 on the range at Camp David. The side jet of smoke is from the ported barrel.

Browning Citoris come in all of the popular shotgun shell gauges, and are made in an over-under "stacked" barrel configuration, with forends and buttstocks made from high-quality walnut wood. Barrel lengths can be purchased from 26 inches (66 cm) for skeet shooting to 32 inches (81 cm) for sporting clays and trap shooting. The top barrel has a vented rib attached by soldering for the entire length of the barrel tube. Newer Citori internal barrels are chrome-lined for added surface strength. All metal parts are bright blued for the standard model. "In-the-white" higher grade models with more elaborate machine-applied engraving can also be purchased. Rubber recoil butt pads (12 gauge) or plastic butt plates (sub-gauges) are standard. Citori actions are made with internal hammers and coil springs and all Citori models have shell ejectors, which expel spent shells when the breech is opened by pressing aside the top lever and bending the action fully open, which also re-cocks the internal hammers.

The Browning Citori has a single, gold-plated trigger. A barrel selector mechanism is used to choose whether the top or bottom barrel fires first. The barrel selector is combined with the manual safety and is located at the top rear of the receiver, behind the top lever. If the first shot misfires and the gun does not recoil, the trigger can be reset to fire the second shot. This is accomplished by moving the safety/barrel selector back to the "safe" position and then forward to the "fire" position, without changing the barrel selection. Opening the action does not automatically engage the safety mechanism.

Current Citoris feature screw-in Invector choke tubes to regulate shot patterns downrange and thus provide versatility for usage in hunting and target shooting. These can be used with either lead, bismuth, or steel shot. Older models had factory fixed chokes, and steel shot is not recommended for use with those.

Some newer 12 gauge and 20 gauge Citori models have back-bored barrels. These are barrels with slightly larger bore diameters. Their purpose is to improve shot patterns by reducing the friction of the shot charge on the barrel wall, while also reducing felt recoil. Models with back-bored barrels use Invector Plus choke tubes.

== Sources ==
- Performance test of Browning Citori Lightning Field Grade, Ruger Red Label, and Beretta Silver Pigeon, Gun Tests, January 1997
- "Premier Competition STS Vs.Citori XS: We Prefer Browning", Gun Tests, August 2007
- Field test of Browning Citori 525, Outdoor Life, Summer 2002
- Bourjaily, Philip. "Shotguns: The Best Guns of the Year" (2002), Field & Stream
- Product review of Browning Citori Ultra XS Sporting, Shotgun Report, August 7, 2001
- Hawks, Chuck. "Browning Citori O/U Shotguns", chuckhawks.com
- "What is Back-Boring?", Browning Customer Services Top Questions
