= Browning X-Bolt =

X-Bolt Rifle
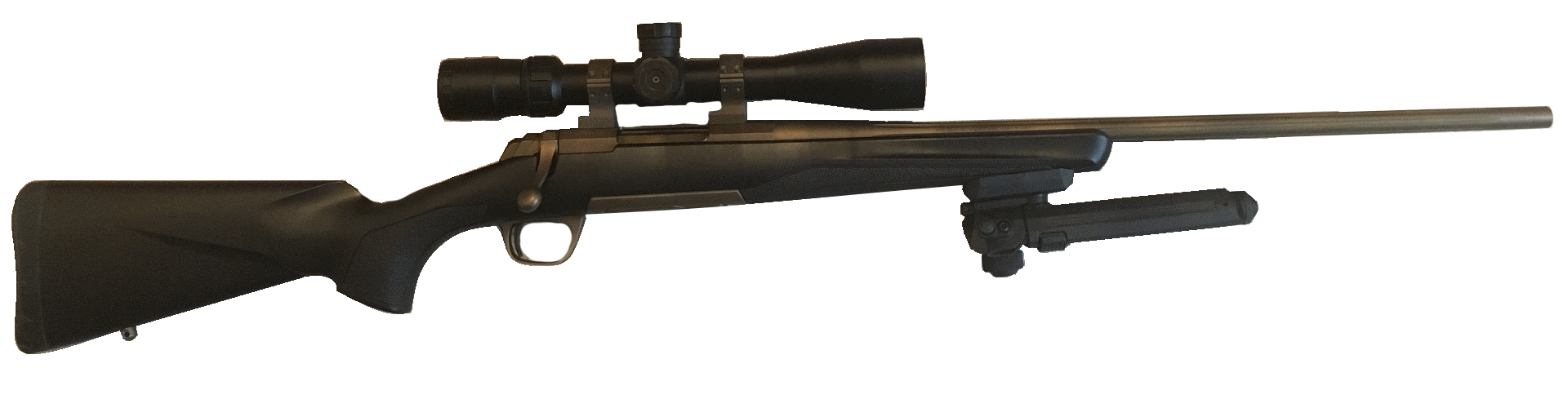
- Browning X-Bolt chambered in .308 Winchester with a Nikon scope and a Magpul Industries bipod.
- Type: Hunting bolt-action rifle
- Place of origin: United States/Japan

Production history
- Designer: Browning Arms Company
- Manufacturer: Miroku Corp.
- Produced: 2008-Present

Specifications
- Mass: Approx: 6 lb 11 oz (3.0 kg) (depending on variation)
- Barrel length: 20–26 in (510–660 mm)
- Cartridge: .223 Rem, .243 Win, .270 Win, 270 WSM, .300 Win Mag, 300 WSM, .308 Win, .375 H&H, 6.5 Creedmoor, 6.5 PRC, 6.8 Western, 7mm PRC, 7mm Remington Magnum other standard cartridges.
- Action: Bolt-action
- Effective firing range: 1000 m
- Feed system: 3 round, 4 round or 5 round detachable box magazine.

The X-Bolt Rifle is a bolt-action rifle designed by the American Browning Arms Company. It is manufactured by Miroku Corp. in Japan. In January 2024, the improved second generation X-Bolt 2 was released and production on the first generation ceased.

== Description ==
The X-Bolt rifle is a bolt-action rifle. Its name comes from the "X-Lock" scope mounting system. In addition, it uses the "X-Bolt Feather Trigger" which features an adjustable trigger pull.

== Variations ==
The X-Bolt rifle has many variations, yet most are small differences such as different barrel lengths and caliber.

- RMEF Special Hunter
- RMEF White Gold
- Composite 3D Birds Eye Maple Blued / Stainless
- Composite Stalker
- Eclipse Hunter
- Stalker Typhon Suppressor Ready
- High Grade Hunter Full Line Dealer
- Hunter
- Hunter Full Line Dealer
- Hunter, Left-Hand
- Long Range Hunter Carbon Fiber
- Long Range Hunter Realtree Max-1
- Medallion
- Medallion Maple
- Medallion, Left-Hand
- Micro Buckthom Pink
- Micro Hunter
- Micro Hunter, Left-Hand
- Micro Midas
- Mossy Oak Brush
- SSA Predator Hunter Mossy Oak Brush
- SSA Predator Hunter Realtree Max-1
- Stainless Stalker
- Stainless Stalker Carbon Fiber Fluted
- Stainless Stalker, Open Sights
- Varmint Stalker
- White Gold

== See also ==
- List of firearms
- List of rifle cartridges
