= UDX =

UDX may refer to:

- United Artists Records
- Universal Destinations & Experiences, theme park unit of NBCUniversal
- Utility Dog Excellent, a dog obedience title
- UDX Frame
- UDX Theater, venue for Seiyu Awards, Japan
- UDX, station code for Urdauli on List of railway stations in India
