= BUL Cherokee =

BUL Cherokee FS (Full-Size) / BUL G-Cherokee FS
- Type: Semi-automatic pistol
- Place of origin: Israel

Production history
- Designed: 1999 (2005 new/current frame design)
- Manufacturer: BUL Transmark
- Produced: 2000–present
- Variants: BUL Cherokee Compact; BUL G-Cherokee (full size & compact) with allows attachment of optional shoulder stock to backstrap.

Specifications
- Mass: 720g
- Length: 210mm / 215mm
- Barrel length: 111mm Barrel
- Width: 108mm
- Height: 140mm
- Cartridge: 9×19mm Parabellum
- Action: DA/SA short recoil, tilting barrel
- Rate of fire: semi-automatic
- Feed system: 17-round detachable box magazine
- Sights: Drift Adjustable 3-Dot Front blade, rear square notch (Night-Sights Optional)

BUL Cherokee Compact / BUL G-Cherokee Compact
- Type: Semi-automatic pistol
- Place of origin: Israel

Service history
- Used by: Israeli security agencies

Production history
- Designed: 1999 (2005 new/current frame design)
- Manufacturer: BUL Transmark
- Produced: 2000–present
- Variants: BUL G-Cherokee allows attachment of optional shoulder stock to backstrap.

Specifications
- Mass: 705g
- Length: 190m / 195mm
- Barrel length: 93mm Barrel
- Width: 93mm
- Height: 140mm
- Cartridge: 9×19mm Parabellum
- Action: short recoil, tilting barrel
- Rate of fire: DA/SA semi-automatic
- Feed system: 17-round detachable box magazine
- Sights: Drift Adjustable 3-Dot Front blade, rear square notch (Night-Sights Optional)

The BUL Cherokee is a polymer framed semi-automatic pistol made by Israeli firearms manufacturer BUL Transmark and is based on the Czech-designed CZ 75. It is the successor to the BUL Storm.

== Design ==
The Cherokee is equipped with a tactical rail (for lights, etc.), three-dot windage adjustable sights (night sights optional), and enlarged trigger guard, frame-mounted thumb safety and half-cock safety; no magazine safety.

The frame is an injected, fiber-reinforced polymer construction. The barrel and slide are forged 18CrMo4 and 34NiCrMo6, respectively. The new models have a natural grip angle (104 degrees).

The Cherokee is chambered only in the 9mm Parabellum (aka 9mm Luger or 9×19mm).

== Operators ==
- Israel: Israel Police
- Philippines: Philippine Army Special Operations Command with 1,000 units acquired through emergency procurement. Further procurement halted dues to issues of corruption in the Duterte administration.
