= Cynergy Shotgun =

Browning Cynergy
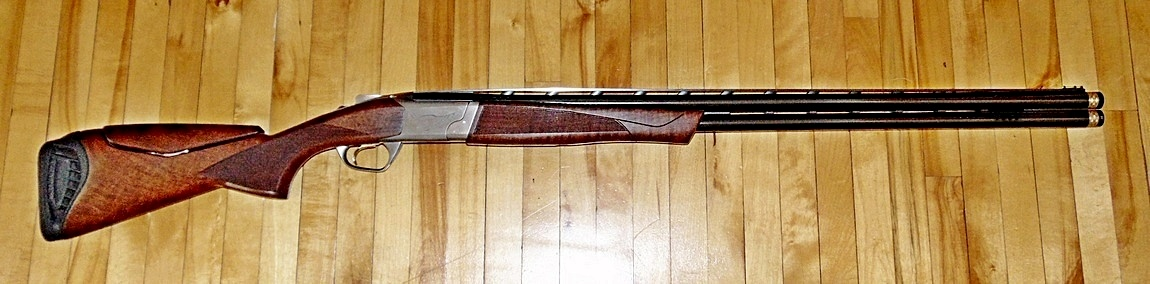
- Type: Double-barreled shotgun
- Place of origin: Japan/United States

Production history
- Designer: Browning Arms Company
- Manufacturer: Miroku Corporation
- Produced: since 2004

Specifications
- Action: Break action
- Rate of fire: variable
- Sights: iron sights

The Browning Cynergy is a range of over-and-under (double-barrel shotgun with their barrels attached vertically), double-barreled shotguns introduced in 2004 by Browning Arms Company. It is considered to be a major departure from the traditional design of over and under shotguns, which date back to the early 20th century.

The Cynergy is manufactured at the Miroku Firearms Manufacturing plant in Kochi, Japan. The Cynergy is substantially different in its design from Browning's previous Over and Under shotgun, the Superposed.

== Mechanism differences ==
=== Mechanical trigger ===
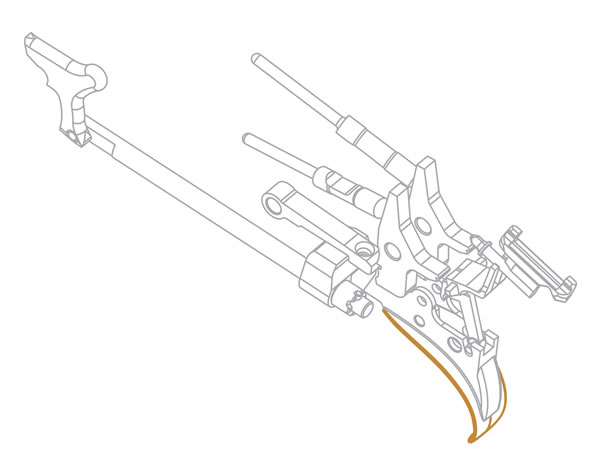
Mechanical trigger system

Based on the trigger system found in a rifle, Cynergy shotguns feature a reverse striker. The reverse striker is a mechanical trigger system that uses an actuator to reverse the direction of the impact force from the spring to the firing pin. Essentially, when the action opens up, the strikers must cock by a `pull' rather than a `push.'" This design offers the benefit of reduced locktime.

=== Monolock hinge ===
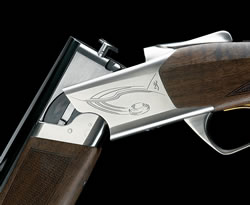
Side view of Monolock hinge system. Note large hinge radius.

The purpose of this design is to create a lower profile receiver. The system integrates the hinge and locking system. The MonoLock Hinge pivots on significantly more surface area than guns with conventional low profile receivers. Rectangular locking pins provide additional strength while a wear-in relief feature allows for wear without hindering lock-up.

== Sources ==
- Patent Storm
- Gun Week
- Shooting UK
- Browning, John M., American Gunmaker. Browning, John & Curt Gentry. 1964.
- "American Gunmaker: The John M. Browning Story." Documentary. Written and Produced by Lee B. Groberg
- Business Week
- Browning eBlast Newsletter, June, 2008. © Browning 2008, used with permission.
- Over-and-under shotgun apparatus and method. Joseph F.N. Rousseau, Mountain Green, Morgan County; Dwight M. Potter, Liberty, Weber County. Assigned to Browning Arms Co., Morgan. Filed Jan. 5, 2005, a continuation of Patent No. 6,907,687, filed Dec. 2, 2002. Patent No. 7,207,130.
