= Browning BSS =

- Type: Double barrel shotgun

Production history
- Designed: 1971
- Manufacturer: Browning Arms Company
- Produced: 1971–1983 (12 Gauge) 1972–1983 (20 Gauge) 1983–1987 (Sidelock)

Specifications
- Caliber: 12 Gauge
- Barrels: 2

The Browning BSS is a side by side double barrel shotgun made by Browning from 1971–1983.
