= Browning A-Bolt =

A-Bolt Rifle
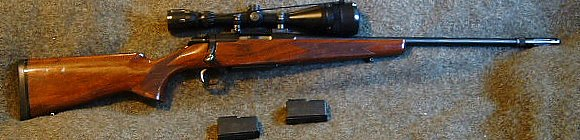
- Browning A-Bolt with scope, BOSS system, and various rifle magazines
- Type: Hunting bolt-action rifle
- Place of origin: United States/Japan

Production history
- Designer: Browning Arms Company
- Manufacturer: Miroku Corp.
- Produced: 1985–1994

Specifications
- Mass: Approx: 6 pounds 11 ounces (depending on variation)
- Barrel length: 22-28 inches.
- Cartridge: Winchester Short Magnum, .223 Remington, .22 Hornet, .375 H&H, other standard cartridges.
- Action: Bolt action
- Effective firing range: 1000 m
- Feed system: 3-, 4-, or 5-round detachable box magazine

The A-Bolt Rifle is a bolt-action rifle designed by the American Browning Arms Company. It is manufactured by Miroku Corp. in Japan. The A-Bolt replaced the Browning BBR in 1984. It is a popular hunting rifle due to its accuracy and availability.

== Description ==
The A-Bolt rifle is a bolt-action rifle with a short-lift bolt angle of 60 degrees. It uses a non-rotating bolt sleeve (partial sleeve on first generation A-bolt rifles). When the bolt is unlocked, smoothness is achieved with three guide ribs aligned with three locking lugs, enabling precise movement (only on the second and third generation A-bolt rifles). These three locking lugs also greatly increase bolt strength. The bolt's smoothness is also increased with a unique cartridge depressor; the cartridge depressor stays in place independent of the bolt's position. Near the end of the reloading cycle, when the bolt is re-inserted, the bolt moves gently over the cartridges in the magazine. The safety-catch is two-position, and is functioned using a thumb-slide on the action top-strap in the same manner as a shotgun. The barrel is free-floating and the recoil lug is glass bedded.

The A-Bolt rifle uses a detachable box magazine. Magazine capacity depends on caliber. Each A-bolt model chambers different calibres, with the Composite Stalker available for 18 calibres in the North America market alone. The available calibre also depends on the country where the rifle is distributed. See the Browning website in the country of choice for the list of available calibres according to the A-Bolt model.

== Variations ==
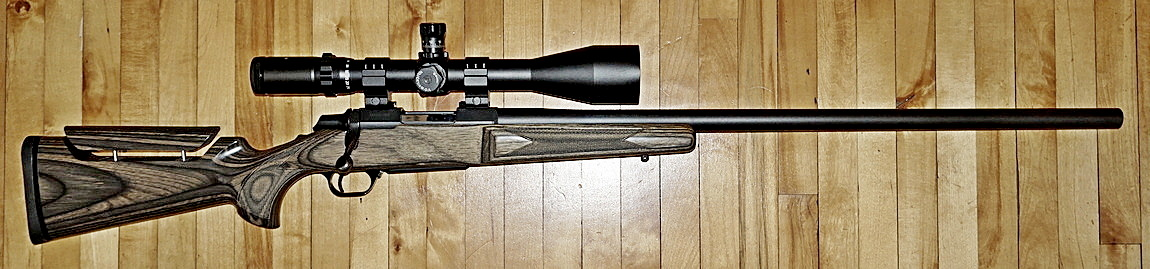
Browning A-Bolt Target .223 Rem with Millett scope

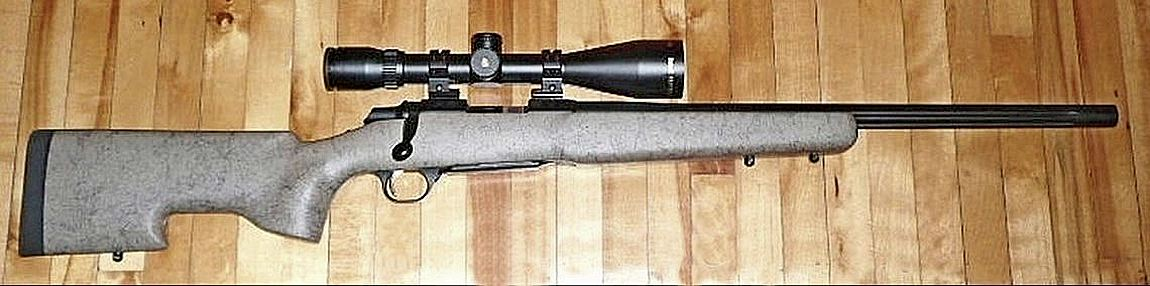
Browning A-Bolt TCT Varmint .308 Win with Bushnell scope

The A-Bolt rifle has many variations, yet most are small differences such as different barrel lengths and caliber.

- Composite Stalker Rifles
- Hunter Rifles
- Medallion Rifles
- Mountain Rifles
- Stainless M-1000 Eclipse Rifles
- Varmint Stalker Rifles
- White Gold Rifles
- Eclipse Hunter Rifles
- M-1000 Eclipse Rifles
- Micro Hunter Rifles
- NRA Wildlife Conservation Collection Rifles
- Stainless Stalker Rifles
- White Gold Medallion Rifles
- Long Range Hunter Rifles
- TCT Varmint Rifles
- Target Rifles

== See also ==
- List of firearms
- List of rifle cartridges
