= Browning Buck Mark =

Buck Mark
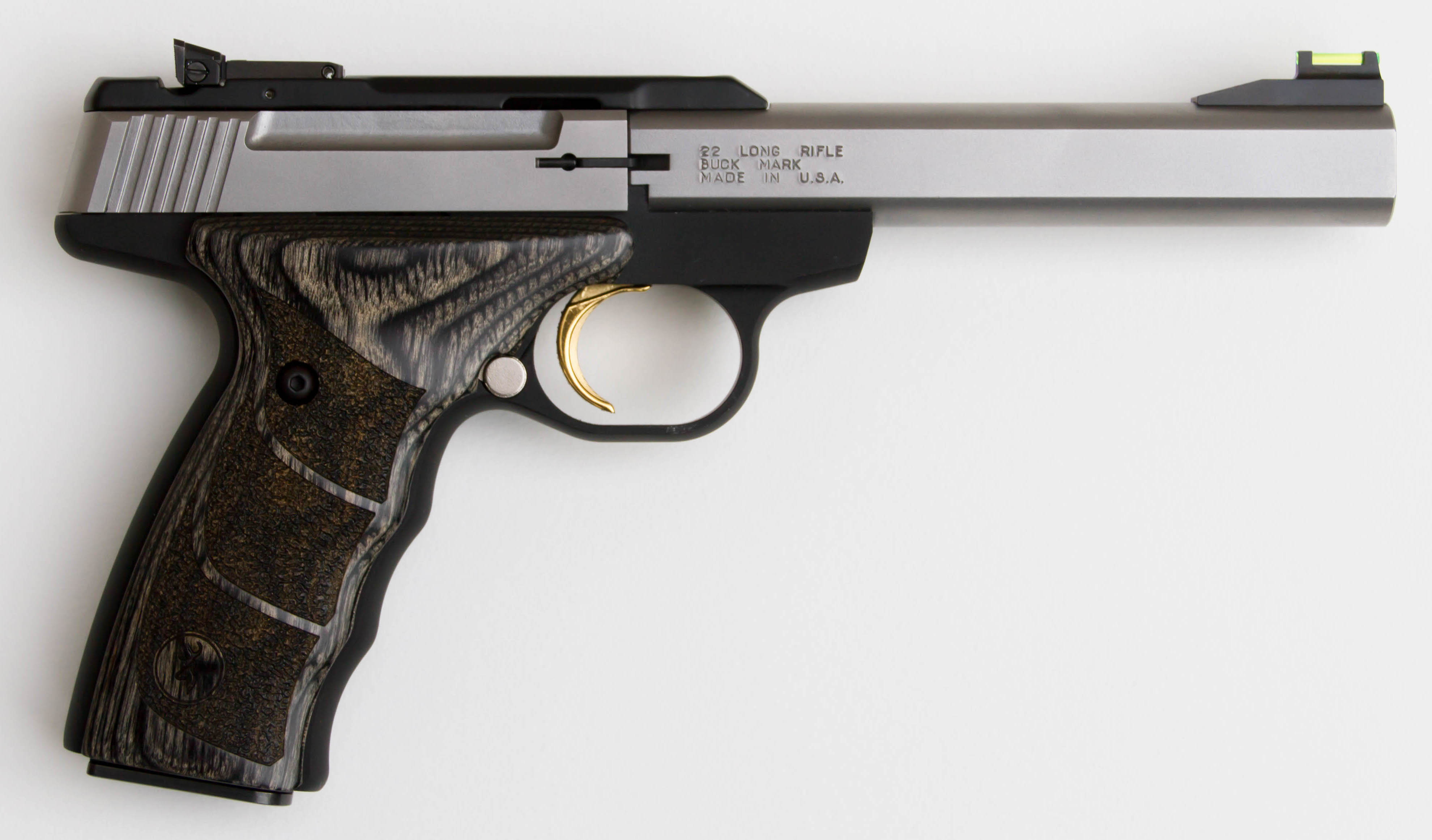
- Browning Buck Mark Plus UDX SS pistol
- Type: Semi-automatic pistol
- Place of origin: United States

Production history
- Designed: 1985
- Manufacturer: Browning Arms Company
- Produced: 1985-present

Specifications
- Mass: 964 g (34.0 oz)
- Length: 241 mm (9.5 in)
- Barrel length: 139.7 mm (5.50 in)
- Cartridge: .22 Long Rifle
- Caliber: .22
- Action: Blowback
- Feed system: 10 round box magazine
- Sights: Iron sights

The Browning Buck Mark is a semi-automatic pistol, made by the Browning Arms Company and chambered for the .22 Long Rifle cartridge. It has been produced since 1985. The Buck Mark replaced both the Challenger and International pistol models. The same action from the pistol is used in Buck Mark rifles.

== Design details ==
The Buck Mark pistol is designed with a straight blowback action, and is crafted using 7075 aluminium alloy. The gun uses .22 Long Rifle ammunition, with a magazine holding ten rounds. The gun comes equipped with a thumb safety as well as front and rear iron sights. Some also include a fiber-optic front sight for increased visibility. Features for some models include a bull barrel, full length scope rail, wooden comfort grips, and Pachmayr grips. It is typically issued with a ten-round magazine. As of 2019, there are 23 models offered of the Browning Buck Mark pistol, 10 of them are available in California.

== Models ==
=== UDX Frame ===
- Plus UDX
- Plus Rosewood UDX
- Plus Stainless UDX

=== URX Frame ===
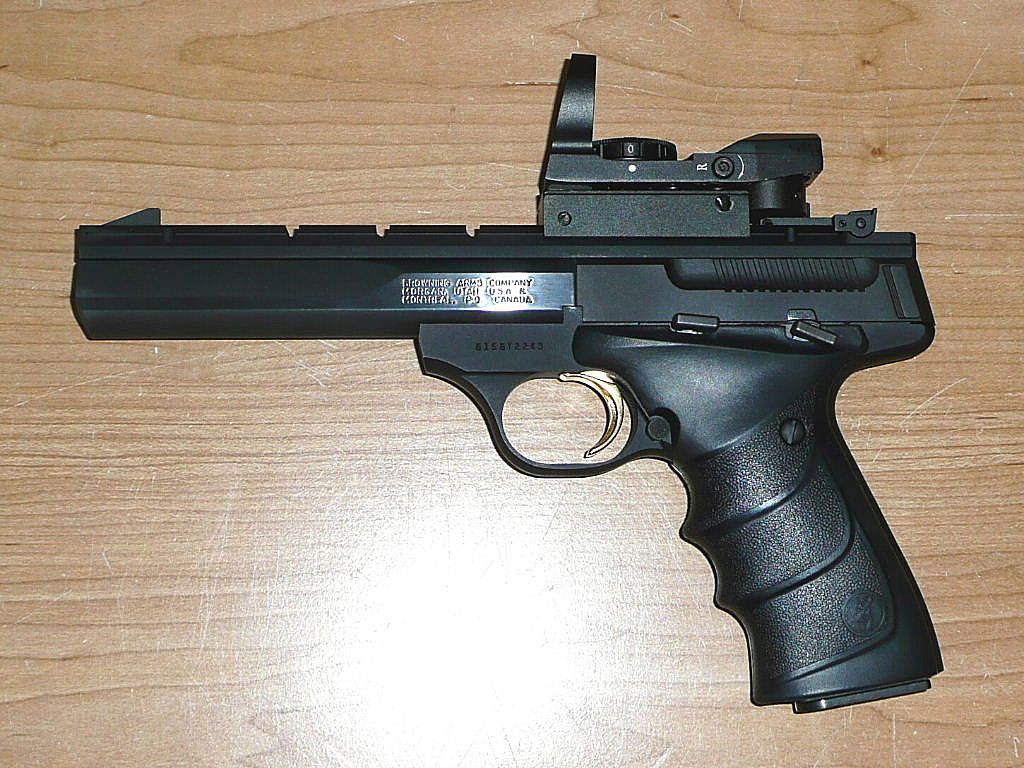
Browning Buck Mark Contour URX 5-1/2" barrel with Buck Mark Reflex Sight

- Camper Stainless URX
- Contour URX, 5-1/2"
- Contour URX, 7-1/4"
- Contour Stainless URX, 5-1/2"
- Contour Stainless URX, 7-1/4"
- Lite Gray URX 5-1/2"
- Lite Gray URX 7-1/4"
- Lite Green URX
- Practical URX
- Standard URX
- Standard Micro URX
- Standard Stainless URX

=== UFX Frame ===
UFX frame lacks finger grooves, unlike URX and UDX frames.

- Black Flute Lite
- Camper UFX
- Camper Stainless UFX
- Challenge Rosewood
- Field Target
- Field Target Suppressor Ready
- Hunter

=== Limited Availability Models ===
==== UDX Frame ====
- Black Label Carbon Fiber
- Black Label Carbon Fiber Pink

==== UFX Frame ====
- Black Lite
- Buckthorn Pink
- Buckthorn Tan
- Camper Mossy Oak Bottomlands
- Plus Fuchsia
- Plus Stainless Fuchsia

== Buck Mark Rifles ==
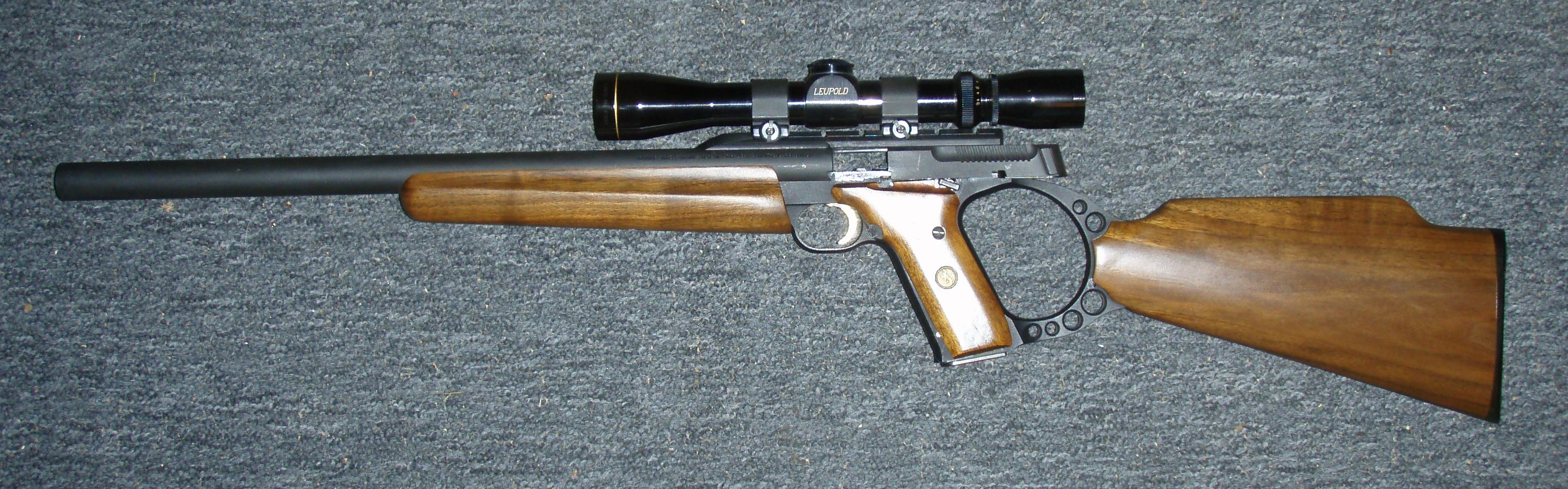
Browning Buck Mark Rifle

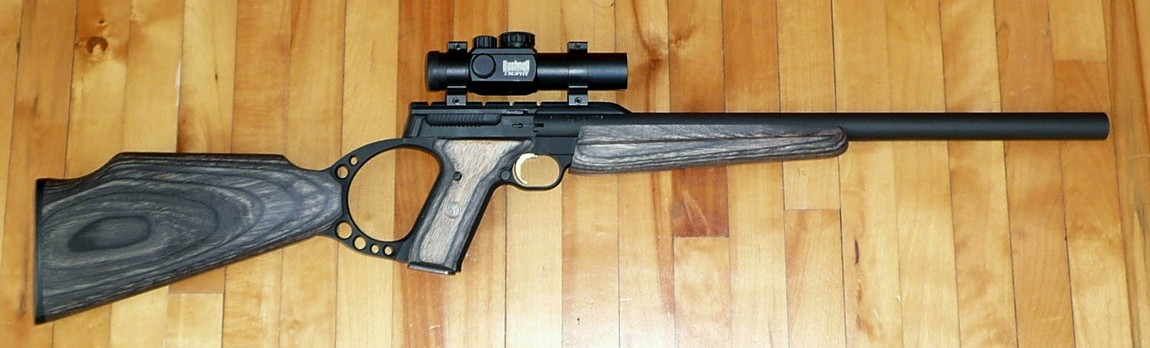
Browning Buck Mark Rifle FLD Target Gray Laminate with Bushnell red dot sight

The Browning Buck Mark Rifle is a rimfire rifle based on the Buck Mark pistol. It uses the same .22 Long Rifle ammunition and magazines as its pistol predecessor. All Buck Mark Rifles have 18" barrels.

=== Models ===
- Sporter Rifle
- Target Rifle
- FLD Target Gray Laminate Rifle
