= BUL Armory =

Israeli handgun manufacturer

Bul Armory
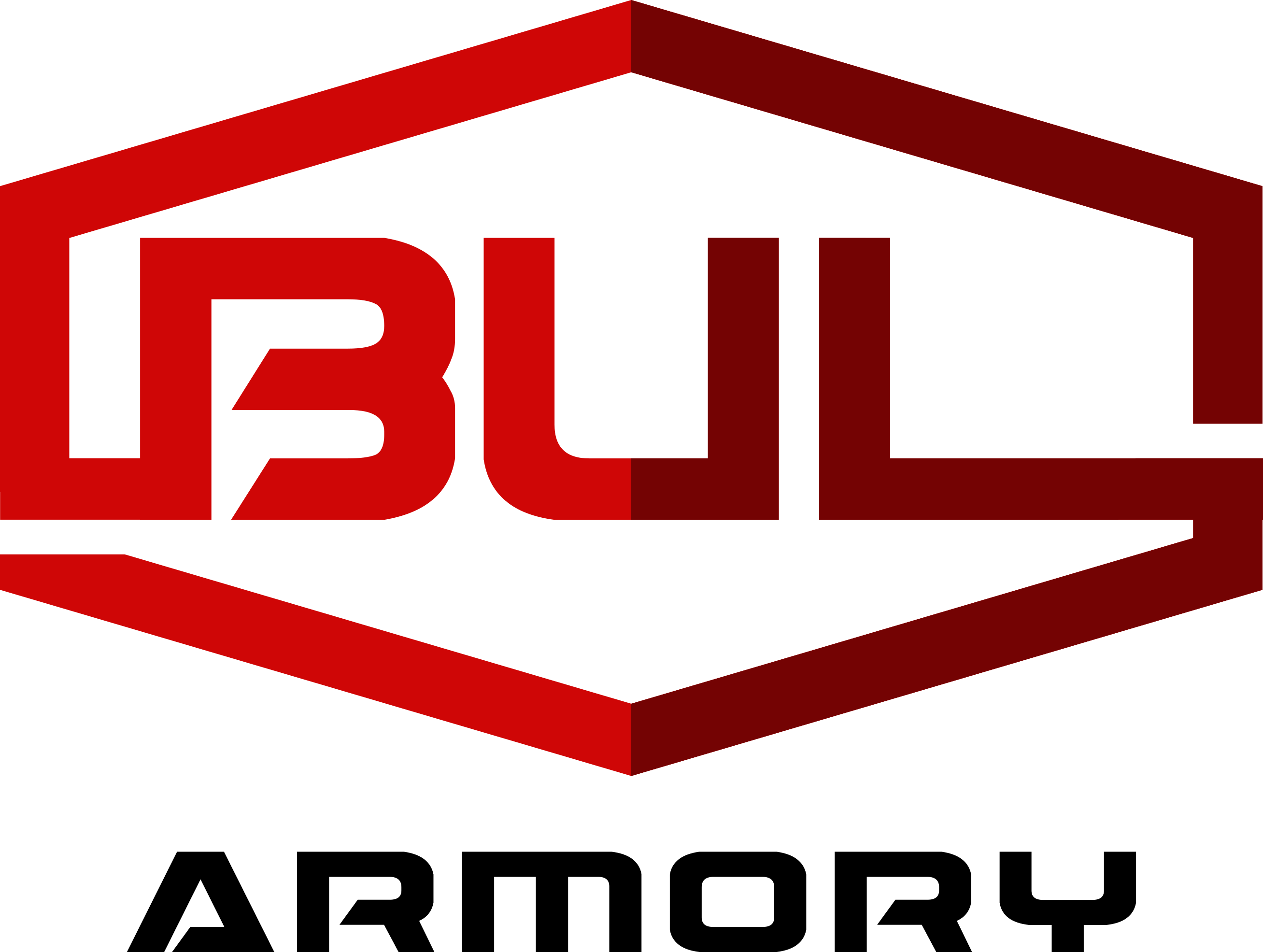
- Formerly: BUL Transmark
- Company type: Privately held company
- Industry: Firearms
- Founded: 1990; 36 years ago
- Headquarters: Israel
- Area served: Worldwide
- Key people: Zion Laniado, Eli Ozalvo.
- Products: Pistols
- Website: www.bularmory.com

BUL Armory is an Israeli firearms manufacturer of CZ 75, M1911, and AR15 clones designed for defensive carry, duty carry, and practical shooting sports.

== History ==
BUL was founded in 1990. It initially produced only a variant of the 1911 pistol (the BUL M-5). Later it began producing the BUL Storm and BUL Cherokee series of pistols, both CZ 75 variants. The Storm and Cherokee are chambered only in the 9mm Parabellum while the M-5 is chambered in 9mm Parabellum, 9x21, 9x23, .38 Super, .40 S&W, and .45 ACP.

== Models ==
- BUL 1911 Government
- BUL 1911 Commander
- BUL 1911 Trophy
- BUL 1911 Hunter 6
- BUL M-5
- BUL Cherokee
- BUL Storm
- BUL Classic G1911
- BUL Classic C1911
- BUL Classic U1911
- BUL SAS
- BUL SAS II
- BUL Axe

== See also ==
- Israel Weapon Industries
