= BUL Storm =

- Type: Semi-automatic pistol
- Place of origin: Israel

Production history
- Manufacturer: BUL Transmark

Specifications
- Mass: 989 g
- Length: 210 mm
- Barrel length: 111 mm
- Height: 140 mm
- Cartridge: 9×19mm Parabellum
- Action: DA/SA short recoil, tilting barrel
- Rate of fire: semi-automatic
- Feed system: 17+1-round detachable box magazine
- Sights: Drift Adjustable 3-Dot Front blade, rear square notch (Night-Sights Optional)

BUL Storm is a semi-automatic pistol made by Israeli firearms manufacturer BUL Transmark based on the Czech-designed CZ 75.

== Design ==
The Storm is Bul's first all-steel pistol.

The Storm comes in two versions: a carry / duty version with fixed sights, and a competition version with cocking serrations on its slide, a fiber optic front sight and adjustable notch rear sight.

The latter is optimized for the rules of the Production Division of IPSC practical shooting.
