= Jerry Fisk =

American bladesmith (born 1953)

- Born: 1953 (age 72–73); Eugene, Oregon, United States
- Occupations: Knifemaker, bladesmith

Jerry Fisk is an American bladesmith based in Nashville, Arkansas. Fisk was named a .National Living Treasure in 1998 by the University of North Carolina at Wilmington's Museum of World Cultures.

== Knifemaking and awards ==
Fisk began making knives in 1974 and became a Journeyman Smith through the American Bladesmith Society in 1987. Two years later he became the 17th Master Smith recognized by the ABS. Fisk has received Beretta's Outstanding Award for Achievement in Handcrafted Cutlery, the Bill Moran Award for the ABS 1990 Knife of the Year, the Arkansas Governor's Award and currently holds the title of National Living Treasure, the first knifemaker to receive this title. In 2016, the White River Sendero knife collection designed by Jerry Fisk was awarded the Sporting Classics Magazine 35th Anniversary Knife of the Year.

Fisk produces Bowie knives, hunting knives and daggers using mammoth bone, gold wire inlay and Damascus steel which he forges, himself.

Fisk has served on the governing board of the ABS, was inducted into the Bladesmith Hall of Fame, and developed the Bladesmithing School in Sao Paulo, Brazil.
