= Browning Arms Company =

American marketer of firearms and fishing gear

- Type: Subsidiary
- Industry: Firearms; Sports equipment
- Founded: 1878; 148 years ago in Ogden, Utah, United States
- Founder: John Browning; Matthew Browning
- Headquarters: Morgan, Utah, United States
- Products: Pistols; Shotguns; Rifles; Fishing rods; Fishing reels; Gun safes; Sport bows; Knives; Bicycles
- Parent: FN Browning Group
- Website: browning.com

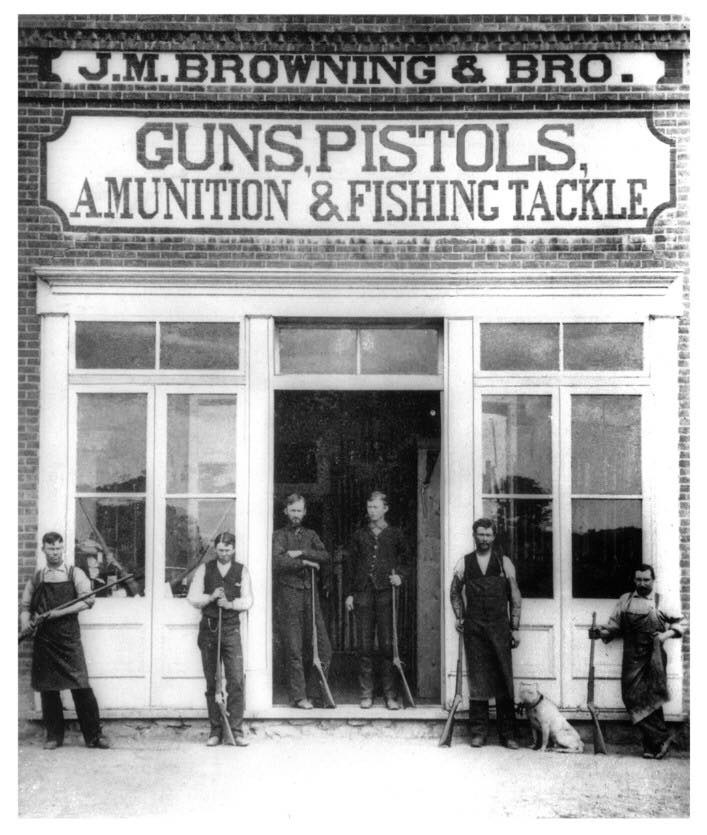
Browning Brothers gun shop, Ogden, Utah Territory, 1882. From left to right: Thomas Samuel Browning, George Emmett Browning, John Moses Browning, Matthew Sandefur Browning, Jonathan Edmund Browning, and Frank Rushton

Browning Arms Company (originally John Moses and Matthew Sandefur Browning Company) is an American marketer of firearms and fishing gear. The company was founded in Ogden, Utah, in 1878 by brothers John Moses Browning (1855–1926) and Matthew Sandefur Browning (1859–1923). The company offers a wide variety of firearms, including shotguns, rifles, and pistols. Other products include fishing rods and reels, gun safes, sport bows, knives and bicycles.

Initially, the company marketed the sporting (non-military) designs of John Browning, one of the world's most influential and prolific firearms inventors. Nearly all of John Browning's innovative designs have been manufactured under license by other companies, including Winchester, Colt, Remington, FN Herstal, and Miroku. Browning is currently a wholly owned subsidiary of FN Herstal.

Browning Arms Company is best known for the A-Bolt and X-Bolt bolt-action rifles, the BAR semi-automatic rifle, the BPR pump-action rifle, the BPS pump-action shotgun, the Auto-5 semi-automatic shotgun, and the Hi-Power pistol. Browning also manufactures a set of trap shotguns such as the 725 Pro Trap, Citori CX series, and the Cynergy series.

== Archives ==
The company's factory collection is owned by the Browning Firearms Museum at Union Station in Ogden, Utah.

== Products ==
=== Firearms ===
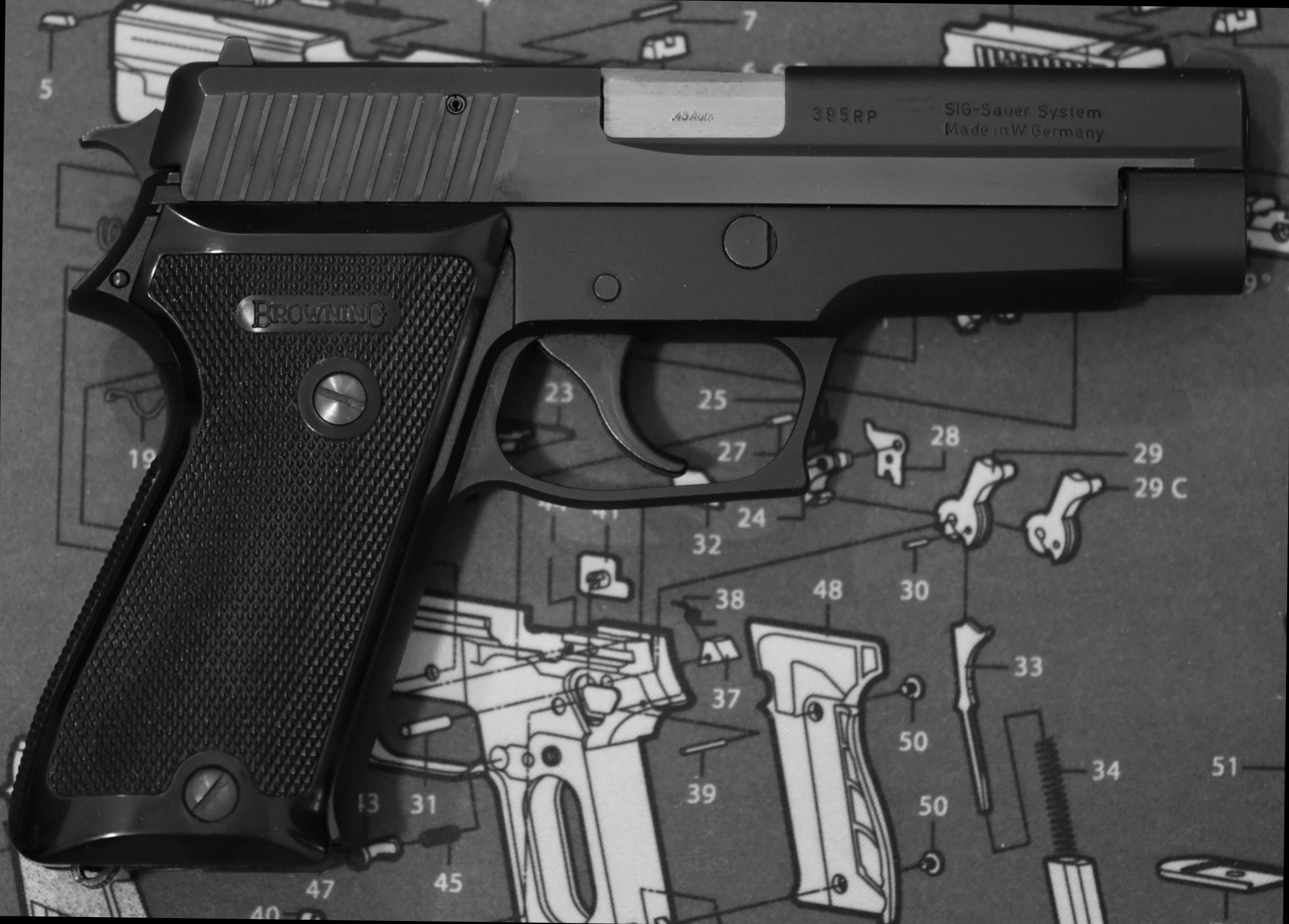
Browning BDA 45

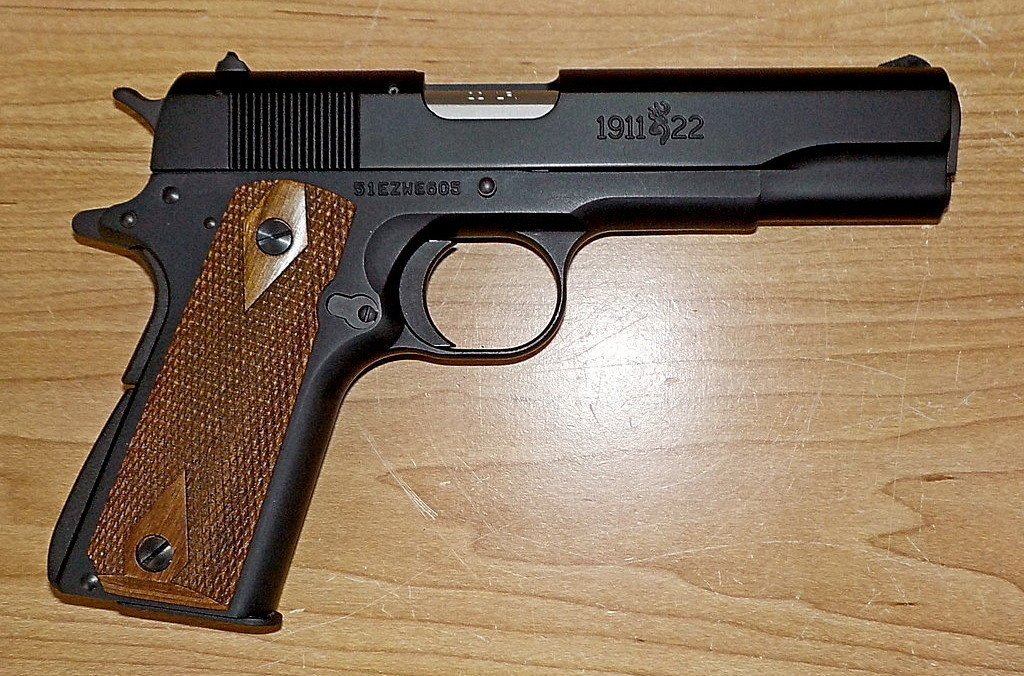
Browning 1911-22 A1

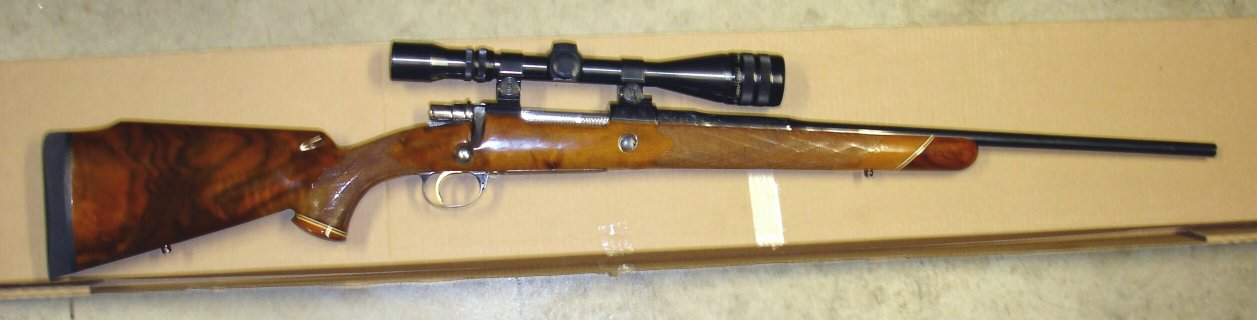
Browning Safari model made in Belgium in .270 Winchester

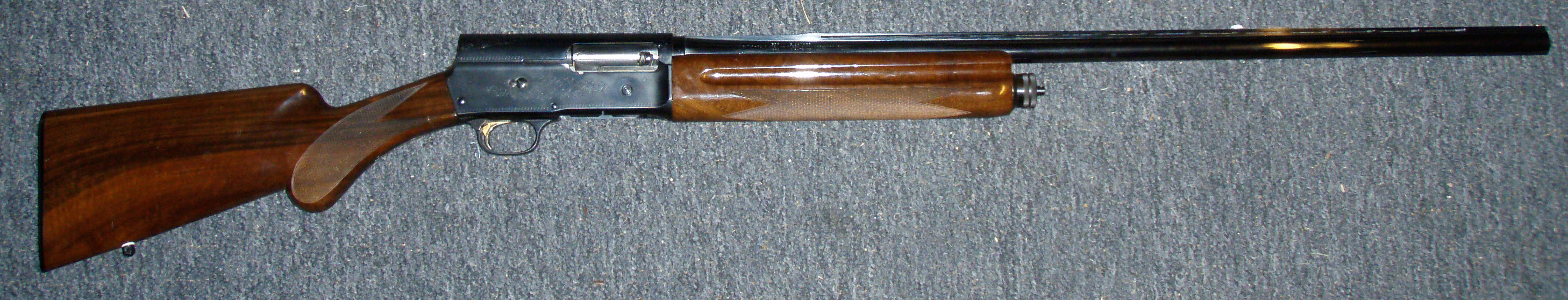
Browning Auto-5 20g Mag

==== Pistols ====
- Browning BDM
- Browning Hi-Power
- Browning Buck Mark
- Browning 1911-22
- Browning 1911-380
- Browning BDA 45 (SIG-Sauer P220)
- Browning BDA 380 (manufactured by Beretta)
- Browning BDA9 (FN HP-DA)

==== Rifles ====
- Browning X-Bolt
- Browning A-Bolt
- Browning BLR
- Browning Automatic Rifle
- Browning BPR
- Browning BBR
- Browning BL-22
- Browning Semi Auto 22 (SA-22)
- Browning T-Bolt in .22LR, .22 WMR and .17 HMR (introduced in 1965 and discontinued in 1975, reintroduced in 2006)
- Browning B-92 lever-action

==== Shotguns ====
- Browning A-Bolt Shotgun
- Browning Auto-5
- Browning A5
- Browning A5 20 gauge
- Browning B-2000
- Browning Silver
- Browning Maxus
- Browning Maxus 2
- Browning BPS
- Browning BSS
- Browning Cynergy
- Browning Citori
- Browning Double Automatic
- Browning Superposed
- BT-99
- BT-100
- Browning Recoilless
- Browning Gold
- B-80
- A-500
- Lightning

==== Machine guns ====
- M1895 Colt–Browning machine gun
- M1917 Browning machine gun
- M1919 Browning machine gun
- M1921 Browning machine gun
- M2 Browning machine gun

=== Footwear ===
Browning introduced a line of hunting boots in 1968 and continued to design and manufacture footwear through outside vendors until 2001. In that year, Browning reached a license agreement with Connecticut-based H.H. Brown Shoe Company, a subsidiary of Berkshire Hathaway, to manufacture Browning Footwear.

The product line included the John M. Browning collection, Field and Game series, and sporting and waterfowl lines. The line has grown to include kangaroo leather boots, rubber boots and waders, and upland game boots.

=== Knives ===
In 1968, Browning introduced a line of cutlery in the form of three fixed-blade hunting knives and a folding knife designed by the custom knifemaker Gil Hibben. Over the years, the lineup has grown, and Browning has teamed up with other knifemakers such as Jerry Fisk, Bailey Bradshaw, John Fitch, Joseph Keeslar, and James Crowell of the American Bladesmith Society. In 2004 Browning partnered with several custom knifemakers to produce a series of "Living History Knives" honoring famous American generals and battles. The lineup included a Liberty Tree Knife made by Larry Harley; a Robert E. Lee Knife and an Alamo Knife honoring Jim Bowie designed by Jerry Fisk; an Ike Knife honoring Dwight David Eisenhower designed by Jim Crowell; and a Crazy Horse Knife by Brent Evans. Browning has recently partnered with big-game hunter, Russ Kommer as their knife designer.

== In popular culture ==
Browning was the make of pistol initially depicted in the Nazi propaganda play Schlageter, from which the quote "when I hear the word culture, I reach for my gun", often associated with Nazi leaders, originates. The actual line from the play is slightly different: "Wenn ich Kultur höre ... entsichere ich meinen Browning!" "Whenever I hear of culture... I unlock my Browning!" (Act 1, Scene 1).

Browning is the sponsor of the hunting show Goin' Country hosted by Kristy Lee Cook, which the Versus channel aired before it became the NBC Sports Network. The relationship between Cook and Browning started after she wore a Browning hat on American Idol.

A Browning shotgun appears in the Turnpike Troubadours song "The Housefire" and "The Bird Hunters". The latter specifies that the gun was manufactured in Belgium.

== See also ==
- FN Model 1910 (designed by John Browning, built by FN)
- M1918 Browning Automatic Rifle
