= Miroku Corp. =

Japanese firearm manufacturer

Miroku Corp
- Industry: Arms industry
- Founded: February 1893; 133 years ago
- Headquarters: Nankoku, Japan
- Products: Shotguns, rifles
- Revenue: ▲3,907.4 million
- Operating income: ▲229.4 million
- Net income: ▲169 million
- Number of employees: 551
- Website: www.miroku-jp.com

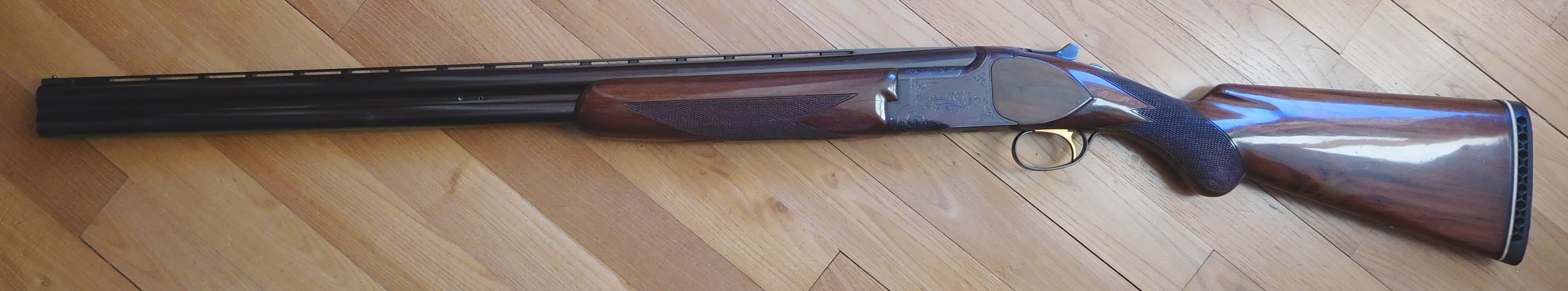
Miroku Model 3700.

Miroku Corporation (株式会社ミロク, Kabushiki Kaisha Miroku) (OSE: 7983) is a Japanese firearms manufacturer located in Nankoku, Kōchi Prefecture. Their products include shotguns produced for Browning Arms Company and rifles licensed by Winchester Firearms. In European markets, these products are sold under both the Miroku and Browning brand names.

Modern history of the company began in 1946 as harpoon cannon producer for the recovering Japanese whaling industry, expanding into firearms after the San Francisco Peace Treaty in 1951.

Charles Daly Firearms of the United States imported Miroku over/under shotguns throughout the 1960s to early 1970s. Afterwards, Miroku found a new outlet for the over/under models under Browning, explaining the similarities from late models imported by Daly to early Browning Citori Type 1 models. This also coincides with FN and Miroku's joint buyout of Brownings stock in 1977.

Miroku manufactured a few different models of handguns between the 1962 to 1968, though these were not widely distributed. Among the most common is the "Liberty Chief" model, .38 caliber revolver. They briefly manufactured copies of the Browning BL22, a .22 lever-action rifle, under the name of Miroku ML22. This model was popular with Australian rabbit hunters due to its low price and a high magazine capacity of 15 rounds.

Miroku's guns manufactured for Browning are sold in markets where Browning-branded counterparts are scant or unavailable. Miroku also produce, under license through Olin Corporation and Browning, the Winchester's famed lever-action and falling-block action rifles.

The company's flagship product, the MK38 Teague, has features such as a back-bored barrel and an extended choke associated with shotguns in the Browning and Beretta product lines. Miroku products are usually well-regarded by shooters for their quality fit and finish.

== See also ==
- Kawaguchiya Firearms Company
