= CAWS =

CAWS or Caws may refer to:

- Caws (surname), a list of people with the name
- Central aural warning system, a voice warning system on McDonnell Douglas aircraft and the Boeing 717
- Chicago Area Waterway System, administered by the Metropolitan Water Reclamation District of Greater Chicago
- Common Arrangement of Work Sections, a construction industry working convention in the UK
- Continuous Automatic Warning System, a cab signalling and train protection system used in Ireland
- AAI CAWS, a Close Assault Weapon System
- Heckler & Koch HK CAWS, a Close Assault Weapon System

== See also ==
- CAW (disambiguation)
- Cause
