= Smith & Wesson AS =

- Type: Automatic shotgun (AS-3) Semi-automatic shotgun (AS-1 and AS-2) Assault shotgun
- Place of origin: United States

Production history
- Designed: 1980s
- Manufacturer: Smith & Wesson
- Variants: AS-1 (Semi auto); AS-2 (Semi auto with burst); AS-3 (Burst with full auto)

Specifications
- Mass: 9.75 lb (4.42 kg)
- Barrel length: 18.0 in (457 mm)
- Cartridge: 12-gauge 12-gauge flechette
- Action: Short recoil
- Rate of fire: Semi (AS-1); Semi & 3 round burst (AS-2); 3 round burst & full automatic (375 rounds per minute) (AS-3)
- Effective firing range: 100 metres (330 ft)
- Feed system: 10-round box magazine
- Sights: Iron sights

The Smith & Wesson AS (Assault Shotgun) is a prototype 12-gauge select-fire shotgun manufactured by Smith & Wesson. Its layout is similar to the M16 rifle and fed from a 10-round magazine. The AS was a rival to the Heckler & Koch HK CAWS.

== See also ==
- AO-27 rifle
- Franchi SPAS-15
- Daewoo USAS-12
