= Automatic shotgun =

Automatic firearm that fires shotgun shells in fully automatic mode

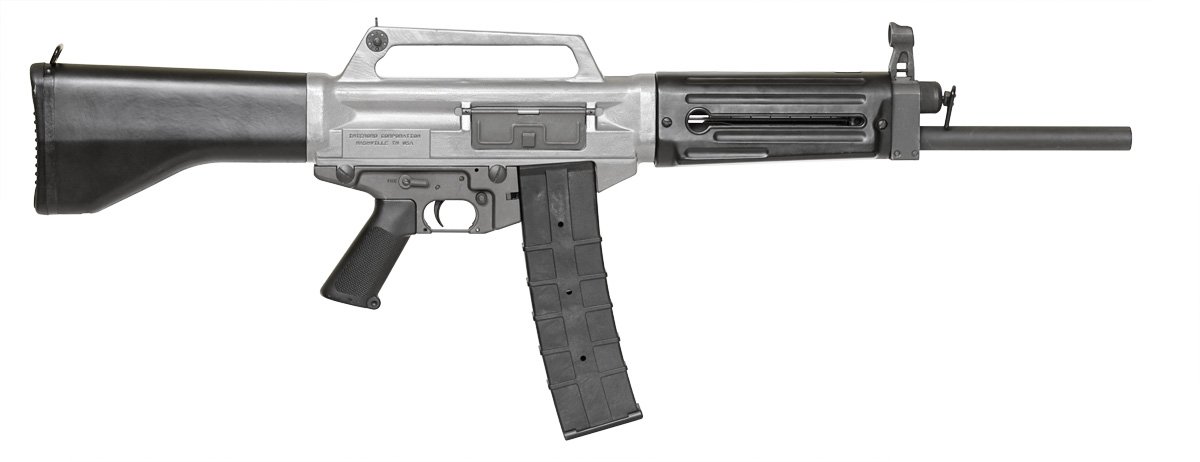
Daewoo USAS-12 automatic shotgun

An automatic shotgun is an automatic weapon which releases shotgun shells (thereby making it a shotgun) and uses some of the energy of each shot to automatically cycle the action and load a new round in fully automatic mode. It will fire repeatedly until the trigger is released or ammunition runs out. Automatic shotguns have a very limited range, but provide tremendous firepower at close range.

== Design ==
Automatic shotguns generally employ mechanisms very similar to other kinds of automatic weapons. There are several methods of operation, with the most common being gas, recoil, and blowback operated:

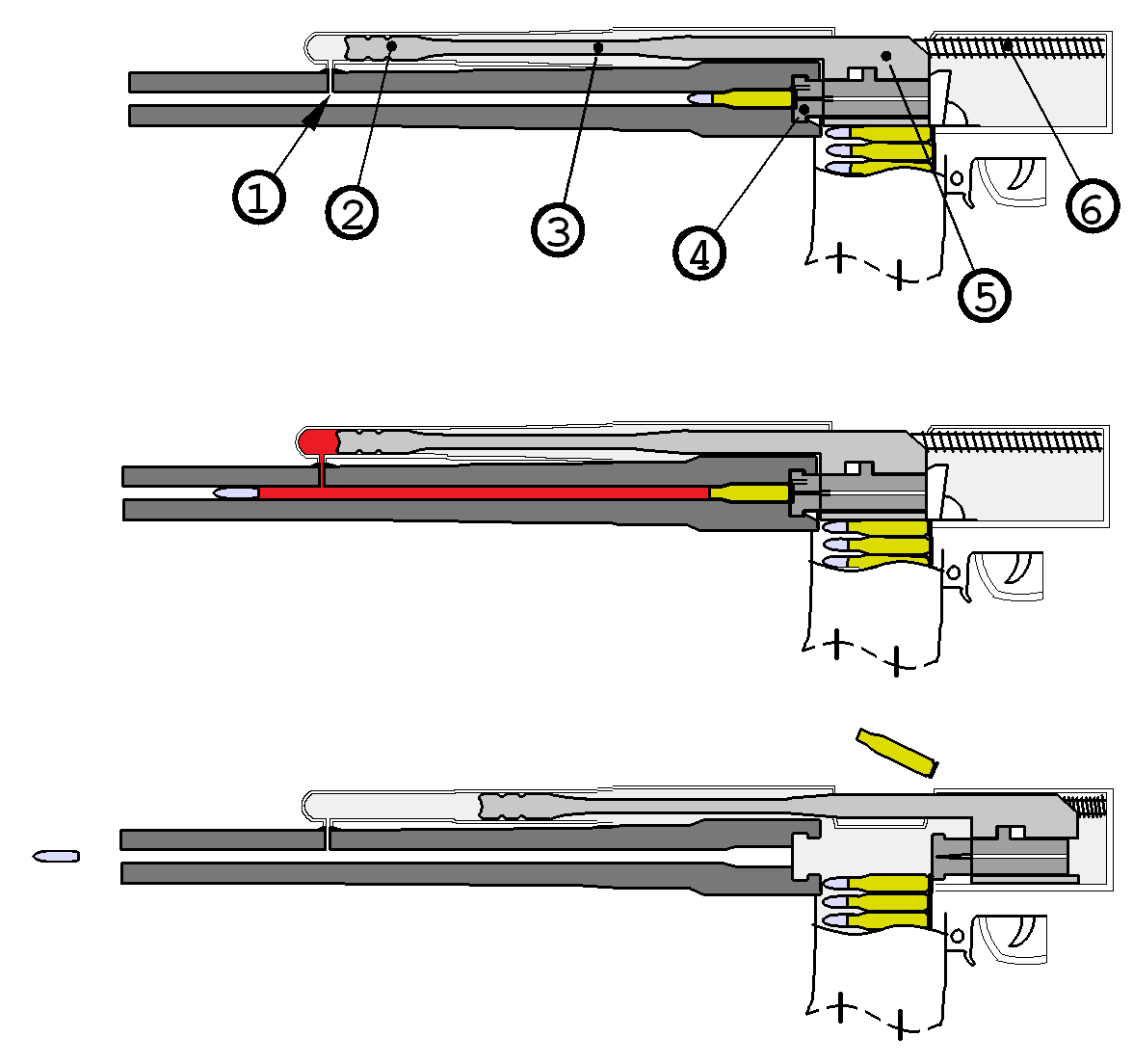
- Gas operated design
  Gas operation uses the pressure of the gas (created by the burning propellant) behind the projectile to unlock the bolt assembly and then move it rearward.
- Blowback operation uses the backward force applied by the projectile (due to Newton's third law of motion) to retract the bolt assembly.
- Recoil operation uses the backward force to retract the entire barrel and bolt assembly, which unlock at the rear of the barrel's path.

Each of these methods use springs to return the retracted parts to their forward positions and restart the cycle.

Many automatic shotguns are capable of selective fire, meaning they can fire in multiple modes (semi-automatic, burst, and sometimes fully automatic).

== Ammunition ==
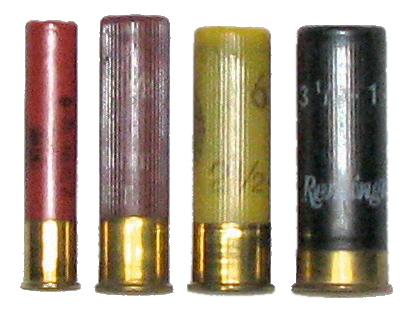
Shotgun shells

They generally store ammunition in detachable box or drum magazines in order to decrease reloading time, whereas most pump-action and semi-automatic shotguns use under-barrel tubular magazines.

Automatic shotgun ammunition choices are slightly limited because the fired shot must provide sufficient recoil energy to reliably cycle the action. This means they are not compatible for use with low powered rounds, e.g. less-than-lethal ammunition. The most common shotgun shell used in combat shotguns contains 00 buckshot, 8 to 10 lead balls, which is very effective against unarmored targets.

== Strengths and weaknesses ==
A standard shotgun shot fires multiple small projectiles at once, increasing the chances of hitting the target. Shotguns have a short effective range of about 50–70 metres (160–230 ft), but provide a lot of firepower at close range. Automatic fire enhances these effects, due to the increase in the rate of fire.

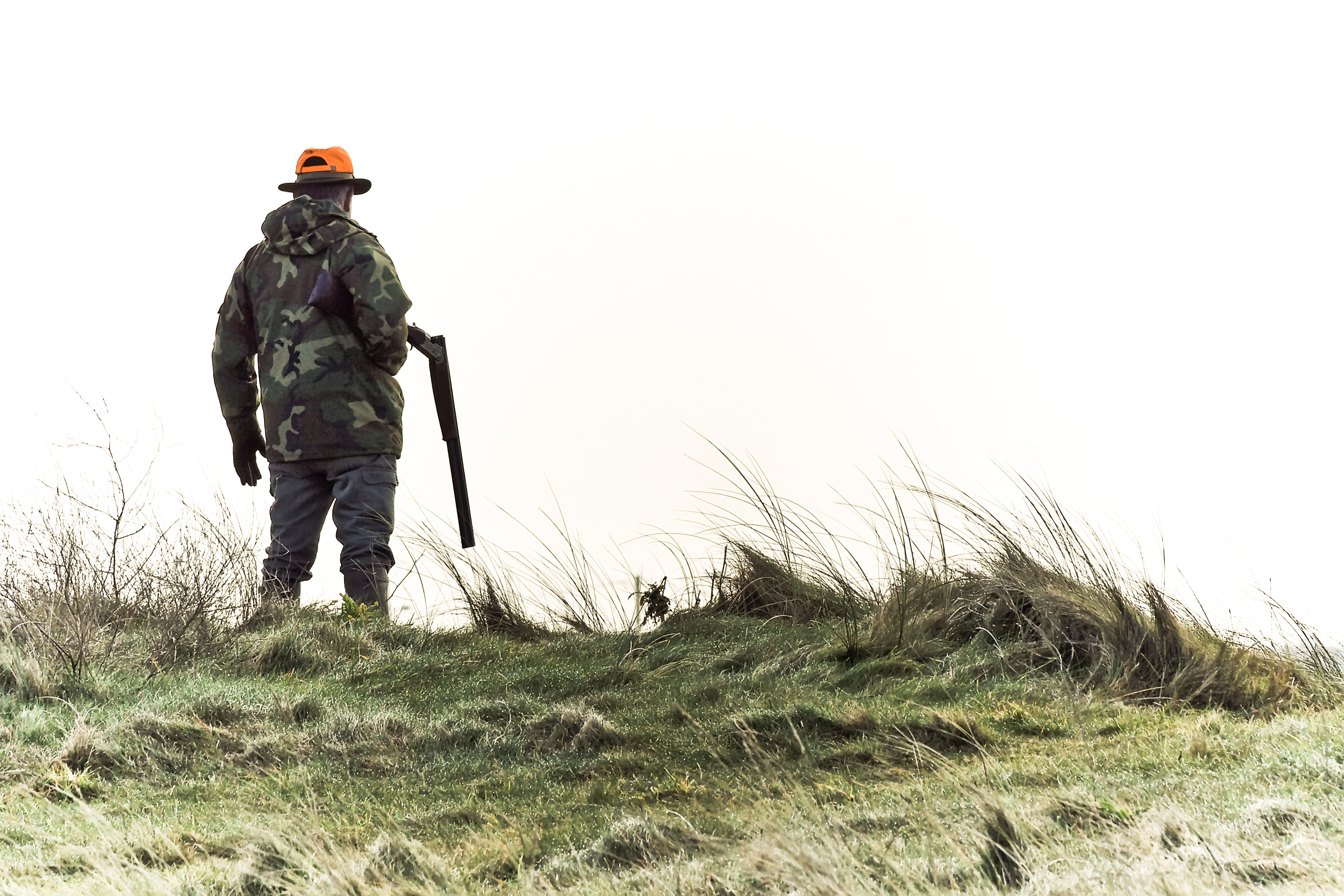
Long-barreled weapons are associated with precision activities such as hunting and shooting sports.

Automatics typically have much shorter barrels than pump-action shotguns (especially hunting shotguns). Short-barreled shotguns have a very high chance of hitting close range targets, and can even hit multiple targets in one area, which is ideal for close combat situations. Long-barreled pump action shotguns are more accurate and have increased range, which is ideal for hunting and sporting purposes.

Automatic shotguns are generally viewed as less reliable than manual operation shotguns, because there are more moving parts and increased chances of error. If any one piece fails, it will most likely halt the operation and cause damage to the weapon and/or user. Automatic weapons are also more susceptible to jamming and negative effects from dirtiness.

== Use ==
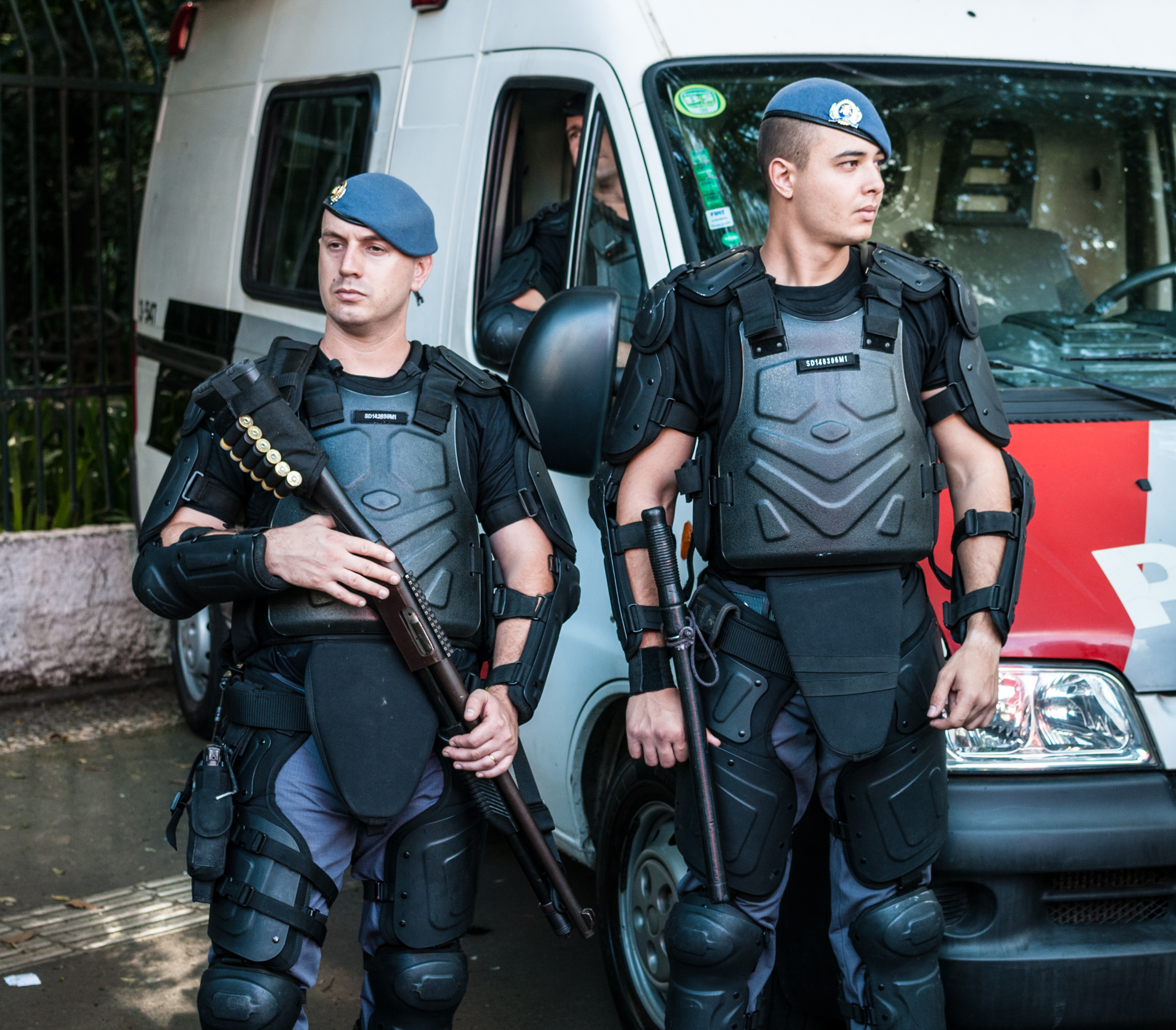
Brazilian Military Police equipped with their shotgun

Automatic shotguns are intended for use as military combat shotguns. They typically have a high rate of fire and relatively low recoil, making them ideal for engaging targets in a fast-paced, close range combat situation. They are able to fulfill many different combat roles due to the wide variety of shotgun ammunition available.

Automatic shotguns have not seen much use in the United States, but have been slightly more popular in some other countries.

== List ==
- AAI CAWS
- Atchisson AA-12
- Daewoo USAS-12
- FAS-173
- Gordon CSWS
- Heckler & Koch HK CAWS
- LW-3
- Pancor Jackhammer
- Saiga-12 (if converted to fully automatic fire)
- Smith & Wesson AS-3
- Remington 7188
- Vepr-12 (when converted to full auto)

== See also ==
- Combat shotgun
- List of combat shotguns
- List of shotguns
- Riot shotgun
- Semi-automatic shotgun
