= Fostech Origin 12 =

Semi-automatic magazine-fed combat/tactical shotgun

- Type: Semi-automatic shotgun
- Place of origin: United States

Production history
- Designer: Judd Foster
- Manufacturer: Fostech Outdoors
- Unit cost: $2,800 (MSRP)
- Produced: 2013–present

Specifications
- Mass: 9.2 lb (4.2 kg)
- Length: 35.2 in (89 cm)
- Barrel length: 9.75 in (24.8 cm); 18.5 in (47 cm)
- Height: 7 in (18 cm)
- Cartridge: 12 gauge (2 3/4-inch shells)
- Caliber: 12 gauge
- Action: Gas-operated, rotating bolt
- Feed system: 5-, 8- or 10-round box magazine 20- or 30-round drum magazine
- Sights: Flip-up iron sights

The Origin 12 is a semi-automatic magazine-fed combat shotgun, developed by Fostech Outdoors, which has a very high rate of fire.

Similar to the Saiga-12 and Vepr-12, the Origin 12 is primarily based on the AK action.

== Design ==
The Origin 12 is a semi-automatic shotgun derived partly from the Saiga-12 shotgun, which was itself derived from the AK. To improve user accuracy, the Origin features a large ejection port, and an adjustable gas system. The Origin uses proprietary magazines to ensure reliability, compared to the Saiga, whose magazines were described as its "weakest link." The Origin's receiver cover and forend are made from polymer, which helps to reduce weight. The Origin's upper receiver can be removed, allowing for switching between the regular and short-barrel variant. Both versions are compatible with a SilencerCo SALVO suppressor.

== Variants ==
- Origin 12 SBV (short-barreled variant) — A variant of the Origin 12, which ceased production in 2019, when the Bureau of Alcohol, Tobacco, Firearms and Explosives declared it a Title II weapon, making unregistered possession of the weapon a violation of the National Firearms Act (NFA). In response, Fostech allowed people who had purchased the SBV to send it to the company, and have it replaced either with the short-barrel or full-length Origin 12.
- Origin 12 short-barrel shotgun — A short-barrel variant of the Origin 12, with a 9.75 in (248 mm) barrel, and a side-folding stock, which when folded, gives the weapon a length similar to the Uzi.
- Origin 12 SABS (semi-automatic breaching shotgun) — A breacher variant of the Origin 12 with shortened barrel and no stock, classified as an Any Other Weapon by the NFA.
