= Pancor Jackhammer =

Pancor Jackhammer Mk3A2
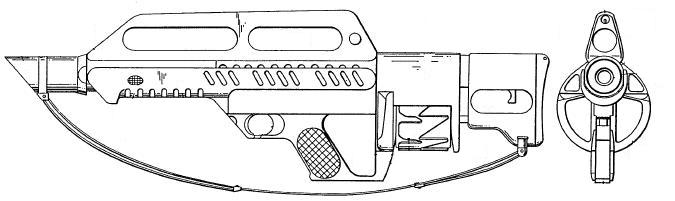
- 1987 patent drawing of the Jackhammer
- Type: Bullpup revolver automatic shotgun
- Place of origin: United States

Production history
- Designer: John Anderson
- Designed: 1984
- Manufacturer: Pancor Corporation
- No. built: 3 (2 were destroyed in testing)

Specifications
- Mass: 7.9 kg (17 lb)
- Length: 787 mm (31.0 in)
- Barrel length: 525 mm (20.7 in)
- Cartridge: 12 gauge 2 3/4 in (70 mm)
- Action: Gas-operated, revolving cylinder
- Rate of fire: 240 rpm
- Feed system: 10-shot detachable cylinder
- Sights: Iron sights

The Pancor Corporation Jackhammer is a 12-gauge, blow-forward gas-operated bullpup automatic shotgun designed by John A. Anderson in 1984 and patented in 1987. Only three working prototypes of the Jackhammer were built, but despite notable interest, legal and financial difficulties meant the Jackhammer never entered production, though it was notably popular as a prop weapon in films, television shows, and video games in the 1990s and 2000s, owing to its futuristic design and unusual operation.

A Korean War veteran, Anderson had problems with the slow reloading process of the pump action shotguns he used during his service, leading him to attempt a shotgun design without this drawback. There were reportedly several foreign governments that expressed interest in Anderson's design, with initial production units being ordered, however the design was eventually rejected after testing.

The weapon features a 10-round cylinder behind the trigger, using a similar mechanism for rotation as seen in the Webley–Fosbery revolver. These cylinders were also designed to be used as a device akin to land mines, known as a 'Bear Trap'. Designed to contain the pressure of firing, these cylinders could be loaded with shells in each slot, then fitted with a mechanism for firing the shells.

== Development ==
The Jackhammer was designed by John A. Anderson, who formed the company Pancor Industries in New Mexico. Anderson, a Korean War veteran, found the pump action shotguns he used in the war to be awkward and time consuming to reload, and believed he could design a better shotgun without this flaw.

Testing was conducted by HP White Labs in destructive tests that destroyed two of the three prototypes. These models reportedly had 4 lb (1.8 kg) of material removed with increased stamping instead of casting and a different easier method of reloading, meaning they are not reflective of what an actual production model could have resembled. Several dozen non-functioning examples were also made from sheet tin, balsa wood, and clay in order to make working tool prototypes.

Reportedly, several foreign governments expressed interest in the design and even ordered initial production units once ready for delivery. However, export of the design was held up for production due to United States Department of Defense testing, though the design was eventually rejected. Civilian sales were made impossible in the U.S. by the classification of the Jackhammer as a machine gun and restrictions on machine gun manufacture enacted in 1986. Additionally, foreign governments that did express interest were unwilling to finance development and final production. With no customers and little interest, Pancor went bankrupt. Supposed overseas orders were subject to United States Department of State approval that was not forthcoming. The assets of Pancor were sold off, including the few prototypes built.

A toolroom prototype that is in technical firing condition, but is constructed largely with machine screws and requires disassembly to reload, was owned by Movie Gun Services, during which time its forend was replaced with an MP5SD handguard. This example has since been auctioned off. Another prototype with more refined construction, though non-functional, was legally registered as a machine gun and has also been seen auctioned.

== Design ==
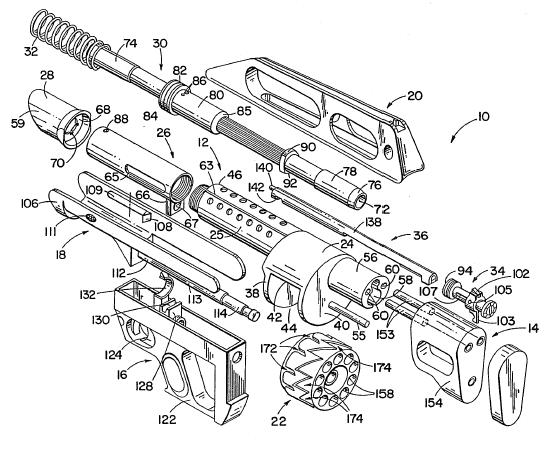
Components of the Jackhammer machine shotgun

Though unconventional, the Jackhammer can best be described as a gas-operated revolver. Many parts were constructed of Rynite polymer to reduce weight. Layout was of a bullpup configuration with a 10-round revolving cylinder that fired conventional 12-gauge shells. The cylinder's method of rotation was very similar to the Webley–Fosbery Automatic Revolver, an operating rod being used to rotate the cylinder, although gas-operated as opposed to the recoil operation of the Webley-Fosbery.

The Jackhammer is capable of semi-automatic and fully automatic fire by way of a thumb safety/selector switch. At the moment of firing, the front of the shell sealed inside the breech of the barrel much like the Nagant M1895 revolver. Unlike the Nagant, whose cylinder moved forward to form the seal, the barrel of the Jackhammer was driven forward and away from the cylinder by a ring-piston, using gas tapped from the bore. As the barrel moved forward, the breech cleared the front of the fired cartridge and an operating rod attached to the barrel rotated the cylinder through a "zig-zag" cam arrangement. As the next shell aligned with the bore, the barrel returned under spring pressure back into the front end of the cylinder. Spent shells were retained in the cylinder, as in a traditional revolver. The Jackhammer has a charging handle in the forward grip to charge the weapon and a cocking lever in the buttstock to recock the firing mechanism in case of light strikes to the primer. For reloading, the cylinder was removed from the bottom of its housing and shells were manually extracted. Removing the cylinder required the barrel be moved and secured in the forward position.

An animation of how the Webley-Fosbery type action operates

== Bear Trap anti-personnel device ==
Unique to the Jackhammer was the ability to convert a loaded cylinder from the weapon into an anti-personnel device similar to a land mine by the addition of a firing mechanism. The cylinder would be loaded with up to ten 12-gauge shells and the firing mechanism fitted over the bottom section of the cylinder. A pressure plate or plunger can then set to mechanically fire the shells in the cylinder upon pressing or initiate a spring-loaded timer which can be set to trigger firing up to twelve hours later, in one hour intervals. As the cylinder is designed to contain the pressure of firing normally, it can be discharged and reused when used in Bear Trap configuration.

There is some disagreement over whether working models of the Bear Trap were built. According to Ian McCollum of Forgotten Weapons, no working prototypes were produced, but plastic model prototypes were produced and reportedly worked well. However, according to Janes, development of the Bear Trap was fully completed as of 1994.

== See also ==
- Armsel Striker – South African revolver-type combat shotgun
- Atchisson AA-12
- Daewoo Precision Industries USAS-12
- Saiga-12 – Russian shotgun
- List of bullpup firearms
- List of shotguns
