= Saiga-12 =

Russian shotgun

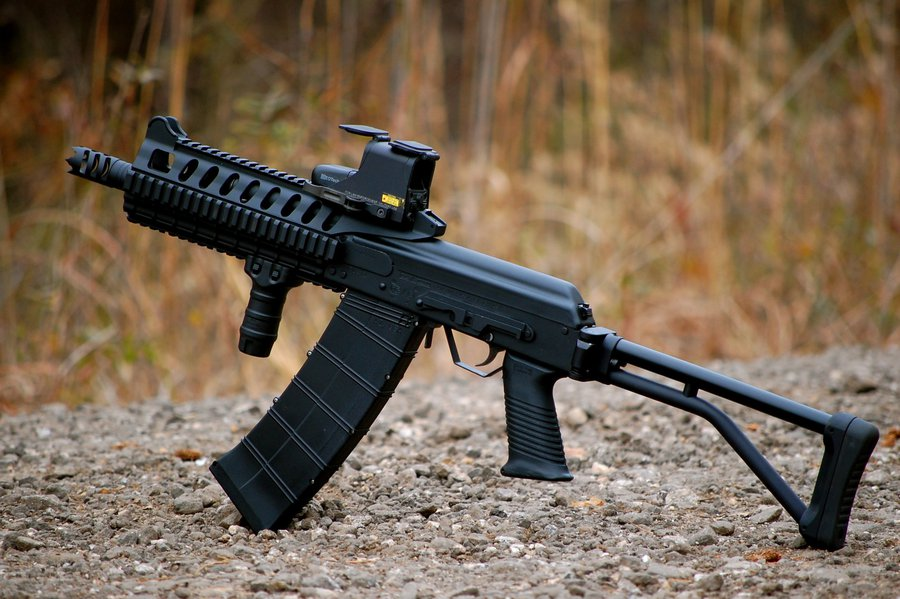
- US civilian aftermarket modified "Saiga-12" shotgun
- Type: Semi-automatic shotgun; Automatic shotgun (If converted)
- Place of origin: Russia

Service history
- Used by: See Users
- Wars: Russo-Ukrainian war

Production history
- Designer: Mikhail Kalashnikov
- Designed: 1990s
- Manufacturer: Kalashnikov Concern
- Produced: 1997–present
- Variants: Saiga-12; Saiga-12S; Saiga-12K; Saiga-12S EXP-01; Saiga-12K-030; Saiga-12K-040 Taktika

Specifications
- Mass: 3.6 kg (7.9 lb) (Saiga-12, Saiga-12S); 3.5 kg (7.7 lb) (Saiga-12K, Saiga-12S EXP-01)
- Length: 1,145 mm (45.1 in) (Saiga-12); 1,060 mm (41.7 in) stock extended / 820 mm (32.3 in) stock folded (Saiga-12S); 910 mm (35.8 in) stock extended / 670 mm (26.4 in) stock folded (Saiga-12K, Saiga-12S EXP-01)
- Barrel length: 580 mm (22.8 in) (Saiga-12, Saiga-12S); 430 mm (16.9 in) (Saiga-12K, Saiga-12S EXP-01)
- Height: 190 mm (7.5 in)
- Caliber: 12-gauge, 20-gauge, and .410 bore
- Action: Gas-operated, rotating bolt
- Rate of fire: Semi-automatic: 200 rounds/min Fully automatic: 450 rounds/min
- Effective firing range: 70 m (77 yd)
- Feed system: 2, 5, 8, and 10 round detachable box magazine, 12, 20 or 30 round detachable drum magazine
- Sights: Iron sights

The Saiga-12 (/ˈsaɪɡə/) is a semi-automatic shotgun manufactured by the Russian company Kalashnikov Concern, with an automatic shotgun conversion option. It is patterned on the Kalashnikov series of assault rifles and available in a wide range of configurations. It is named after the Saiga antelope native to Russia.

== Design ==
Like the Kalashnikov rifle variants, it is a rotating bolt, long-stroke gas piston operated firearm that feeds from a detachable box magazine.

All Saiga-12 configurations are recognizable as Kalashnikov-pattern guns by the large lever-safety on the right side of the receiver, the optic mounting rail on the left side of the receiver, and the large top-mounted dust cover held in place by the rear of the recoil spring assembly.

Developers position this model as a "universal" firearm, equally suited for self-defense, practical shooting, recreational shooting, and short-range hunting. Its military origin and versatility influence its strengths and weaknesses.

The shotgun's automation system is highly refined, ensuring reliable operation even with rubber buckshot rounds, which are problematic for most semi-auto shotguns.

The firearm is well-adapted for mounting various optical sights and is the first in the "Saiga" series to come with factory Picatinny rails.

Additionally, it includes a specially designed muzzle device that allows the use of "breaching" ammunition (for breaking door locks, hinges, etc.) while also functioning as an effective flash suppressor.

It is compatible with the full range of muzzle attachments for the 12-gauge "Saiga" series. However, its compactness comes at the cost of reduced effective range, with accuracy dropping significantly beyond 40 meters, even with a choke attachment. In contrast, the longer-barreled hunting "Saiga" maintains a minimum accuracy of 60% at this range.

The traditional AK "rock and lock" magazine system and the difficulties associated with magazine has been replaced by a vertical insertion system that allows the magazine to be inserted with only one hand.

The hinged dustcover with a picatinny rail makes mounting optics simpler, and is closer to the bore axis, making sighting of optics easier.

The gas-block rail system allows for the addition of combat lights and vertical foregrips. The last round bolt hold open gives the user instant feedback that the firearm is empty and allows for a quicker magazine change.

=== Modifications to the basic Kalashnikov pattern ===
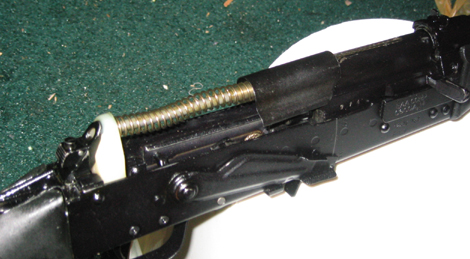
Receiver (with aftermarket recoil buffer)

The Saiga-12 incorporates several features absent on the Kalashnikov and its derivatives.

Since shotgun shells are nearly twice as wide as 7.62×39mm cartridge, the extraction port in the side of the dust cover had to be increased in size. However, since the bolt had to remain the same length to fit inside the AK-47 sized receiver, the rear section of the bolt is covered by a sliding metal flap that rides on the recoil spring. This allows the gun to be sealed against dirt when the bolt is forward, but the compression of the recoil spring during firing moves the flap rearward to clear the extracted shells.

For the likely reason of simplifying production of Izhmash's other Kalashnikov-pattern guns, the Saiga-12 extractor does not rotate, but instead delegates the bolt-locking function to a caliber-neutral lug directly behind the bolt-face.

The Saiga-12 incorporates an adjustable two-position gas system, with "standard" and "magnum" settings for firing 2-3/4" and 3"-length shells respectively. This is because firing 3" shells with high power loads such as slugs and buckshot generates so much force that the receiver will be damaged if the full power of the gas system is employed without some sort of recoil buffer. The problem is that making the gun durable with such high power loads would make it more likely to experience a cycle failure with the less powerful 2-3/4" shells and likely not to cycle at all when used with low-powered less lethal ammunition. This would essentially render it a straight-pull mechanism.

=== Common configurations ===
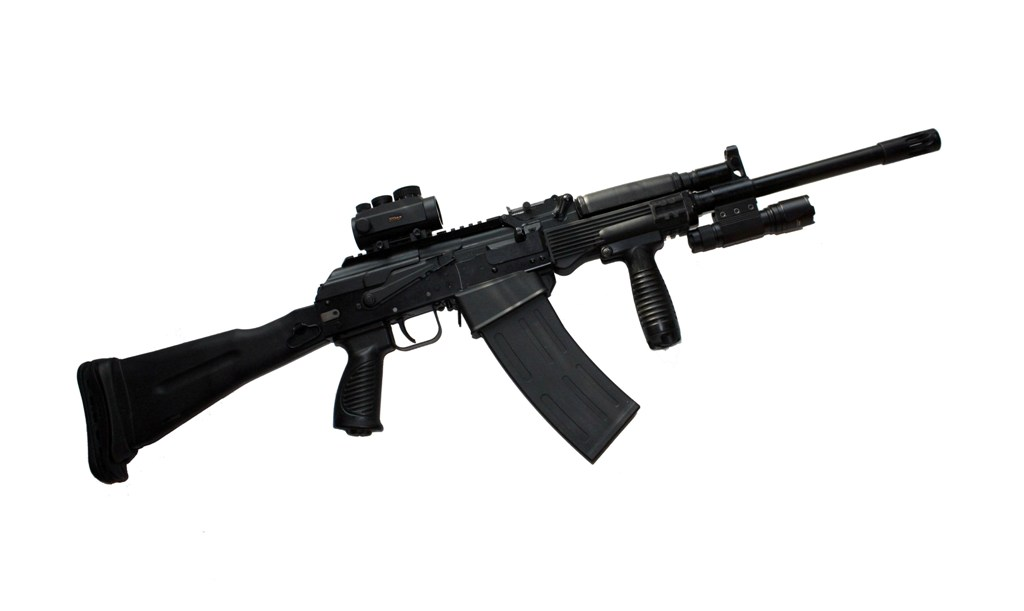
Tactical shotgun Saiga 12К 030

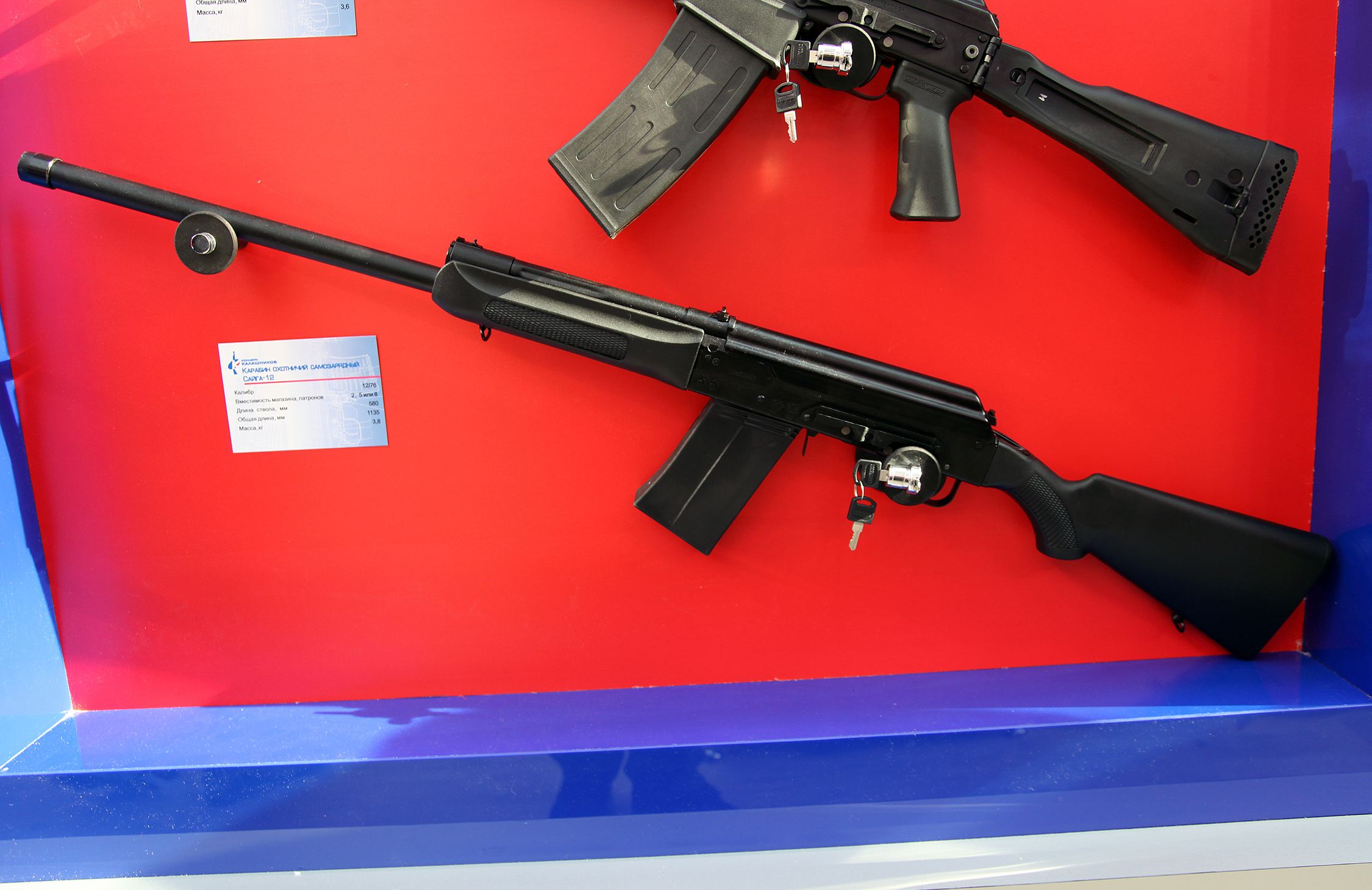
Saiga 12 with 23 in (580 mm) barrel and sporting buttstock, appealing to the hunting market in Russia

The Saiga 12 is manufactured in several different configurations, ranging from more traditional styled hunting models to military-style models utilizing AK or SVD hardware.

All of these versions are available for purchase by civilians in Russia after applying for a firearms permit.

Civilian barrel lengths are 430 and 580 mm (17 and 23 in). The 580 mm (23 in) version is standard with a traditional rifle stock or with an AK-style separate pistol grip and folding stock (version S for "skladnaya", which means "folding" in English). The 430 mm (17 in) version (K for "korotkaya", which means "short" in English) has an AK-style pistol grip and folding stock. "Taktika" versions with 430 and 580 mm (17 and 23 in) barrels feature various AK, SVD, or original "Legion" furniture (handguards, folding and non-folding stocks) and AK-style open sights with high post and tangent rear. Optional screw-in chokes are available. A standard AK rail for optics may be mounted on the left side of the receiver.

Capacities of 2, 5, 7, 8, and 12 round box magazines are available, as well as ten, twelve, and twenty round aftermarket drum magazines. All magazines may be interchanged with all 12 gauge models (sometimes minor fitting may be necessary), although factory-original magazines from Russia only exist in 5, 7, and 8 round box configurations. The magazine configuration is significantly altered compared to more typical Kalashnikov rifles in order to accommodate the larger 12 gauge cartridge.

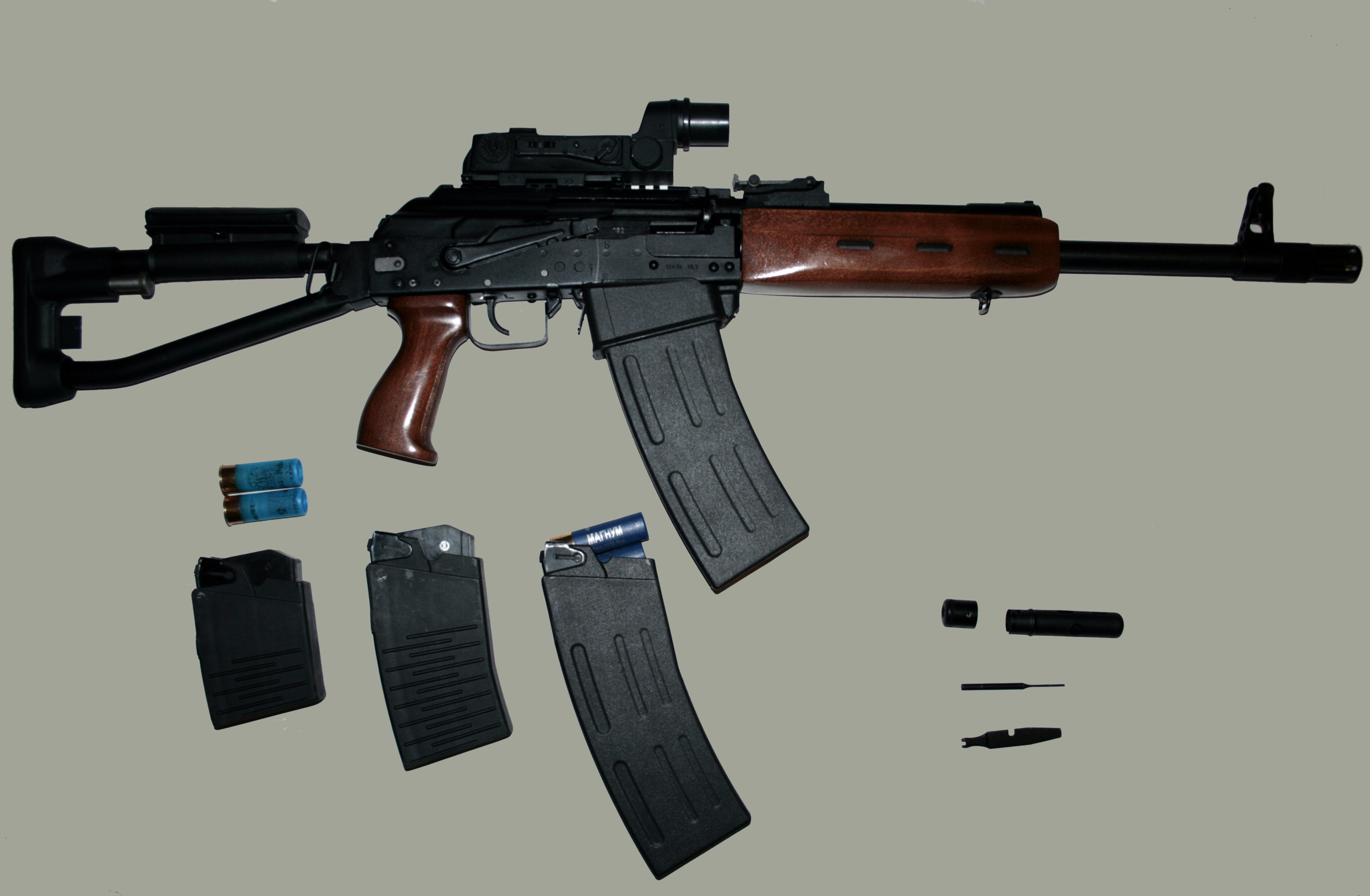
Saiga 12K 040 Taktika with collimator sight "Kobra"

== Variants ==
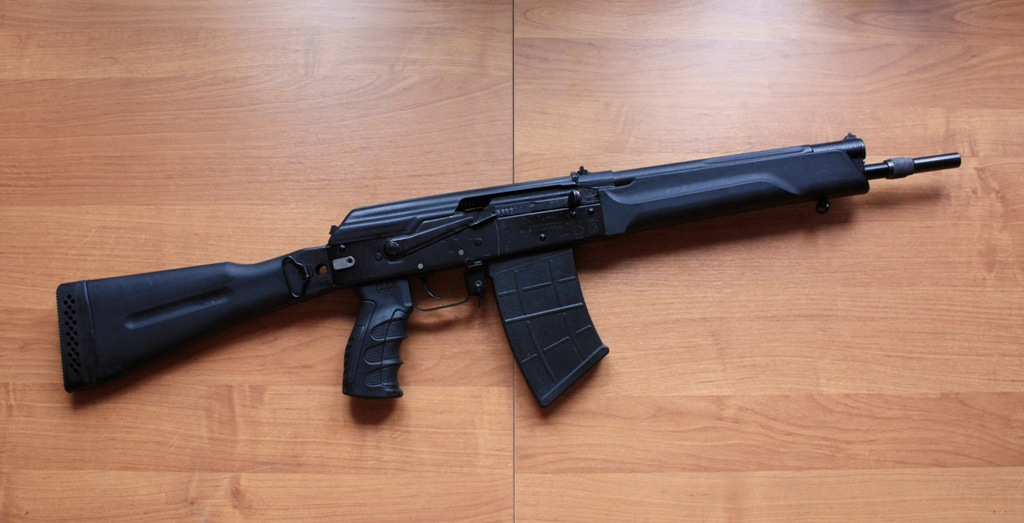
Smooth-bore Saiga-410K, chambered in .410 Magnum

The Saiga-12 is manufactured by Kalashnikov Concern (the merger of Izhmash and Izhevsk), in Russia.

Kalashnikov Concern also manufactures Saiga-20s (20-gauge) and Saiga-410s (.410 bore), as well as the Saiga semi-automatic hunting rifles chambered in various centerfire rifle calibers.

Variant	Configuration	Setup	References
Saiga-12 ver. 75	Shotgun	Quick-detachable wooden hunting stock and fore-end, interchangeable muzzle attachments, 580 mm barrel, adjustable sighting rail	
Saiga-12K-040	Shotgun	Modification of the "Saiga-12K" featuring a wooden ergonomic grip and a folding stock from the SVD-S sniper rifle	
Saiga-12 ver. 261	Shotgun	Equipped with a magazine well, a stock with a rotating cheek rest similar to the SVD, plastic fore-end, plastic hunting stock. Features interchangeable muzzle attachments. The receiver has a rail for mounting an optical sight.	
Saiga-12C ver. 10	Shotgun	Equipped with a folding "assault rifle-style" stock and a 580 mm barrel. Capable of firing with the stock folded.	
Saiga-12K ver. 10	Shotgun	Equipped with a folding "assault rifle-style" stock and a 430 mm barrel. Cannot fire with the stock folded.	
Saiga-12 ver. 278	Shotgun	Equipped with a "magazine well" type receiver, a plastic stock similar to the AK, and a pistol grip. Equipped with interchangeable muzzle attachments.	
Saiga-12 ver. 340	Shotgun	Equipped with an improved gas system for low-impulse ammunition, a "magazine well" type receiver, a reactive muzzle brake designed by V.V. Ilyin, and the ability to release the magazine without removing the hand from the grip.	
Saiga-12K ver. 043	Carbine (Ks-18.5)	Equipped with a magazine well, an adjustable sighting rail, a folding "assault rifle-style" stock, and a plastic fore-end. The carbine has a safety mechanism that allows firing only with the stock extended.	
Saiga-12K ver. 030	Carbine (Ks-18.5)	Modified per Russian law to include a stock-lock safety mechanism (except for the EXP variant). It differs from the standard "Saiga-12K" by its "magazine well" receiver, a hinged top cover with an integrated Picatinny rail, a folding "assault rifle-style" stock (plastic or metal similar to the SVD-S), and a plastic fore-end similar to the AK.	
Saiga-12C ver. 031	Carbine (Ks-18.5)	Modified per Russian law to include a stock-lock safety mechanism (except for the EXP variant). It differs from the standard "Saiga-12K" by its "magazine well" receiver, a hinged top cover with an integrated Picatinny rail, a folding "assault rifle-style" stock (plastic or metal similar to the SVD-S), and a plastic fore-end similar to the AK.	
Saiga-12EXP-01 ver. 030	Carbine (Ks-18.5)	Modified per Russian law to include a stock-lock safety mechanism (except for the EXP variant). It differs from the standard "Saiga-12K" by its "magazine well" receiver, a hinged top cover with an integrated Picatinny rail, a folding "assault rifle-style" stock (plastic or metal similar to the SVD-S), and a plastic fore-end similar to the AK.	
Saiga-12K ver. 033	Carbine (Ks-18.5)	Shortened version of the Saiga-12K ver. 030, featuring a 330 mm barrel. Released for sale in 2016	

Recently, a newly configured version of the Saiga-12 was introduced. Called the Saiga Taktika Mod 040, it features an extended magazine well, last round bolt hold open (recently produced very rarely and replaced with manual bolt hold), hinged dust cover with a Picatinny rail for mounting optics, picatinny rail gas block, and a newly designed 8 round box magazine (which is not interchangeable with other Saiga-12 models).

In late September 2014, the IZ109T was released in the USA. This model featured a shortened barrel with a permanently attached brake. The barrel length was 18 in (460 mm) including the brake. The IZ109T also had military style features, including a rear pistol grip and 6 position stock. Various modifications were made to the trigger group, bolt, and bolt carrier that allowed loaded magazine insertion without locking the bolt back. The IZ109T also featured a fully parkerized military finish.

== Legal status ==
Saiga firearms are meant for civilian domestic sale in Russia, and export to international markets.

=== Russia ===
In Russia, this shotgun can be relatively simply obtained, requiring only a "smoothbore-gun license" (which is relatively easy to obtain, compared to a "rifle license" that requires a five-year period of owning a smoothbore gun and a hunting permit).

The civilian version of the 12K for the Russian domestic market features a specially designed safety, preventing operation with stock folded (due to Russian gun laws, it is illegal to own a firearm with a barrel length of less than 500 mm (20 in) and capable of firing while being less than 800 mm (31 in) long).

Russian armed forces use a combat shotgun variant called the KSK (Karabin Spetsialniy Kalahnikov, "Kalashnikov Special Carbine"), with the 12-gauge size expressed in its metric equivalent of 18.5 mm. The Picatinny rail layout is similar to the civilian 030 version.

=== Exportation ===
Prior to importation to the US, all Saiga shotguns are configured with a traditional fixed "hunting-style" rifle stock and 5 round box magazine. Factory 8 round box magazines are not imported in the US (though they are legal for importation into other countries), making them quite rare on the civilian market.

In response to the annexation of Crimea by the Russian Federation, U.S. President Barack Obama issued Executive Order 13662 on July 16, 2014, blocking the importation of all Russia-produced firearms.

== Users ==
- Egypt: Used By Central Security Forces Special Operations Police.
- France: Used by RAID and GIPN.
- Indonesia: Saiga-12C used by the National Anti Narcotics Agency (BNN).
- Kyrgyzstan: Used by police forces.
- Russia: Saiga-12 used by private security companies; 18.5 KS-K carbine adopted by Ministry of Internal Affairs in 2006; since 2023 Saiga-12 shotguns were used in Armed forces (as auxiliary weapon against low-flying UAVs).
- Ukraine: In 2009 Saiga-12K Tactical carbine was adopted by Ukrainian Navy.
- United States: Some police SWAT teams and military units such as the Deployable Specialized Forces in the Coast Guard.

== See also ==
- Akdal MKA 1919
- Armsel Striker
- Atchisson Assault Shotgun
- Combat shotgun
- Heckler & Koch HK CAWS
- List of Russian weaponry
- List of shotguns
- NeoStead 2000
- Origin-12
- Saiga semi-automatic rifle
- SPAS-15
- USAS-12
- VEPR-12

== Sources ==
- 18,5 мм карабин специальный с коробчатым магазином 18,5КС-К. Руководство по эксплуатации 18,5КС-К РЭ - 2008 г.
