= AA-12 =

AA-12 may refer to:

- R-77, a medium-range, air-to-air tactical missile
- Atchisson AA-12, an automatic combat shotgun
