= Vepr-12 =

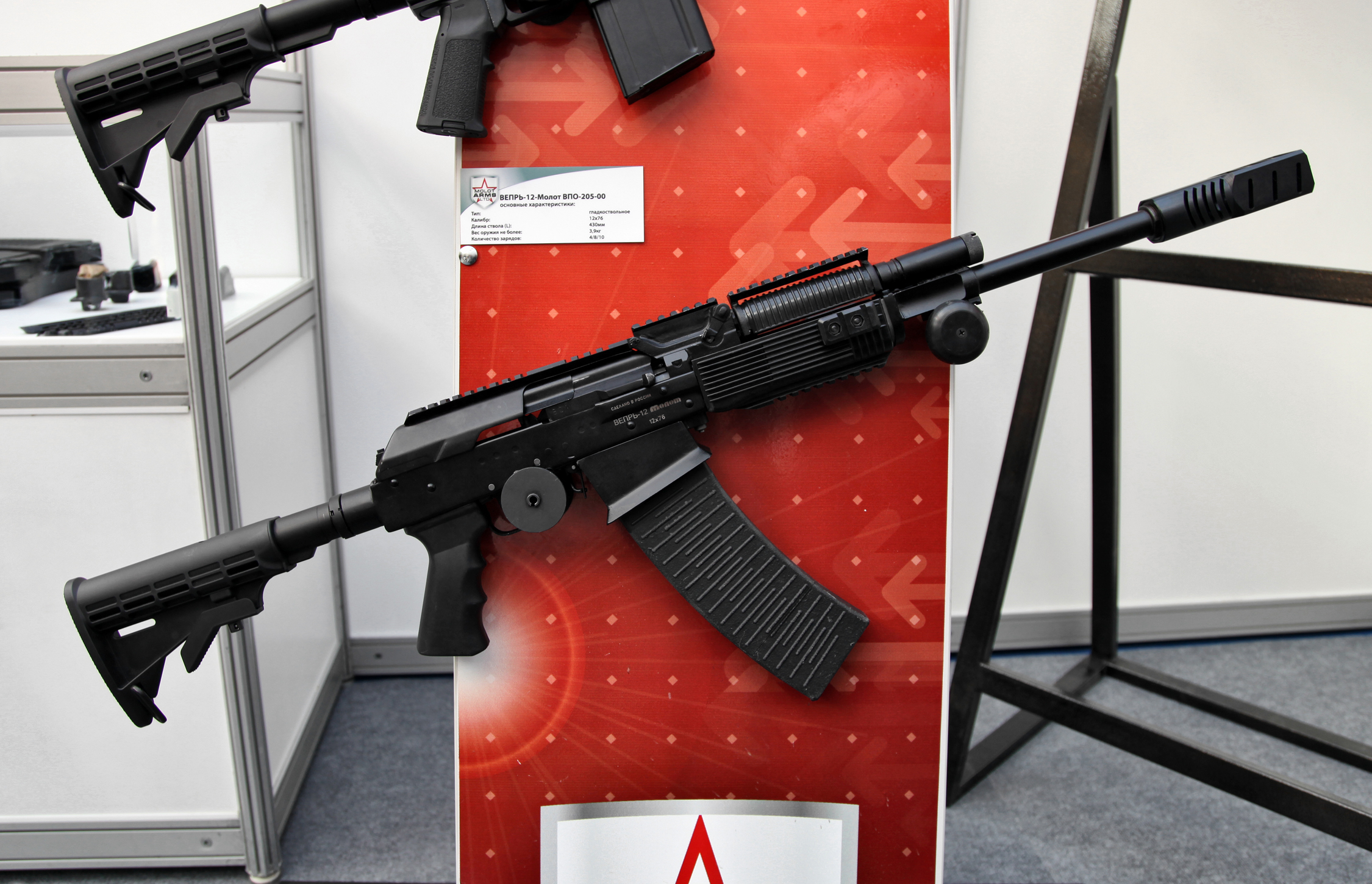
- Carbine ВПО-206 (VPO-206) with collapsible stock
- Type: Semi-automatic shotgun
- Place of origin: Russia

Service history
- Used by: See #Users
- Wars: War in Afghanistan; Iraq War; Syrian Civil War; Russo-Ukrainian War

Production history
- Designer: OOO "Молот-Оружие" (OOO "Molot Weapons")
- Manufacturer: Molot Oruzhie Ltd.
- Produced: 2003–present
- Variants: 4

Specifications
- Mass: (Unloaded) 4.2 kg to 4.55 kg
- Length: (With stock fold/unfolded) 867–1227 mm
- Width: (With stock folded) 705 mm
- Height: (With stock unfolded) 290 mm
- Cartridge: 2 3/4" 12 gauge (18.5×70 mmR) or 12 gauge 3" Magnum (18.5×76 mmR)
- Caliber: 12 gauge (18.5 mm)
- Action: Gas-operated, rotating bolt
- Effective firing range: 100 m
- Feed system: 2-, 4-, 5-, 8-, 10-, or 12-round box magazines, 20- or 25-round detachable drum magazines
- Sights: Tangent

The Vepr-12 is a multipurpose semi-automatic detachable-magazine shotgun, produced by Molot-Oruzhie Ltd.

== History ==
Early versions of the Vepr-12 were produced by Izhmash, with production moving to the Molot factory where the shotgun was redesigned and mass-produced.

The Vepr-12 is intended to be a direct competitor to the widely popular Saiga-12 shotgun already produced by Izhmash.

== Design ==
The Vepr-12 is patterned after the original Kalashnikov rifle and built on the heavier RPK light machine gun receiver.

Like the Saiga, the Vepr-12 was designed to be a versatile weapons platform, capable of being used by hunters and professional shooters alike.

With these considerations in mind, Molot introduced unique features, such as the ambidextrous safety selector, the bolt hold-open mechanism and a simplified magazine feeding mechanism.

=== Ergonomics ===
Like all firearms with the Vepr designation, the Vepr-12 receiver is patterned after that of the RPK light machine gun.

The stamped steel receiver is reinforced, thicker (1.5 mm instead of 1 mm), and more heavily constructed than a standard Kalashnikov-pattern rifle.

A side folding stock is present on most models; however, Vepr-12 shotguns are offered with fixed stocks as well.

The Vepr-12 is also chrome lined throughout, including the gas block, barrel, and chamber, affording the shotgun excellent corrosion resistance.

The Vepr-12 lacks the standard AK side mounting rail, instead using a Picatinny rail incorporated into the dust cover for optic mounting. The dust cover is hinged to the shotgun, allowing the user to open and close the cover without losing the zeroing of a mounted optic.

=== Safety ===
The Vepr-12 incorporates a unique safety catch and bolt release mechanism.

Instead of the standard AK safety selector, some Vepr-12 shotguns have an ambidextrous safety that can be manipulated from either side of the receiver.

=== Operation ===
Due to the large difference in size between the 7.62×39mm cartridge and 12-gauge shells, the extractor port has been lengthened, allowing the shotgun to eject spent shells without risk of causing a stovepipe malfunction.

An unusual feature among firearms in the Kalashnikov family, the Vepr-12 sports a last round bolt hold-open mechanism. That is, the bolt locks to the rear of the receiver after the last round has been ejected. To facilitate rapid reloading of the shotgun, a bolt release lever is located inside the trigger guard, allowing the user to release the bolt without breaking grip.

The addition of a magazine well, another unusual feature for a Kalashnikov-pattern firearm, allows for "straight in" magazine insertion, as opposed to the "rock and lock" procedure required on standard AK rifles and the Saiga-12 shotgun.

Unlike the IZ-109 manually adjustable gas regulator system used on the Saiga-12, the gas system on the Vepr-12 is a clone of the IZ-433 unregulated fixed open port tappet system, allowing the Vepr-12 to cycle most commercially available 12-gauge loads, from 3.25 dram equivalent and up, without risking damage to the shotgun and without requiring any manual adjustment by the user.

This versatile system is often erroneously characterized as a "self-regulating" gas system. However, no variable regulating mechanism is present.

Also, like the IZ-433, the gas block lacks a screw in gas adjuster. Instead, the piston is accessed in a manner familiar to users of traditional Kalashnikov rifles, by removal of the gas tube. A notch on the operating rod allows the user to hook the piston and pull it out to the rear for cleaning.

== Variants ==
The Vepr-12 is manufactured in numerous variations, each with a unique designation.

The Vepr-12 can use the same magazines as the Saiga-12 with modifications, but the Saiga-12 cannot use Vepr-12 magazines and drums.

=== ВПО-205 (VPO-205) ===
The VPO-205 series is chambered for 12 gauge (18.5×70mmR) and 12 gauge Magnum (18.5×76mmR) shells. It has a side-folding two-strut folding stock with a buttpad and reversible cheekpad.

Variant	Description
ВПО-205-00	Stock model with a 16.92-inch [430mm] barrel with detachable muzzle brake. It weighs 8.59 lbs. [3.9 kg].
ВПО-205-01	Sporting model with a 20.4-inch [520mm] barrel. Includes a permanently fixed muzzle-brake and can be fired with the stock folded. It weighs 8.81 lbs. [4.0 kg].
ВПО-205-02	Competition model, includes a 26.77-inch [680mm] barrel with interchangeable chokes. It weighs 9.25 lbs. [4.2 kg].
ВПО-205-03	Compact model, includes a 12-inch [305 mm] barrel with detachable muzzle brake. It is 34.13 inches [867 mm] overall in length with the stock fixed and 23.66 inches [601 mm] long with the stock folded. It has short Picatinny rails on the sides of the forend and under the end of the barrel and long Picatinny rails on the top of the receiver and the bottom of the forend. It weighs 9.25 lbs. [4.2 kg].
ВПО-205-00-СП	Sporting model for IPSC.

=== ВПО-206 (VPO-206) ===
The VPO-206 series is chambered for 12 Gauge [18.5x70mmR] shells. It has a collapsible Colt M4-style Magpul sliding stock.

Variant	Description
ВПО-206-00	Stock model with a 16.92-inch [430mm] barrel with detachable muzzle brake. Weighs 9.47 lbs. [4.3 kg].
ВПО-206-01	Sporting model with a 20.4-inch [520mm] barrel with a fixed muzzle brake. Weighs 9.7 lbs. [4.4 kg].
ВПО-206-02	Competition model with a 26.77-inch [680mm] barrel with interchangeable chokes. Weighs 10 lbs. [4.55 kg].

== Export and legal status ==
The Vepr-12 is exported worldwide. Ownership in Russia requires only a smoothbore-gun license.

Due to Russian law, domestic and many export versions of the shotgun are equipped with a disconnector that will render the gun unable to fire while the stock is folded (only if the length of the weapon becomes less than 800 mm).

The shotgun was also imported into the United States. Early American export models have no muzzle brake and have a fixed stock rather than a folding stock. Later models included a fully functional folding stock.

== Users ==
- Belarus
- France
  - Recherche, Assistance, Intervention, Dissuasion
- Germany
  - Spezialeinsatzkommando
- Greece
  - Special Suppressive Antiterrorist Unit
- Nicaragua
  - Seen in hands of Nicaraguan Army soldiers.
- North Korea
  - Seen in use with North Korean troops in the Kursk region.
- Syria
- Russia

== See also ==
- Akdal MKA 1919
- Origin-12
- Saiga-12
