= SCMITR =

Experimental military shotgun ammunition

SCMITR was part of an experimental military shotgun ammunition created in the 1970s by AAI Corporation. It was a variation on flechette ammunition, but instead of containing a bundle of tiny needle-like steel darts, the cartridge contained a stack of razor-edged stamped sheet-metal arrow shapes designed to fly aerodynamically. It was considered to be very promising (in terms of lethality and effective range) but prohibitively expensive to manufacture, so it has never been mass-produced.

== Development ==
SCMITR was part of the CAWS (Close Assault Weapon System) program, which investigated ~20 mm smoothbore weapons (basically combat shotguns) designed to be effective to ranges of 150 metres against combatants wearing body armor. Flechettes, with their high sectional density, were ideal for penetrating rigid or soft composite armor, but the wounds caused by the tiny darts were considered insufficient to disable an enemy combatant, as the tiny hole would quickly clot and cause relatively little bleeding. The SCMITR darts had the same sectional density as flechettes, but the wide, flat shape of the SCMITR produced a larger, more disabling wound. Since the SCMITR darts were stamped from sheet metal, they had only two fins, which is not enough to provide stability. To overcome this, the fins were twisted slightly, which causes the dart to spin when flying, producing a stable projectile.

The SCMITR cartridge was loaded with eight of these flechettes, each weighing about 1 gram. Dispersion was low, with all eight flechettes capable of hitting within a four-metre circle at a range of 150 metres. Retained velocity at 150 metres was 365 m/s, sufficient for the flechettes to penetrate 76 mm of pine or 3 mm of mild steel.

== Applications ==
The SCMITR project was cancelled with the cancellation of the CAWS project in the late 1980s. The most commonly encountered photograph, in Thomas Swearengen's book The World's Fighting Shotguns, shows a SCMITR shell clearly marked as a 20 gauge, smaller than the nominal 12 gauge bore used by the AAI CAWS entry.

== See also ==
- AAI CAWS—another product of the CAWS program from AAI
- Advanced Combat Rifle
- HK CAWS—another product of the CAWS program from Heckler & Koch
- Needlegun
