= CAW =

CAW may refer to:

- Canadian Auto Workers, a former trade union in that country (now merged into Unifor)
- Carbon arc welding, a process which produces coalescence of metals by heating them with an arc between a nonconsumable carbon electrode and the work-piece
- Center for Asymmetric Warfare, a U.S. Navy entity dedicated to supporting American military forces
- Church of All Worlds, an American neopagan religious group
- Community Archives Wales, a website of digital content

Caw may refer to:

- Caw (bull), a legendary bull in Meitei mythology of Manipur
- Kallawaya language ISO 639-2 code
- Caw (hill), a hill in the south of the English Lake District, England
- Caw (sound), bird call of the genus Corvus
- Caw, County Londonderry, a townland in County Londonderry, Northern Ireland

== See also ==
- Caw Fell, a fell in the west of the English Lake District
- Hueil mab Caw, a Pictish warrior and traditional rival of King Arthur's
- CAWS (disambiguation)
