= Daewoo Precision Industries USAS-12 =

USAS-12
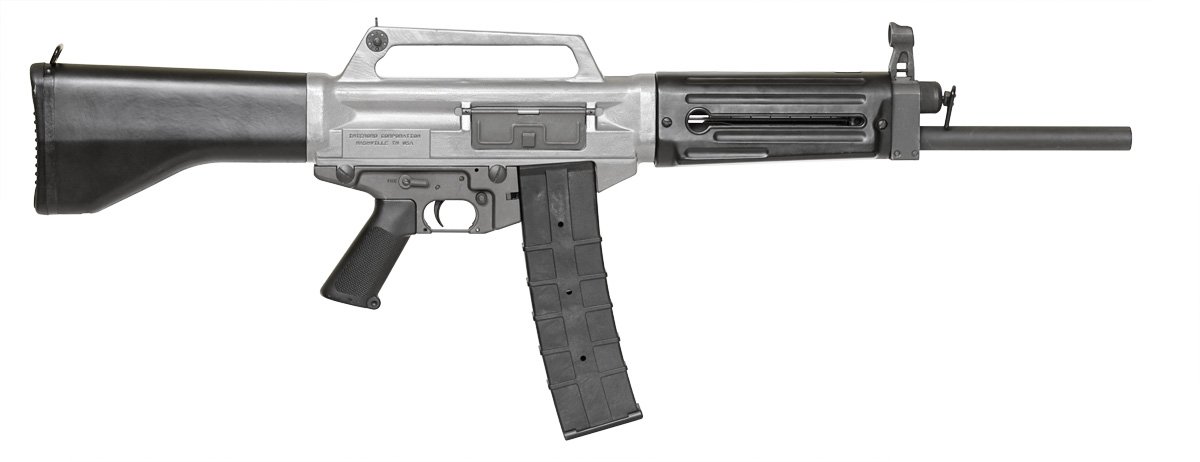
- The Daewoo Precision Industries USAS-12 automatic shotgun.
- Type: Automatic shotgun Semi-automatic (Civilian)
- Place of origin: South Korea; United States

Service history
- Used by: See Users

Production history
- Designer: John Trevor Jr.
- Designed: 1989
- Manufacturer: Daewoo Precision Industries, Interord Corp. (Nashville, Tennessee), RAMO Defense Co., Ameetec Arms LLC
- Produced: 1989–present
- No. built: >30,000
- Variants: Semi-automatic only for civilian commercial sales; select-fire for military and police

Specifications
- Mass: 5.45 kg without magazine 6.2 kg with 10-round magazine
- Length: 960 mm
- Barrel length: 460 mm
- Caliber: 12-gauge
- Rate of fire: 400-450 rounds per minute
- Muzzle velocity: 400 m/s (1,300 ft/s)
- Effective firing range: 30–40 m
- Maximum firing range: 50 m
- Feed system: 10-round detachable box magazine or 20-round drum magazine
- Sights: Iron sights

The USAS-12 (Universal Sporting Automatic Shotgun 12 gauge) is an automatic shotgun manufactured in South Korea by Daewoo Precision Industries since the 1980s.

== Design ==
The USAS-12 is a gas-operated, selective fire weapon, designed to provide sustained firepower in close-combat scenarios. It accepts detachable 10-round box magazines or 20-round drum magazines. Both types of magazine are made of polymer, and drum magazines have their rear side made from translucent polymer for quick determination of the number of shot shells left. It has an effective range of 40 meters. In the early 1990s, a new CQ model of the USAS-12 was created. It looks similar to the original model, but unlike the original, it lacks the front sight and has a re-modeled carry handle. The bolt locks on 1 cylindrical locking piece that moves up into round hole in barrel extension.

== History ==
The history of the USAS-12 dates from the 1980s vintage designs of Maxwell Atchisson. In about 1989, Gilbert Equipment Co. (USA) decided to bring up the selective fired weapon, broadly based on principles employed in Atchisson shotguns. The design of the new weapon was produced by John Trevor, Jr. Since Gilbert Equipment Co. had no manufacturing capabilities, it started to look for possible manufacturers. It turned out that the only maker that agreed to produce this weapon was the South Korean company Daewoo Precision Industries, a part of the Daewoo conglomerate. Daewoo engineers adapted the new weapon to their manufacturing techniques, and mass production commenced in the early 1990s. The USAS-12 sold well to military and security forces of several (unspecified) countries in Asia, and more than 30,000 USAS-12 shotguns were made by the mid-1990s.

During the same timeframe, Gilbert Equipment Co. tried to bring a semi-automatic version of the USAS-12 to the U.S. market, but Treasury Secretary Lloyd Bentsen classified this firearm as "having no sporting purpose", so it became a "destructive device" under the U.S. National Firearms Act of 1934. This greatly restricted its civilian use. During the late 1990s, RAMO Defence Co. began to assemble USAS-12 shotguns from Korean and U.S.-made parts for sale on the domestic market, but sales of this weapon were limited to government agencies only. The shotgun is still being manufactured by S&T Daewoo (now SNT Motiv) in Korea for military and law enforcement sales only.

A U.S. firearms manufacturer, Ameetec Arms LLC of Scottsdale, Arizona, started the manufacture of a USAS-12 semi-automatic clone in 2007, called the WM-12; it mainly differs from the USAS-12 by the lack of fixed sights and carrying handle, replaced by a Picatinny rail. The manufacturer stated that the WM-12 is not a "destructive device", and would thus be readily available to civilians. As of January 2008, however, the WM-12 was no longer to be found on Ameetec Arms online catalogs, because it was discontinued after its pre-production run. Only a few WM-12s were built using USAS-12 demilitarized shotguns.

== Users ==
- Brazil: Used by the GRUMEC and army Special Forces battalions
- Colombia:Used by GAULA, and COPES
- Dominican Republic:Used by Dominican Army
- Philippines:Used by private security forces.
- Peru
- South Korea:Used by the 707th Special Mission Group
- Thailand

=== Non-state Users ===
- Grupos de autodefensa comunitaria
- Karen National Liberation Army
- Los Zetas
- New People's Army

== Conflicts ==
- Mexican drug war
- Karen Conflict
- New People's Army rebellion

== See also ==
- Combat shotgun
- List of shotguns
- List of semi-automatic shotguns
- Saiga-12
- Riot shotgun
