= Heckler & Koch HK CAWS =

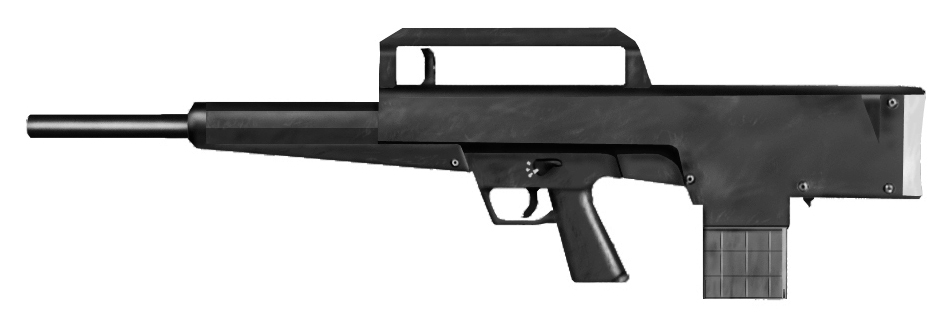
- The H&K CAWS
- Type: Bullpup automatic shotgun
- Place of origin: West Germany

Production history
- Designer: Heckler & Koch, Olin Industries (Winchester Group)
- Manufacturer: Heckler and Koch

Specifications
- Mass: 3.7 kg (8.2 lb) empty with magazine 4.3 kg (9.5 lb) loaded
- Length: 762 mm (30.0 in); 988 mm (38.9 in) (Barrel Extension)
- Barrel length: 457 mm (18.0 in); 685 mm (27.0 in) (Barrel Extension)
- Cartridge: Belted, straight (18.5×76 mmB); 12 Gauge
- Action: Select-fire Recoil operated with moving barrel and self-regulated gas assist
- Rate of fire: 200–300 rounds/min
- Muzzle velocity: Tungsten alloy 538 m/s (1,770 ft/s); 000 Buck 488 m/s 488 m/s (1,600 ft/s); Flechette 900 m/s (3,000 ft/s)
- Effective firing range: 150 m (160 yd)
- Feed system: 10-round detachable box magazine
- Sights: Iron sights Integrated optical sight

The Heckler & Koch HK CAWS (Close Assault Weapon System) is a prototype automatic shotgun—designed as a combat shotgun—co-produced by Heckler & Koch and Winchester/Olin during the 1980s. It was Heckler & Koch's entry into the U.S. military's Close Assault Weapon System program.

It is a 10-round, 12-gauge, bullpup shotgun with two firing modes: semi-auto and full-auto. The gun is fully ambidextrous.

== Development ==
The development of the HK CAWS started in response to the JSSAP requirement for Repeating Hand-held Improved Non-rifled Ordnance (RHINO), which itself grew out of the Special Operations Weapon (SOW) project. RHINO specified a magazine capacity of 10 rounds, a requirement for the new ammunition to be incompatible with commercial 12 gauge shotguns, that felt recoil to be no greater than a Remington 870P firing M162 or M257 buckshot cartridges, and that the system provide penetration and incapacitation capability significantly better than M162 and M257. In response, Olin and Winchester developed a 3 in (76 mm) belted brass cartridge containing 8 3.1 g (0.11 oz) tungsten alloy pellets fired at 538 m/s (1,770 ft/s) and capable of penetrating 20 mm (0.79 in) of pine wood or 1.5 mm (0.059 in) of a mild steel plate barrier at 150 m (160 yd). These cases were also capable of being loaded with 000 Buckshot or with flechettes. Olin, in support of HK's CAWS, also offered a flechette load, using twenty much smaller projectiles at a high velocity of approximately 2,950 ft/s (900 m/s)

By the early 1980s the CAWS program had taken over from RHINO. The main goal of this program was to develop a new personal firearm capable of firing multiple high-impulse projectiles (to improve hit chance in combat; effectively a shotgun) with an effective range of 100–150 m (110–160 yd). One of the teams entered in the CAWS race was Heckler & Koch Germany, coupled with Winchester Corp. United States. Heckler & Koch was responsible for developing a weapon, while Winchester was responsible for the development of new types of ammunition.

The resulting firearm designed around the Olin cartridges was the HK CAWS. With an outer casing of high impact plastic like HK's previous G11, the weapon was designed to reduce recoil through the use of an interior 'floating recoil system'. Despite the bullpup design, it was designed for ambidextrous use with ambidextrous fire selectors and safety levers and ejection converted from right to left by rotating the bolt head 180°. The chamber was configured to accept the proprietary belted cartridges as well as commercial 12 gauge rounds and the barrel could be fitted with a choke or choked barrel extension. The carry handle covers the cocking handle similar to the AR-10, and housed an optical sight which could be converted to a rail sight.

Although tested by the U.S. military, and beating out entries by AAI Corporation, Pan Associates Corporation, and Atchisson, the CAWS program was ultimately canceled as combat shotguns became increasingly niche and obsolete in modern warfare, and production and development of all related CAWS weapons, including the HK CAWS, were halted.

== See also ==
- SCMITR - another product of the CAWS program from AAI
- AAI CAWS - another product of the CAWS program from AAI
- List of bullpup firearms
- List of shotguns
- List of individual weapons of the U.S. Armed Forces
