= AAI CAWS =

- Type: Automatic shotgun
- Place of origin: United States

Production history
- Designer: AAI Corporation
- Manufacturer: AAI Corporation

Specifications
- Mass: 4.08 kg (9.0 lb)
- Length: 984 mm (38.7 in)
- Cartridge: 12 Gauge Special; 12 Gauge (with adapter)
- Action: Select-fire Recoil operated
- Rate of fire: 450 rounds/min
- Effective firing range: 150 m (160 yd)
- Feed system: 12-round detachable box magazine
- Sights: Day/Night Reflex sight with backup iron sights

The AAI CAWS (Close Assault Weapon System) is a prototype automatic shotgun—designed as a combat shotgun— produced by the AAI Corporation during the 1980s. It was AAI's entry into the U.S military's Close Assault Weapon System program.

It is a 12-round, 12-gauge shotgun with two firing modes: semi-auto and full-auto.

== Development ==
In 1982, the United States was seeking entrants for their Close Assault Weapon System program. Grown out of previous combat shotgun programs, this program had inherited the specification from the RHINO program that had preceded it. These specifications required a magazine capacity of 10 rounds, a requirement for the new ammunition to be incompatible with commercial 12ga shotguns, that felt recoil be no greater than a Remington 870P firing M162 or M257 buckshot cartridges and that the system provide penetration and incapacitation capability significantly better than M162 and M257. In response to this, AAI developed their entrant, the AAI CAWS - a select fire, recoil operated, magazine fed shotgun. Using the standard M-16 stock and pistol grip, recoil operation and with an inline design, felt recoil was supposedly less than an M16. A shorter version, without stock, was also developed for Airborne forces. A day/night Reflex sight was offered as standard.

To meet the requirements to both provide ammunition that could not be fired by commercial shotguns, but also for the weapon to fire commercial ammunition, AAI developed a special cartridge larger than 12-ga and then provided a chamber adapter for the weapon to fire regular 12ga. The standard antipersonnel cartridge developed by AAI was loaded with eight 1 gram (0.035 oz) drag stabilized flechettes. All eight flechettes were able to hit a 4 m (4.4 yd) circle at 150 m (160 yd). The flechettes at that range had a velocity of 365 m/s (1,200 ft/s) and were capable of penetrating 76 mm (3.0 in) of pine or 3 mm (0.12 in) of mild steel.

Although tested by the U.S. military, the CAWS was canceled, and production, both military and civilian, has halted.

== See also ==
- SCMITR - another product of the CAWS program from AAI
- HK CAWS - another product of the CAWS program from Heckler & Koch
- List of shotguns
- List of individual weapons of the U.S. Armed Forces
