= Atchisson AA-12 =

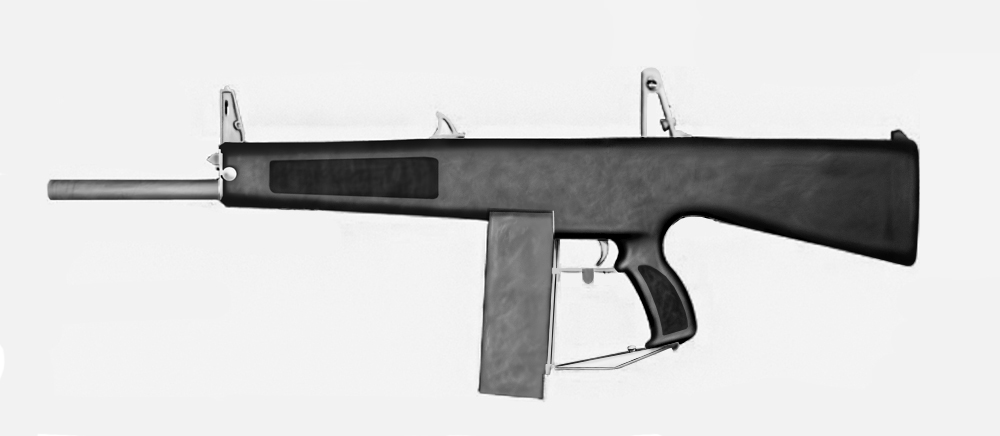
- AA-12 automatic combat shotgun
- Type: Automatic combat shotgun
- Place of origin: United States

Production history
- Designer: Maxwell Atchisson (1930–2003); further developed by Military Police Systems, Inc.
- Designed: Original design: 1972; MPS design: 2005
- Manufacturer: Maxwell Atchisson

Specifications
- Mass: 5.2 kg (11 lb) less magazine. 7.3 kg (16 lb) with loaded 32-round drum (original version)
- Length: 991 mm (39.0 in) (Atchisson Assault Shotgun, 1972); 966 mm (38.0 in) (AA-12, 2006)
- Barrel length: 457 mm (18.0 in)
- Cartridge: 12 gauge
- Action: API blowback (1972 design) Gas-operated (2005 design)
- Rate of fire: 300 rounds/min
- Muzzle velocity: 350 m/s (1,100 ft/s)
- Effective firing range: 100 m (110 yd) (12 gauge slug)
- Maximum firing range: 200 m (220 yd) (FRAG-12 ammunition)
- Feed system: 8 rounds in box magazine, 20 in drum magazine
- Sights: Iron sight, 2× zoom optical scope

The AA-12 (Auto Assault - 12), originally designed and known as the Atchisson Assault Shotgun, is a fully automatic combat shotgun developed in 1972 by Maxwell Atchisson. However, the original development by Atchisson seems to have produced only a few guns at prototype-level, with the development that ultimately led to the gun entering the market being done later by Military Police Systems, Inc. The most prominent feature is reduced recoil. The 2005 version was developed 19 years after the patent was sold to Military Police Systems, Inc. The original design later led to the development of several comparable firearms of such utility, including the USAS-12 combat shotgun. The shotgun utilizes fully automatic blowback action as its primary and only mode of fire. However, the relatively low cyclic rate of fire of around 300 rounds per minute enables the shooter to fire individual rounds through the use of short trigger pulls. It is fed from either an 8-round box magazine or 20-round drum magazine. The charging handle is located at the top of the gun and does not reciprocate during firing.

== History ==
In 1987, Max Atchisson sold the rights of the AA-12 to Jerry Baber of Military Police Systems, Inc., Piney Flats, Tennessee. MPS in turn developed the successor simply known as Auto Assault-12 with the help of German-born machinist Boje Cornils, who redesigned the weapon over a period of 19 years with 188 changes and improvements to the original blueprint. Modifications included changing the AA-12 from blowback- to gas-operated with a locked breech. Upon firing a round, around 80% of what would normally be felt as recoil is absorbed by a proprietary gas system. A recoil spring reduces another 10%, leaving the final felt recoil only 10% of the normal 12-gauge round. MPS also teamed up with Action Manufacturing Company and Special Cartridge Company to combine the gun with FRAG-12 High-Explosive ammunition as a multifunction weapon system.

The weapon was lightened to 4.76 kg (10.5 lb) and shortened to 966 mm (38.0 in) but retained the same barrel length. The CQB model has a 13-inch (330 mm) barrel and is half a pound lighter than the regular model. Unlike most other automatic shotguns, the AA-12 fires from an open bolt, a feature more commonly found in submachine guns, as well as heavy and squad-level machine guns. The weapon uses an Advanced Primer Ignition blowback which strikes the shotgun shell when moving forward before placed in-battery (fully chambered), overcoming the forward inertia of the bolt and offering low recoil. It uses 8-round box or 20-round drum magazines, as opposed to the original 5-round box magazine. Due to the abundant use of stainless steel and the designed clearance for fouling, MPS has stated that the weapon requires little to no cleaning or lubrication. The designer states that cleaning is required after 10,000 rounds. A rail system is also available for modern sighting options. Because of an open bolt design, the AA-12 can reportedly operate after being submerged in water.

In 2018, the company Sol Invictus arms introduced a semi-automatic version of the AA-12 for the civilian market, featuring it in the SHOT Show 2019. In late 2019, the Bureau of Alcohol, Tobacco, Firearms and Explosives ordered a recall of civilian AA-12 shotguns produced by BC Engineering (a company owned by Boje Cornils), claiming that the semi-automatic shotgun was a machine gun. As a result Sol Invictus Arms paused the production of their AA-12.

== Usage ==
By 2004, ten firing models of the AA-12 had been produced and were demonstrated to the United States Marine Corps, who did not adopt the weapon.

The Hammer unmanned defense system by More Industries proposed to use dual-mounted AA-12s on the H2X-40 turret. Neural Robotics also wanted to mount the weapon on their AutoCopter unmanned aerial vehicle.

== See also ==
- Armsel Striker
- List of API blowback firearms
- List of shotguns
- Pancor Jackhammer
- Saiga-12
