= Caws (surname) =

Caws is a surname, and may refer to:

- Frank Caws (1846–1905), British architect
- Joan Caws (died 2017), British checkers player
- Mary Ann Caws (born 1933), American author, art historian, and literary critic
- Matthew Caws (born 1967), American lead singer of the band Nada Surf
- Peter Caws (1931–2020), British American philosopher.
