= Combat shotgun =

Shotgun that is intended for use in an offensive role, typically by a military force

Winchester Model 1897 Trench Gun with M1917 bayonet

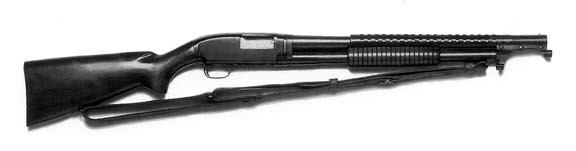
Winchester Model 1912 Trench Gun

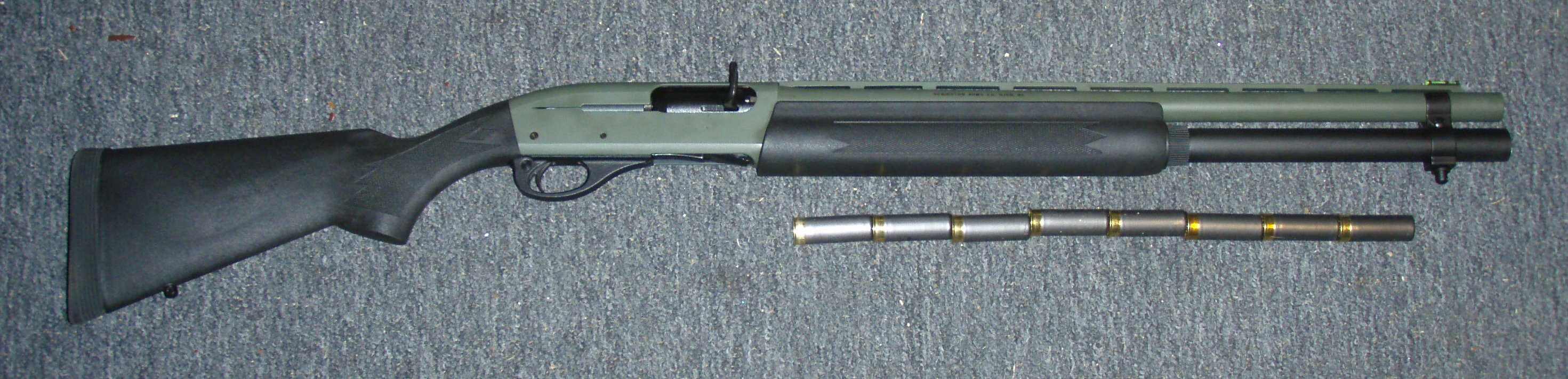
Remington 1100 Tactical Shotgun in 12-gauge—holds eight 2 3/4" rounds in the tube

A combat shotgun is a shotgun issued by militaries for warfare. The earliest shotguns specifically designed for combat were the trench guns or trench shotguns issued in World War I. While limited in range, the multiple projectiles typically used in a shotgun shell increase the probability of hitting a target at close quarters.

== History ==
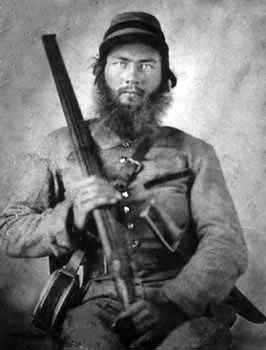
Confederate cavalryman with muzzle-loading shotgun

While the sporting shotgun traces its ancestry back to the fowling piece, which was a refinement of the smoothbore musket, the combat shotgun bears more kinship to the shorter blunderbuss. Invented in the 16th century by the Dutch, the blunderbuss was used through the 18th century in warfare by the British, Austrian, Spanish (like the Escopeteros Voluntarios de Cadiz, formed in 1804, or the Compañía de Escopeteros de las Salinas, among others) and Prussian regiments, as well as in the American colonies. As use of the blunderbuss declined, the United States military began loading smaller lead shot (buckshot) in combination with their larger bullets, a combination known as "buck and ball". The buck and ball load was used extensively by Americans at the Battle of New Orleans in 1814 and was partially responsible for the disparate casualty rates between American and British forces. The advantage of this loading was that it had a greater chance of hitting the enemy, thus taking wounded soldiers out of a fight. The disadvantage of this load was that the buckshot did not cause as severe wounds at longer ranges, and contemporary accounts show many of the British wounded recovering quickly as they had been struck by the buckshot rather than the ball. Fowling pieces were commonly used by militias, for example during the Texas Revolution. However, buck and ball worked as well or better in standard or even rifled muskets. Buck and ball loads were used by both sides of the American Civil War, often by cavalry units.

The development of repeating pump-action shotguns in the 1890s led to their use by the US Marines in the Philippines insurrections and by General "Black Jack" Pershing's pursuit of Pancho Villa, and "riot" shotguns quickly gained favor with civilian police units, but the modern concept of the combat shotgun was fully developed by the American Expeditionary Forces during World War I. The trench gun, as it was called, was a short-barreled pump action shotgun loaded with 6 rounds containing antimony-hardened 00 buckshot, and equipped with a bayonet. The M1897 and M1912 could also be slam fired: the weapon having no trigger disconnector, shells could be fired one after the other simply by working the slide if the trigger was held down, though in the heat of combat one could easily short-stroke the weapon and jam it. When fighting within a trench, the shorter shotgun could be rapidly turned and fired in both directions along the trench axis. The shotguns elicited a diplomatic protest from the German government, claiming the shotguns caused excessive injury, and that any troops found in possession of them would be subject to execution. The US Government rejected the claims, and threatened reprisals in kind if any US troops were executed for possession of a shotgun.

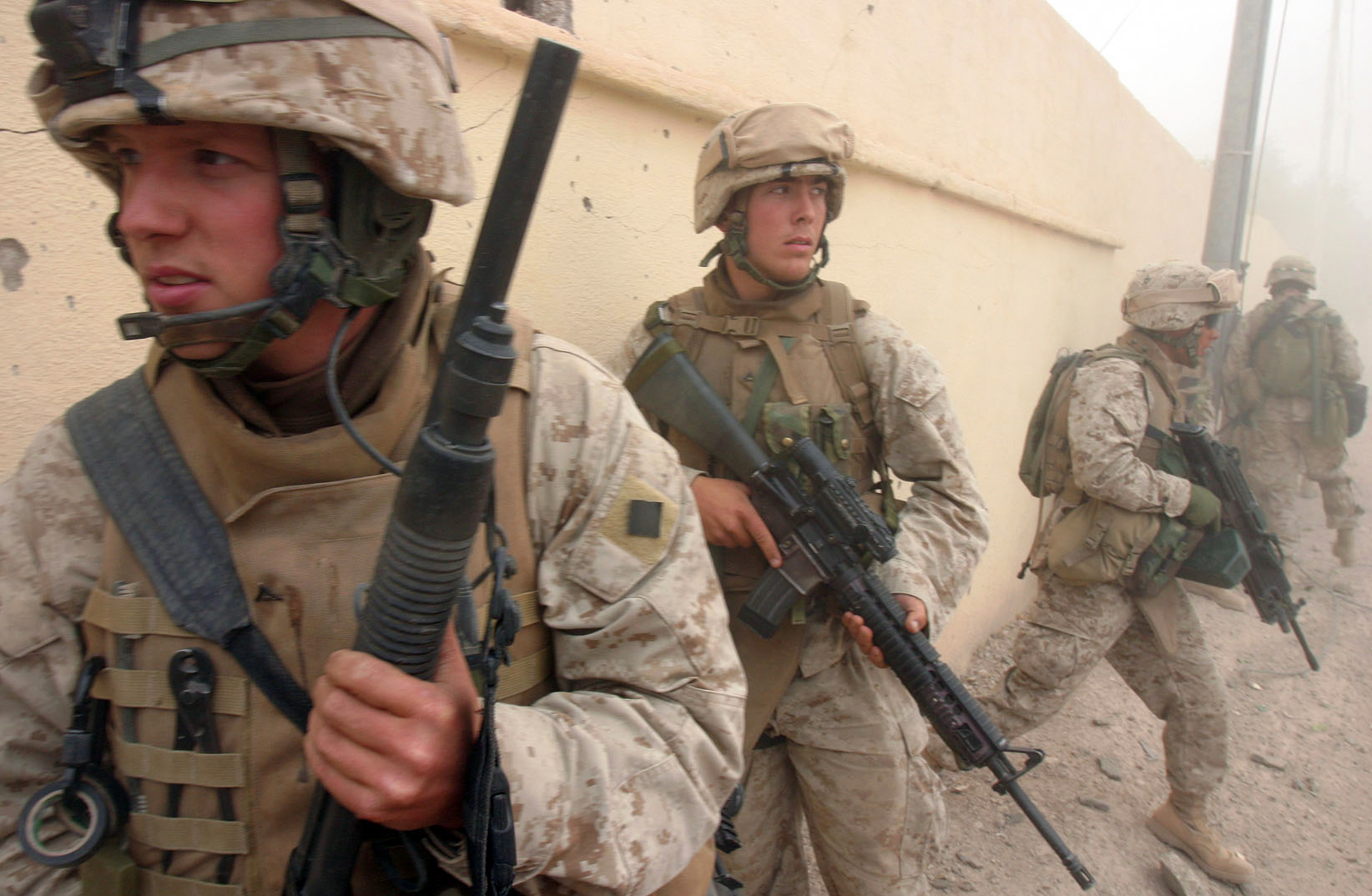
A group of US Marines in Iraq in 2005, armed with a combat shotgun, assault rifle, and squad automatic weapon

The shotgun was used by Allied forces and Allied-supported partisans in all theaters of combat in World War II, and both pump and semi-automatic shotguns are currently issued to all branches of the US military; they have also been used in subsequent conflicts by French, British, Canadian, Australian, and New Zealand forces, as well as many guerrillas and insurgents throughout sub-Saharan Africa, Latin and South America, and Southeast Asia. Six different model of shotguns were accepted in the US army during World War II, the most popular being the M97 and M1912. One disadvantage of using a shotgun in the Pacific Theatre was the way of carrying the shotshells. The standard rifle pouches that carried shotshells were small, only about 30 rounds if carried vertically. Some Marines carried the shells in SL-3 grenade vests from World War I, but these vests were hard to come by. Also used were modified bandoliers and whatever came to hand or could be improvised.

Another disadvantage was paper-hulled shotshells, which would swell when they became damp in a rainy or humid environment, and would not fit into the chamber even after drying out. Commercial paper hulls were later impregnated with wax to make them water resistant, but in combat the heat from rapid firing would cause the wax to melt, often resulting in a jammed gun. Military-issue shotshells were usually made entirely of brass to avoid these issues, until the introduction of plastic hulls in the early 1960s.

General Alexander Patch was seen armed with a Winchester shotgun when he personally led an attack in Guadalcanal.

In the jungle warfare during the Malayan Emergency, the British Army and local forces of Malaya used shotguns to great effect due to limited space in the jungles and frequent close combat. In the Vietnam War, the shotgun was used as an individual weapon in the American army during jungle patrol and urban warfare like the Tet Offensive.

During the Somali conflict in 1992, during Operation Gothic Serpent, the US task forces tested out a new type of Remington shotgun called Ciener Ultimate Over/Under, which was an under-barrel attachment for the standard M16 variants. The idea was for a soldier in an entry team to be able to breach a locked door with the shotgun and then immediately switch to the assault rifle to clear the room. According to the Army Rangers, their verdict was positive for this new type of breaching gun.

In operations in post-invasion Iraq, US forces used their combat shotguns to clear out suspected insurgent hideouts in house to house fighting. One notable experimental shotgun used in limited numbers during Operation Enduring Freedom is the XM26 for breaching doors or close-quarter battle (CQB).

Combat shotguns have seen use in the Russo-Ukrainian War in the anti-drone role although their effectiveness remains unclear.

== Characteristics ==
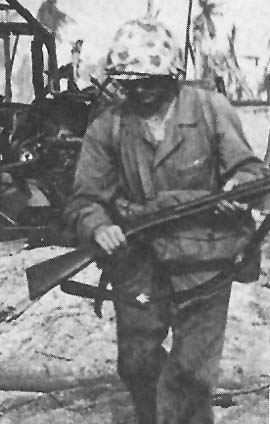
United States Marine carrying a Winchester M97 shotgun

The most common type of shotgun used for this purpose is the manually operated, slide-action/pump-action type like the Remington M870 or Mossberg 590A1. The latter is currently the pump-action of choice for US armed forces, and both have seen service with other militaries. The pump-action type is less prone to malfunction (particularly when dirty) than semi-automatic designs. Pump-action shotguns are also less expensive than their semi-automatic counterparts. Even so, semi-automatic shotguns such as the Benelli M1014 are currently seeing service in NATO-aligned armed forces.

Combat shotguns typically have much shorter barrels than shotguns used for hunting. They usually have magazines of modified design to hold more than the 3 to 5 shots normal with sporting or hunting shotguns. Most combat shotguns have tubular magazines mounted underneath the barrel. These are identical to those of hunting shotguns, except for being longer to hold more ammunition. Some recent designs have detachable box magazines.

Combat shotguns are mostly similar to the police riot shotgun. The military versions may have provisions to mount a bayonet, and may be fitted with ventilated steel or plastic hand guards over the barrel to reduce the danger of a soldier burning their hand on the hot barrel during rapid fire. Riot shotguns are more likely to trade off increased magazine capacity for decreased size. For example, a combat model would be more likely to have a 51 cm (20 in) barrel and up to a 10-round capacity, while riot shotguns are often found with barrels of 35 to 46 cm (14 to 18 in) and a capacity of 5 to 8 rounds.

== Combat use ==
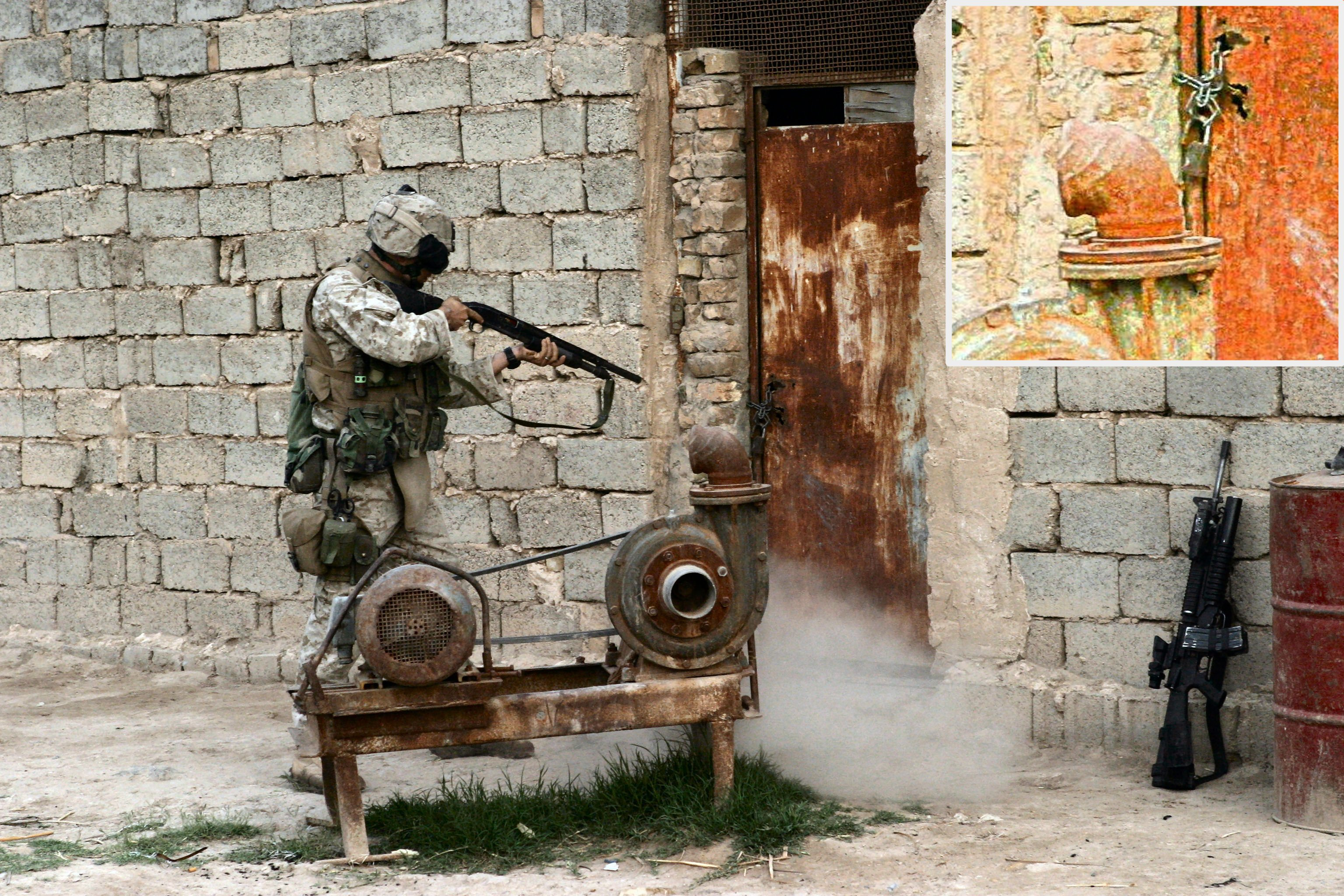
A Mossberg 590 being used by a US Marine for door breaching in Karma, Iraq, in 2005

The combat shotgun has evolved from its original role as a short range combat weapon into a wider role in modern times. With proper configuration, ammunition and training, the modern combat shotgun plays three roles:

1. Offensive weapon
2. Breaching system
3. Less-lethal crowd control

Effective range of the shotgun with standard buckshot is limited to about 20–30 meters. Slug rounds, if available, can extend the effective range of the shotgun to 100 meters (although this is also dependent on the shotgun's sighting system; rifle sights and ghost ring sights will allow the average shooter to effectively engage human-sized targets at considerably greater distances than with a bead sight).

Less lethal rounds vary, with ranges from 10 meters for rubber buckshot to 75 meters for rubber slugs. These less lethal munitions are the same type as used by police, and have served well in riot control situations, such as that in Kosovo in 2001.

When used as a door breaching system, the shotgun may be provided with a muzzle extension to allow it to be pressed firmly against the door while providing the correct standoff distance for optimum performance. While there are specialized rounds for breaching doors with minimal hazard to any occupants of the room, any type of round will do the job, though with some degradation of effectiveness and increased risk of collateral damage. In operations in Iraq, the shotgun was the preferred method of door breaching by infantry units, ideally with a frangible breaching slug. For the breaching role, shorter barrels are preferred, as they are more easily handled in tight quarters.

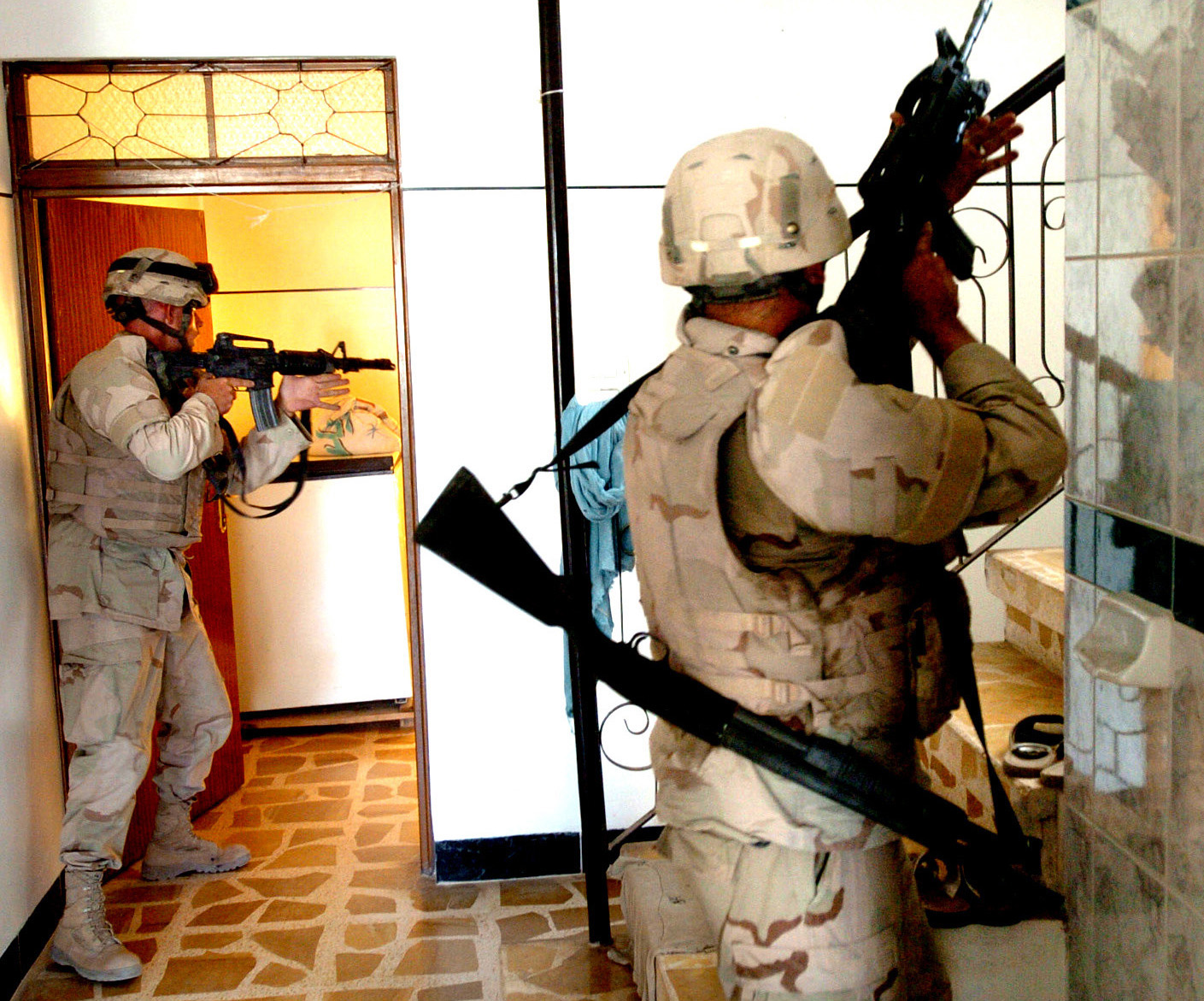
US soldiers in Tal Afar, Iraq, search for insurgents. The soldier in the foreground is carrying a standard M-16 type rifle and a shotgun on a sling for breaching

Limited ammunition capacity is one of the primary downsides of the combat shotgun. While box magazines are available in some models (such as shotgun derivatives of the AK-47 design, like the Saiga-12), the tubular magazine is still dominant. This limits capacities; the current US pump shotgun issued, the Mossberg 590, has a 5 or 8 shot capacity depending on barrel length. The tubular magazine does allow easy "topping off" (a tube-fed pump shotgun can be kept shouldered and aimed at a target and ready to fire while being loaded), so training emphasizes the need to load the magazine to full capacity whenever the opportunity presents itself. A common doctrine is "shoot one, load one": load a shell immediately after every shot (when this does not jeopardize the operator's safety), to ensure that the shotgun is fully loaded at all times; this ensures that the operator has a full magazine at their disposal in case of emergencies when they may not be able to reload in between shots. A pistol is also advised as a backup weapon, should the operator empty the magazine and not have time to reload. A sling to carry the shotgun is essential if it is to be used in conjunction with another weapon, so that the shotgun may be readily accessible.

The bulk and weight of shotgun ammunition also limits its utility as a general-issue weapon. Weight per 100 rounds of an average 12-gauge 00-buck 2 3/4-inch (70 mm) shell is 4.65 kg (10.25 lb); for an average .223/5.56 round, weight per 100 rounds is about 1.22 kg (2.69 lb) or a 3.8:1 weight ratio of 12-gauge buckshot and 5.56×45mm. This means just eight 12-gauge buckshot shells weigh approximately the same (1 lb or 0.45 kg) as thirty 5.56×45mm rifle cartridges. While an individual soldier can easily carry several hundred rifle or pistol cartridges in box magazines, only a few dozen shotshells can be carried practically.

== Effectiveness ==
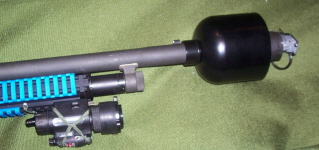
A Mossberg 500 shotgun fitted with a grenade launcher adapter, shown holding a less lethal riot control grenade

A Joint Service Combat Shotgun Program report on the lethality of shotguns in war states, in support of the use of the shotgun in warfare, "the probability of hitting a man-sized target with a shotgun was superior to that of all other weapons", and goes on to support this with statistics compiled by the British from the conflict in Borneo in the 1960s — Operation Claret.

The buckshot typically used in a combat shotgun spreads out to a greater or lesser degree depending on the barrel choke, and can be effective at ranges as far as 70 m (77 yd). The delivery of the large number of projectiles simultaneously makes the shotgun the most effective short range weapon commonly used, with a hit probability 45% greater than a sub-machine gun (using 5-round burst), and twice as great as an assault rifle. While each pellet is only roughly as effective as a small caliber handgun round, and offers very poor penetration against an armored target, the multiple projectiles increases the likelihood of one or more peripheral wounds.

A number of compromises are involved in choosing a shot size:

- Smaller pellets lose velocity more rapidly and penetrate the target less
- Larger pellets means fewer pellets, resulting in a reduced probability of hits
- Heavier loads produce more recoil and greater velocity than lighter loads
- Reduced recoil loads (less shot and/or lower velocity) may produce smaller patterns, which may decrease hit probability

== Ammunition ==
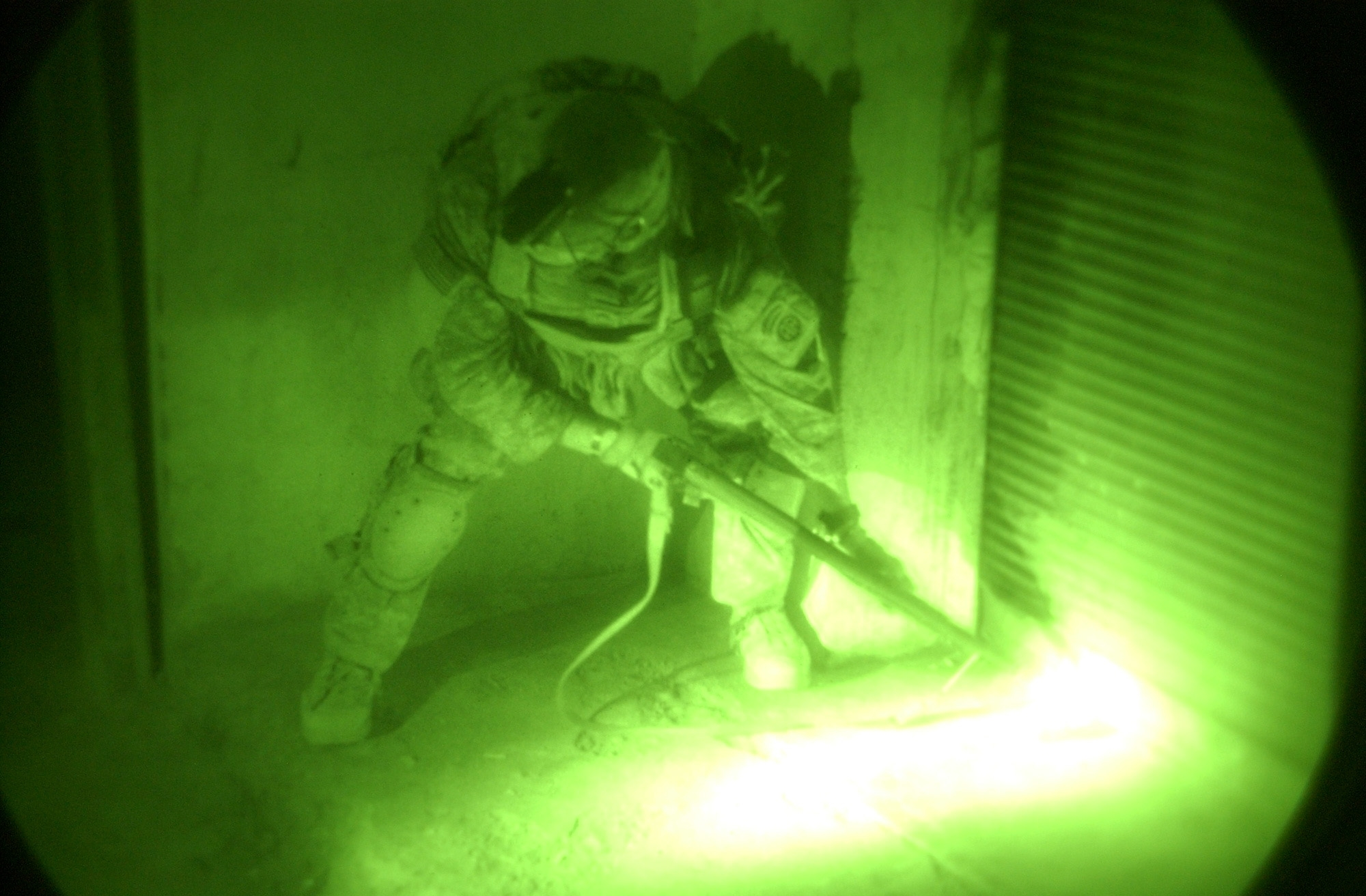
A US soldier in Aksabah, Iraq, uses a pistol-grip shotgun to breach a locked door in a night operation

The most common type of ammunition used in combat shotguns, whether for military or law enforcement purposes, is buckshot, typically a 70 mm (2 3/4 inch) 12-gauge shell loaded with nine hardened 00 buckshot, with a diameter of about 8.4 mm (0.33 in). Buckshot is brutally effective at close ranges against unarmored targets—enough so that Germany issued a protest against its use in 1918. The only other types of ammunition currently in use in military shotguns are breaching rounds, which are either specially designed frangible rounds designed to destroy a door lock or hinge while minimizing the risk of damage to occupants of the room or very light (#9) birdshot, which accomplishes the same purpose. Shotgun slugs are currently under consideration by the US military as an anti-materiel round; the tendency of typical commercial shotgun slugs to deform on impact would render them illegal under the Hague Convention of 1899 and so a jacketed, hardened or sabot slug may be adopted. Less lethal rounds are used by U.S. troops serving as police forces in occupied territory; beanbag and rubber bullet rounds are commonly used to discourage looters and rioters.

In military use, flechette ammunition has also been used in shotguns (primarily by special forces, such as its use by the SEALs in the Vietnam War), but this is not common. Other experimental shotgun ammunition has been created, such as SCMITR, but none have been successful enough to be adopted.

Due to the great flexibility of the shotgun, it is often used in non-offensive roles as well. The US Infantry, for example, offers a number of less lethal varieties of ammunition for use in the riot control role, and for door breaching with #9 birdshot, shotgun slugs, and specialized breaching rounds. Less-lethal options also include the use of grenade launching cups, special launching cartridges and a less-lethal grenade.

There are a number of experimental rounds currently under development and consideration by the US military, including explosive rounds and stand-off breaching rounds, which could further improve the range and flexibility of the combat shotgun.

== Method of operation ==
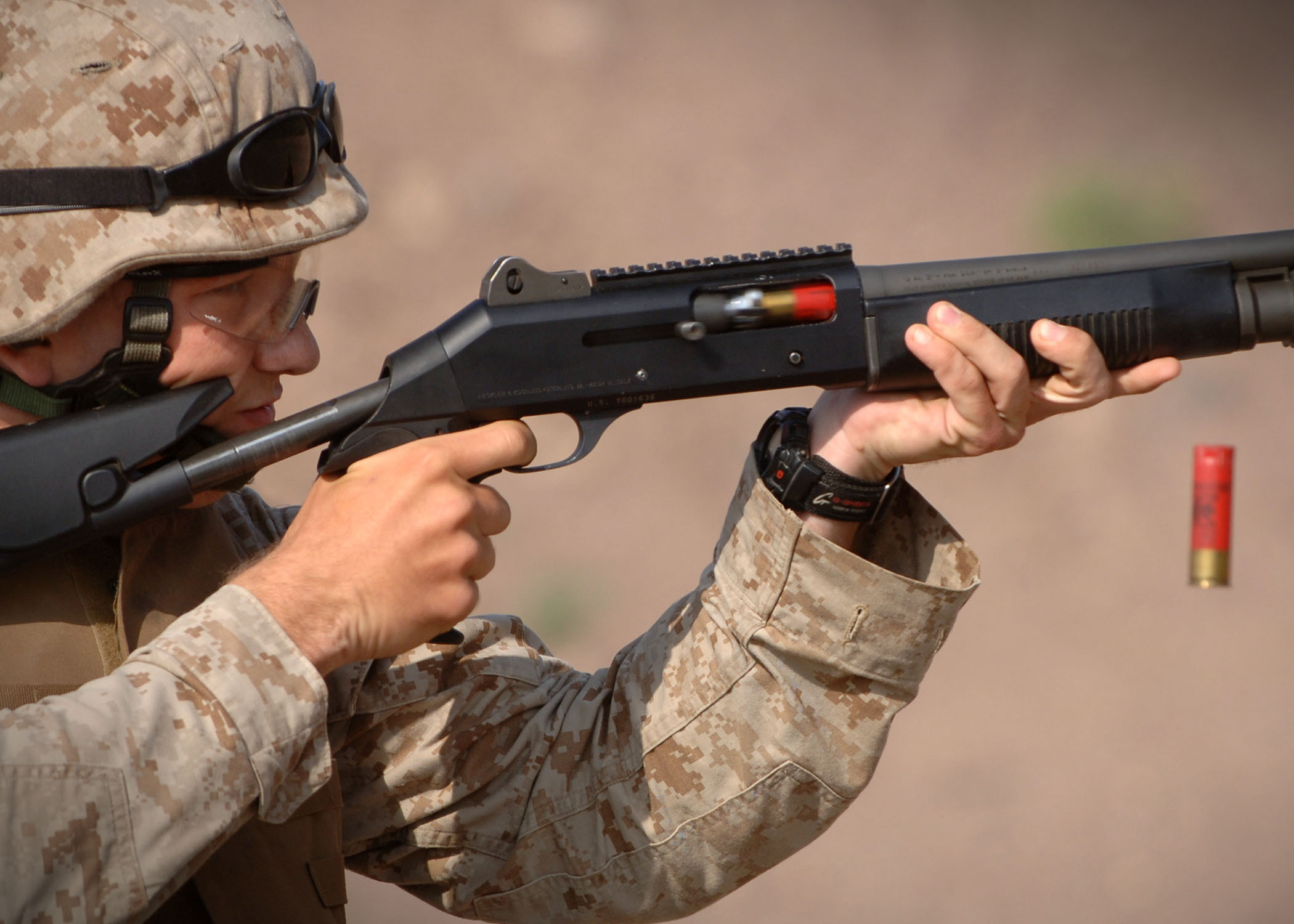
The Benelli M1014, seen in training use in Arta, Djibouti, late 2006

There are two primary modes of operation for combat shotguns, the pump action, and various semi-automatic designs, mostly gas operation and recoil operation designs. The SPAS-12, SPAS-15, and Benelli M3 shotguns, combine the two, offering pump action or, when the pump is locked forwards, autoloading operation. There have also been a few fully automatic shotguns produced such as the AA-12.

The autoloading shotgun (semi or fully automatic) offers a higher rate of fire than a pump shotgun, though controlling a heavy recoiling shotgun in rapid fire is difficult. The autoloading action is more suitable for firing from a prone position, as operation of a pump action moves the elbow normally used to support the shotgun, and it can more effectively be used one-handed, unlike pump actions which require two hands for effective cycling of the action.

The pump shotgun is more versatile than the semiautomatic, as it will fire low powered less lethal munitions which lack sufficient pressure to cycle the action in an autoloading design. A pump shotgun, which does not rely on its ammunition for energy to cycle, operates normally with the lower powered ammunition, and provides utility in combat and riot control situations. In addition, the pump shotgun has an advantage in situations such as door breaching, where the shotgun is immediately dropped (retained by a sling) and replaced by another weapon after the door has been breached. By not cycling the action after firing the final breaching rounds (multiple rounds are often required) the pump shotgun is left without a loaded round in the chamber, unlike a semiautomatic shotgun.

== Use in asymmetric warfare ==
Due to the widespread use of the shotgun as a sporting firearm, it is used in guerrilla warfare and other forms of asymmetric warfare. Che Guevara, in his 1961 book Guerrilla Warfare, notes that shotgun ammunition can be obtained by guerrillas even in times of war, and that shotguns loaded with heavy shot are highly effective against unarmored troop transport vehicles. He recommends that suburban guerrilla bands should be armed with easily concealable weapons, such as handguns and a sawed-off shotgun or carbine. Guevara also mentions an improvised weapon developed by guerrillas consisting of a sawed-off 16-gauge shotgun provided with a bipod to hold the barrel at a 45-degree angle. Called the "M-26", this was loaded with a blank cartridge formed by removing the shot from a standard shotshell. A wooden rod was then placed in the barrel, with a Molotov cocktail attached to the front. This formed an improvised mortar capable of firing the incendiary device accurately out to a range of 100 meters.

== See also ==
- List of combat shotguns
- List of individual weapons of the U.S. Armed Forces
- List of shotguns
- Lupara
