= Drum magazine =

Extended capacity magazine for firearms

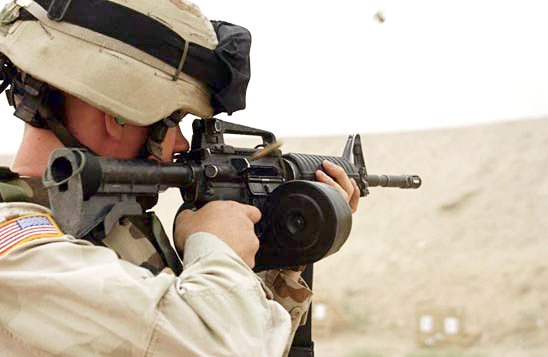
An example of a Beta C-Mag double drum design in use on the M4A1 Carbine

A drum magazine is a cylindrical firearm magazine with a shape that enables it to hold more cartridges than a typical box magazine, which stores rounds in stacks. In a conventional drum, cartridges lie parallel to the drum's axis and follow a curved path toward the feed lips. The term is also sometimes applied to pan magazines, in which cartridges are arranged radially around the center. The capacity of drum magazines varies, but is generally between 50 and 100 rounds.

== Design and operation ==
A conventional drum stores cartridges along a track that coils inward towards the feed lips, while a double or saddle drum has two circular bodies that are both connected to a common feedway. A pan magazine is flatter, with cartridges pointing inward toward the center. For all three types of drums, their capacity depends upon on both the diameter of the drum and the number of cartridge layers.

Drum magazines can accommodate more cartridges while still keeping the magazine profile low, but their circular shape takes up volume and makes them awkward to carry. Most drums use an internal spring, as in a box magazine, to move cartridges toward the feed opening. In some spring-driven drums, the spring can be wound up, allowing the drum to be refilled with ammunition. The Lewis gun's pan has no magazine spring: the firearm's mechanism rotates the pan to bring cartridges into position. This avoids a spring in the pan but requires additional, complicated feed parts to be built into the gun. The design complications of box-type magazines are shared with drum magazines, accentuated to a higher degree. The circular shape of the magazine makes orienting the round to feed even more difficult, while the higher capacity of drums necessitates a correspondingly stronger spring.

In some firearms, they can increase magazine capacity while still retaining the magazine mechanism, providing interchangeability with box magazines for role flexibility. However, drum magazines are bulkier, more expensive, and harder to reload, making their adoption in infantry roles rare. For machine-guns, if more capacity is desired, the transition is usually to belt-feed mechanisms.

== History and usage ==
=== 1800s ===
In 1853, the first revolving drum magazine was patented by Charles N. Tyler, and the first modern one by William H. Elliot, better known as the inventor of the Remington Double Derringer, in 1871. In describing his invention Elliot wrote that his object was to provide not only a detachable magazine, but one "of much greater capacity than it could have if it were a part of the [firearm]".

=== 1900s ===
==== Pistols and rifles ====
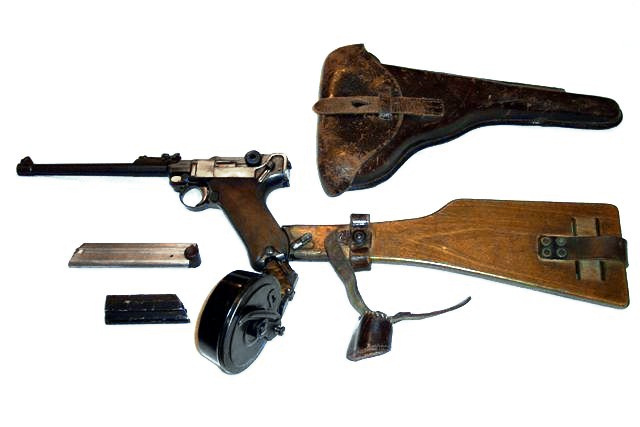
A Luger "artillery" pistol with a 32-round drum

A drum magazine was built for the Luger (Pistole 1908) pistol; although the Luger usually used an 8-cartridge box magazine, the optional 32-cartridge Schneckenmagazine ("snail magazine") was also sometimes used.

Moubray G. Farquhar and Arthur H. Hill applied for a British patent for "A New or Improved Cartridge Magazine for Small Arms and Machine Guns" in 1915 for a drum magazine for their Farquhar–Hill rifle, and it was accepted in 1919. Farquhar and Hill wrote that their invention's principal object was "to enable the magazines of fire arms and machine guns to carry a larger number of cartridges than is usual."

==== Submachine guns ====
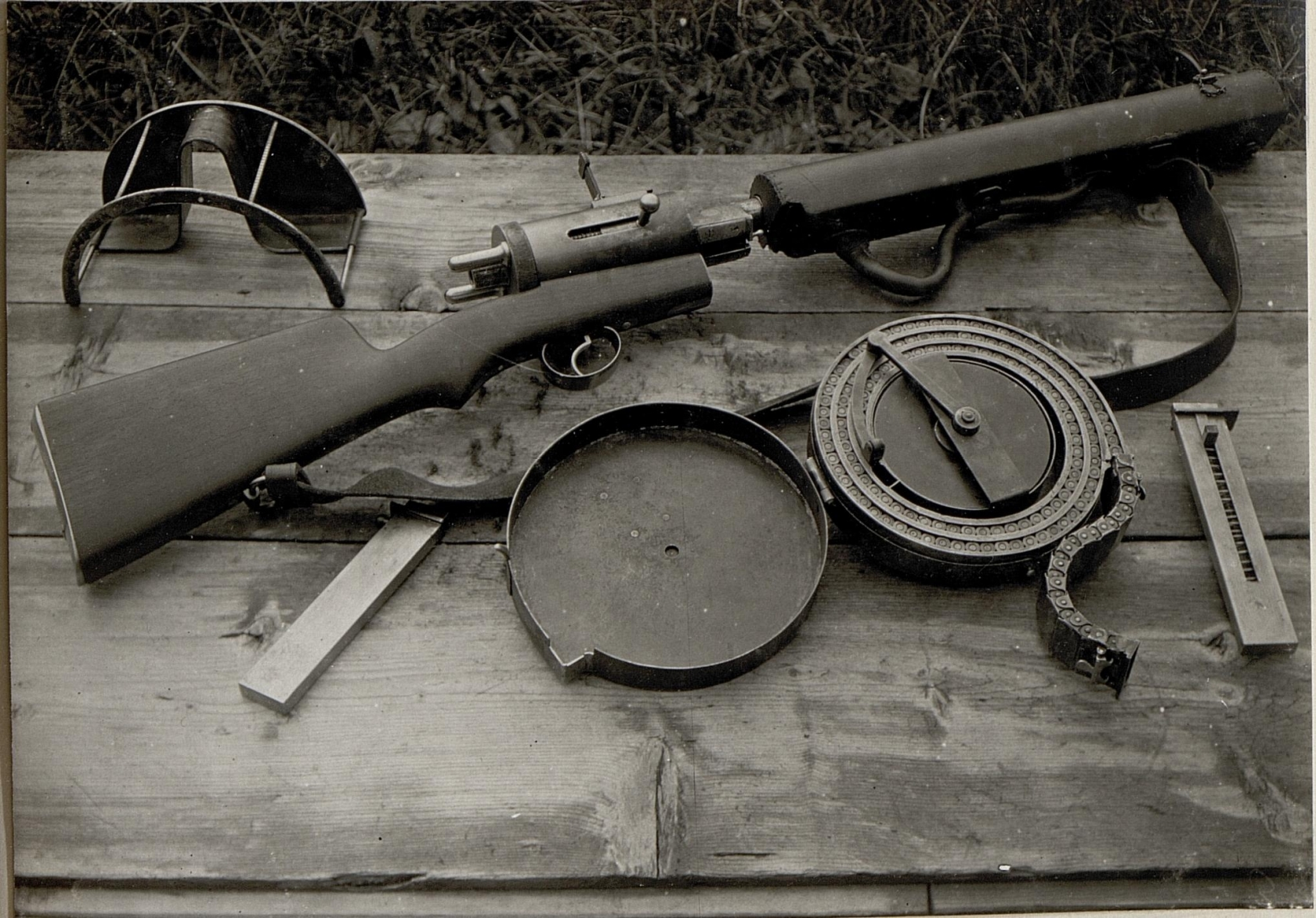
The Standschütze Hellriegel M1915 used a drum magazine (incorporating a linked belt) and a water-cooled barrel.

In 1915, the Standschütze Hellriegel M1915 (German: Maschinengewehr des Standschützen Hellriegel, "Machine gun from reservist Hellriegel"), an Austro-Hungarian water-cooled submachine gun, was produced during World War I in very limited prototype numbers.

The Soviet PPD submachine gun originally designed in 1934 by Vasily Degtyaryov could use either a 35-round box magazine, or a 71-round drum magazine copied from the Finnish Suomi KP/-31 submachine gun. The Suomi however, used 9x19mm Parabellum instead, and the latter magazine was most common. The Soviet PPSh-41 and PPS-43 were submachine guns, which replaced the PPD were cheaper and more reliable weapons designed in 1941 and 1943, respectively. They too used 7.62×25mm Tokarev ammunition, could use either a 35-round box magazine or a 71-round drum magazine, and the latter was most common.

The Thompson submachine gun ("Tommy gun") used a drum magazine in its classic form, but the drum magazines for this weapon were abandoned on the World War II models. The M1921 Thompsons could accommodate either 20-round box magazines or 50-round cylindrical drum magazines; the latter were known as "L drums" because "L" is the Latin numeral for 50. A 100-round "C drum" magazine (the letter standing for the Roman numeral for 100) was available, but weighed more than eight pounds and pushed the total weight of the gun to almost 20 pounds (9.1 kg). The M1928 Navy and M1928A1 variants, used by the US Navy and US Marine Corps, could also accept drum magazines, but standard box magazines were more popular due to the drum magazines' weight and tendency to jam.

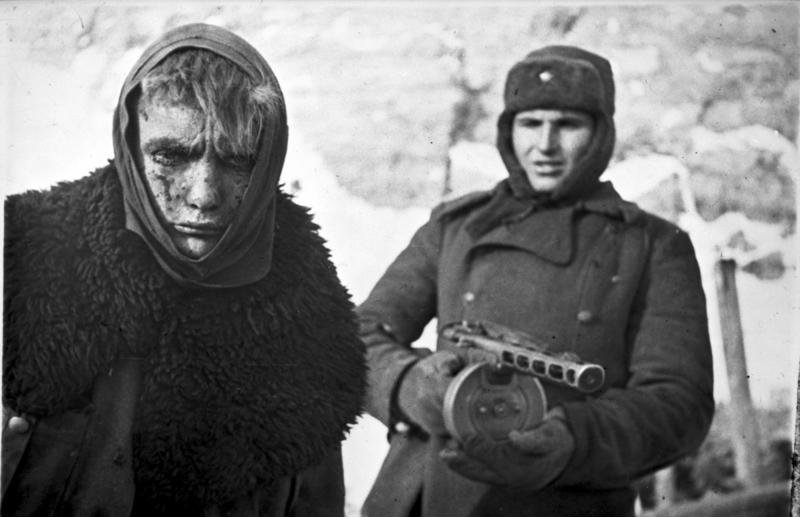
Red Army soldier armed with a drum-equipped PPSh-41 marches a German soldier into captivity after the Battle of Stalingrad, 1943.

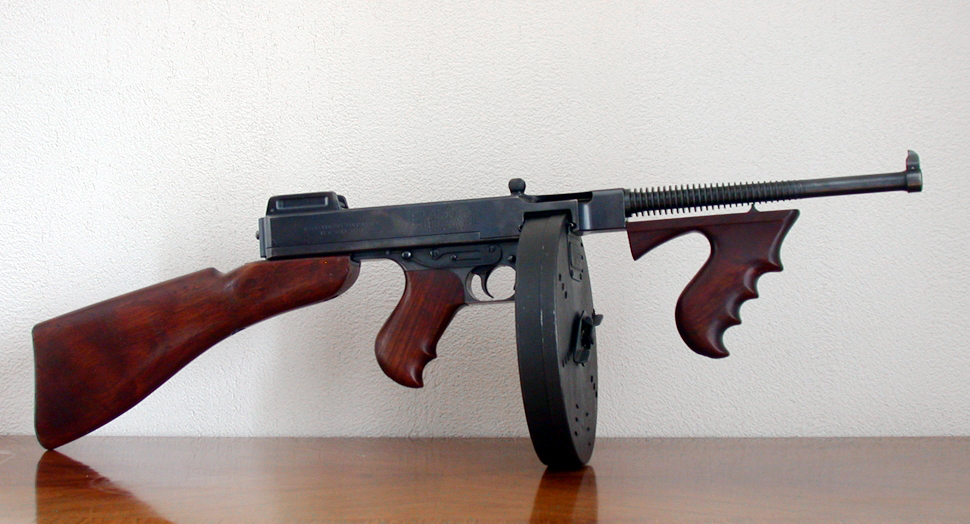
Thompson with 100-round drum

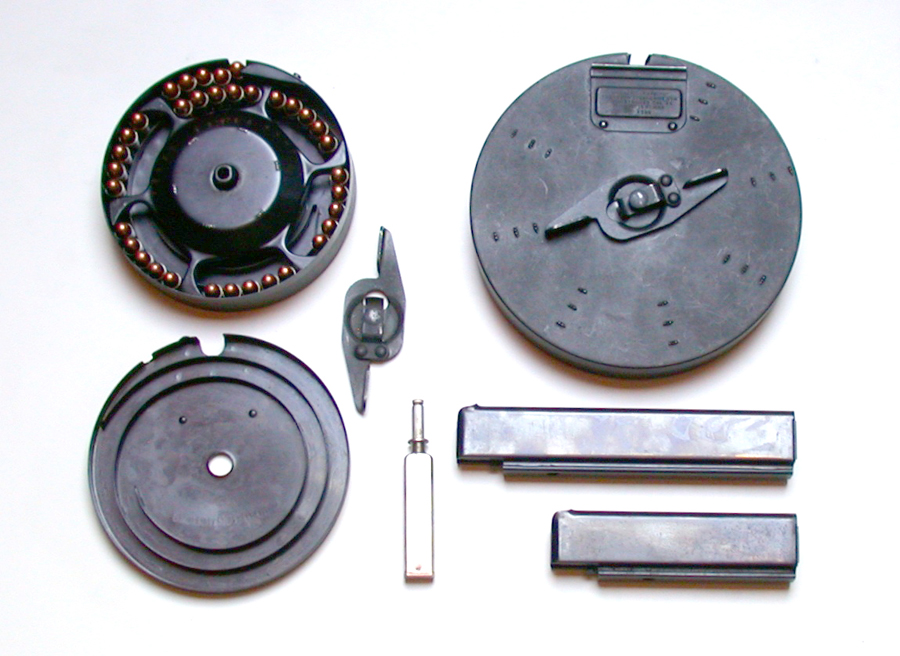
50- and 100-round drum magazines plus 20- and 30-round box magazines for Thompson SMG

==== Machine guns ====
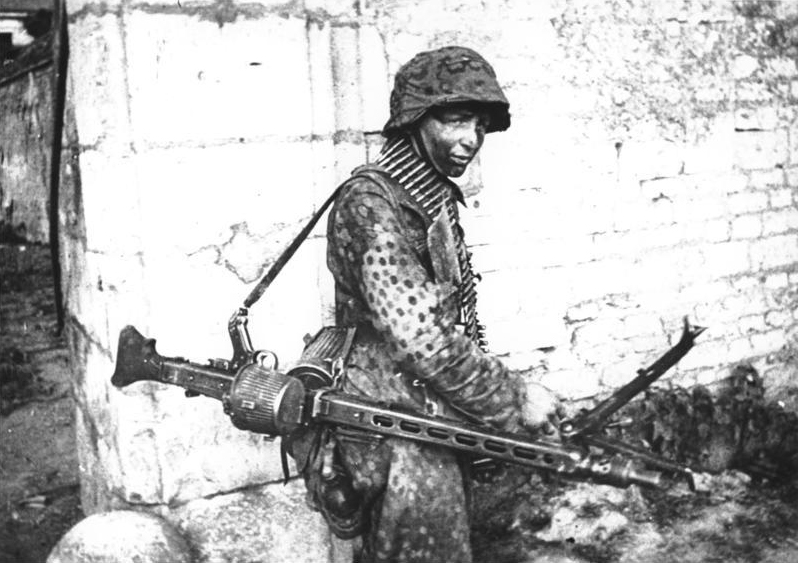
A German Waffen SS soldier from 12th SS Panzer Division "Hitlerjugend" with a belt drum-equipped MG-42 machine gun.

An example of a machine gun with an optional belt drum magazine, containing a starter tab and 50-round length coil of ammunition belt, is the MG 42 (shortened from German: Maschinengewehr 42, or "machine gun 42"), a 7.92×57mm Mauser general-purpose machine gun designed in Nazi Germany and used extensively by the Wehrmacht and the Waffen-SS during the second half of World War II. The 50-round Gurttrommel (belt drum) was also used by the preceding MG 34 general purpose machine gun. Designed to be low-cost and easy to build, the MG 42 proved to be highly reliable and easy to operate. It is most notable for its very high cyclic rate for a gun using full power service cartridges, averaging about 1,200 rounds per minute compared to around 850 for the MG 34, and perhaps 450 to 600 for other common machine guns such as the M1919 Browning or Bren.

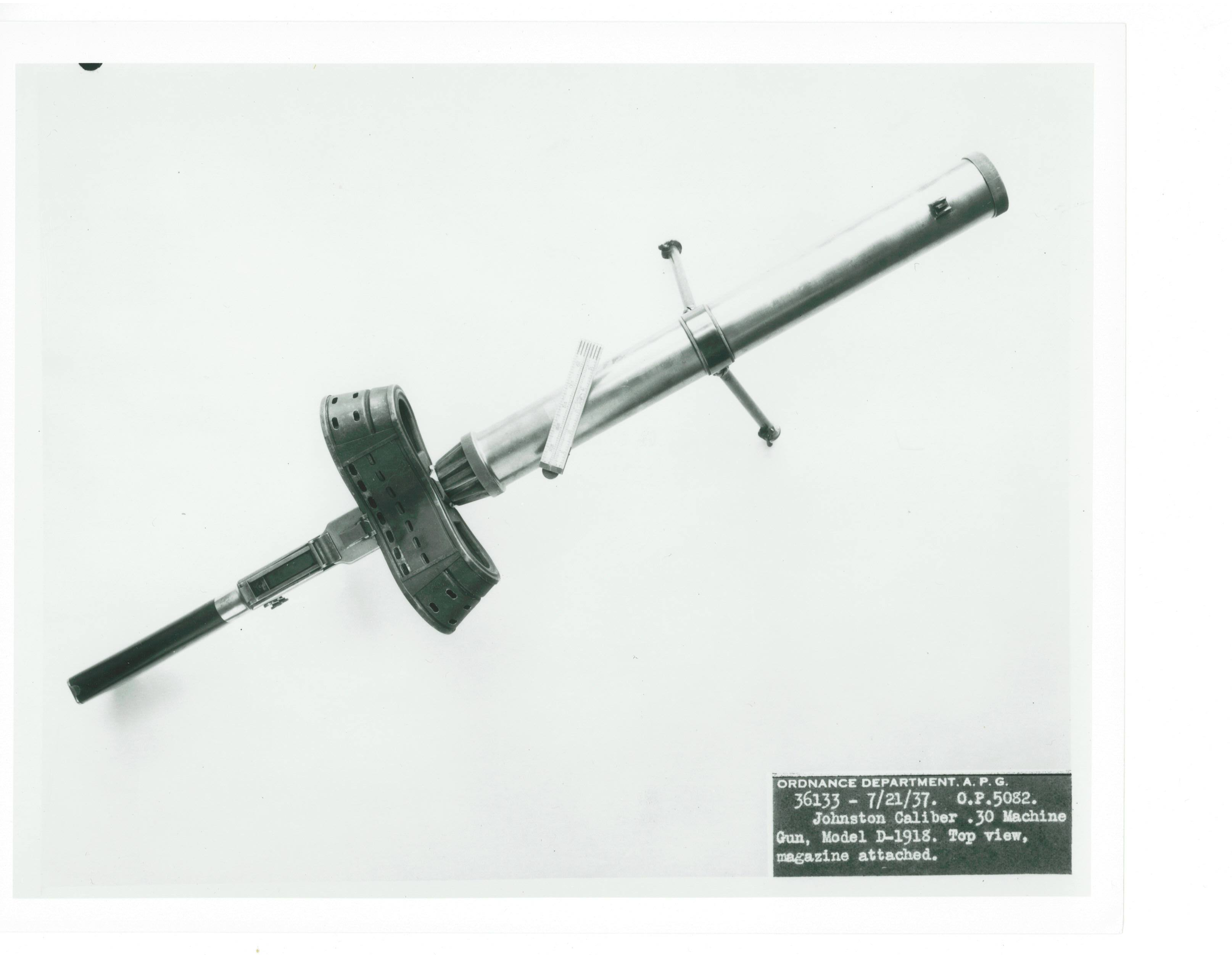
Johnston light machine gun with a double drum magazine

==== Pan magazines ====
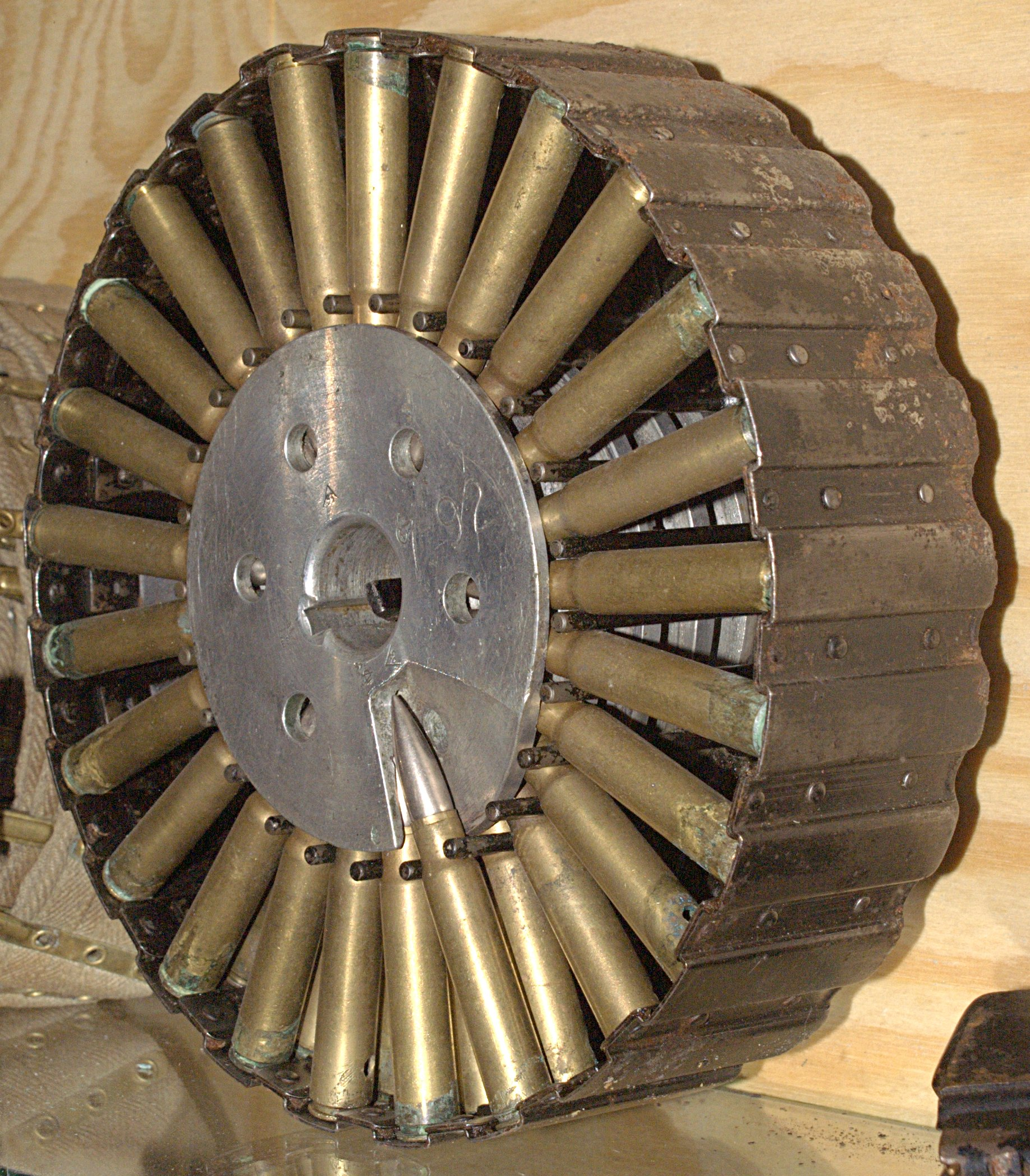
Pan magazine as used on a 7.92mm Lewis gun. It is shown on its side here, but it is mounted with the flat bottom of the pan on top of the weapon.

Pan magazines (also called "disc magazines") are also often referred to as a drum magazine. The pan magazine differs from other drum magazines in that the cartridges are stored perpendicular to the axis of rotation, rather than parallel, and are usually mounted on top of the firearm. This type is used on the Lewis gun, Vickers K, Bren gun (only used in anti-aircraft mountings), Degtyaryov light machine gun, and American-180 submachine gun. A highly unusual example was found on the Type 89 machine gun fed from two 45-round quadrant-shaped pan magazines (each magazine had a place for nine 5-round stripper clips).

Media related to Pan magazines at Wikimedia Commons

==== Beta C-Mag ====
Schematic illustrations of a Beta C-magazine filled with 100 cartridges.

Double drum magazine empty.

The Beta C-Mag is a twin-drum, extended capacity magazine that accepts up to 100 rounds of ammunition. First patented in 1987 and manufactured by the Beta Company, it has been adapted for use in numerous firearms firing 5.56×45mm NATO, 7.62×51mm NATO, and 9×19mm Parabellum cartridges. At the time of closing its business, the Beta Company described the C-Mag as "the original high-capacity magazine." It had sold the magazine internationally for 37 years to law enforcement, militaries, and civilian firearm hobbyists.

=== 21st century ===
By 2013, drum magazines were available for firearms including AK-pattern rifles, firearms using STANAG magazines, and the Heckler & Koch MP5. A 2019 report in The Wall Street Journal described improvements in design and manufacturing that had made drum magazines less costly and more reliable, contributing to their availability in the United States civilian market.

Drum magazines have also figured in mass shootings in the United States, drawing public attention to magazine capacity. A 100-round drum was used in the rifle used in the 2012 Aurora theater shooting, which jammed, causing the shooter to switch to a different weapon. A 100-round double-drum magazine was used in the 2019 Dayton shooting, and police found an empty 60-round drum-style magazine at the scene of the 2022 Colorado Springs nightclub shooting.
