= Stevens Model 77E =

- Type: Shotgun
- Place of origin: United States

Service history
- In service: 1963-Present
- Used by: Army of the Republic of Vietnam; United States Army; United States Marine Corps
- Wars: Vietnam War

Production history
- Manufacturer: Stevens Arms
- Produced: 1963
- No. built: 69,700

Specifications
- Barrel length: 20 in (51 cm)
- Caliber: 12-gauge
- Action: Pump-action
- Feed system: internal tube magazine

The Stevens Model 77E was a pump-action shotgun offered in 12 gauge, 16 gauge, 20 gauge, 28 gauge, and .410 bore. The military version 77E was the most widely used shotgun of the Vietnam War. It was a short-barreled pump-action shotgun known variously as the "trench" or "riot" shotgun in 12 gauge. The Military Model 77E had a noticeably shorter stocks than similar United States military shotguns built by Ithaca Gun Company, Remington Arms, and Winchester Repeating Arms Company. These short stocks were intended to accommodate South Vietnamese soldiers, and the Military Model 77E was the first United States combat shotgun equipped with a rubber recoil pad. Military Model 77E shotguns were Parkerized with sling swivels and wooden stocks. Receivers were marked "U.S." and "p" proofmarks appeared on both barrels and receivers.

A few prototypes were fitted with bayonet adapters, but none are known to have been issued. A few Stevens Model 69R shotguns also saw service during the Vietnam War. The Model 77E gave satisfactory service, but proved less durable than the Ithaca Model 37. Breakage at the point of attachment of the buttstock to the receiver was the most common complaint.

== Users ==
- Cuba
- France
- Hong Kong
- India
- Israel
- Japan
- South Korea
- Myanmar
- Nepal
- Qatar
- Rwanda
- Somalia
- South Africa
- Thailand
- United States
- South Vietnam
- North Vietnam
