= Colt ring lever rifles =

Colt ring lever rifle
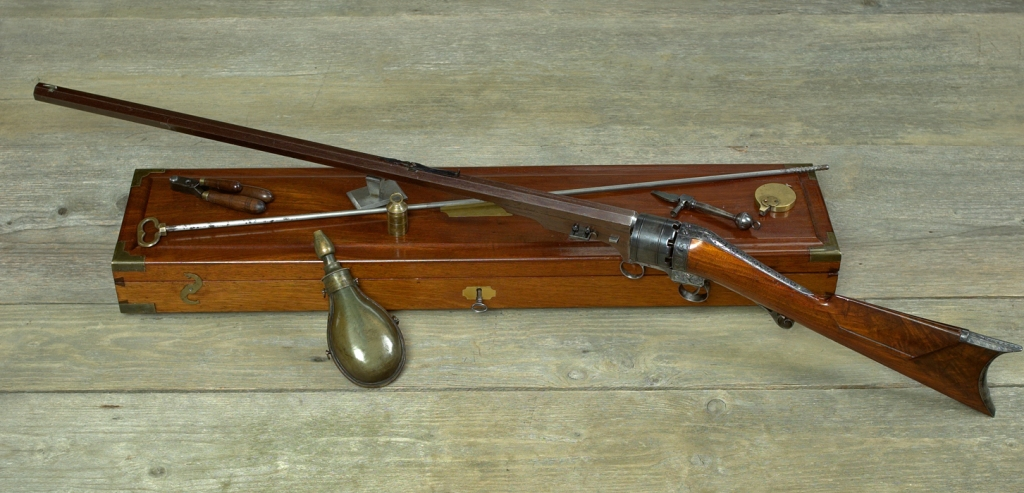
- A rifle with the full kit of accessories
- Type: Rifle
- Place of origin: United States

Service history
- Used by: United States Army; Texas Navy
- Wars: Second Seminole War

Production history
- Designer: Samuel Colt
- Manufacturer: Patent Arms Manufacturing Company
- Produced: 1837–1838 (first model); 1838–1841 (second model)
- No. built: 200 (first model); 500 (second model)

Specifications
- Barrel length: 28 in (71 cm) or 32 in (81 cm) (first model 32 in only)
- Caliber: .34, .36, .38, .40, and .44 (second model .44 caliber only)
- Action: Single-action
- Rate of fire: 8 shots per minute
- Feed system: 8-round cylinder

The Colt first model ring lever rifle and Colt second model ring lever rifle are two early caplock revolving rifles that were produced by the Patent Arms Manufacturing Company between 1837 and 1841. The first model, produced between 1837 and 1838, was the first firearm manufactured by Samuel Colt, developed shortly before the advent of the Colt Paterson revolver. The first model was succeeded by the second model, produced between 1838 and 1841, which featured minor variations in design and construction. Both models are distinguished from later Colt revolving long-arms by the presence of a small ring lever located in front of the trigger. This lever, when pulled, would index the cylinder to the next position and cock the internal hidden hammer. Although complicated in design and prone to failures, fifty first model rifles were ordered by the U.S. Army for use against Seminole warriors in the Second Seminole War.

== Overview ==
=== First model ===
The first model ring lever rifle features a 32-inch (81 cm) octagonal barrel with a browned finish. The finishes of the other metal parts are blued. The rifle features a circular trigger guard, which lies behind the ring lever. The ring-shaped lever is used by the operator to both cock the internal hammer and rotate the cylinder (as opposed to cocking an external hammer on later single-action revolvers). The first model was offered in .34, .36, .38, .40, and .44 calibers with an eight-shot revolving cylinder, though ten-shot examples were produced in very limited numbers. The cylinder features a roll engraving depicting a deer hunted by a centaur and a group of horsemen. The front and rear edges of the cylinder were originally square, though later improvements yielded a rounded rear cylinder edge. These improvements also included the addition of a cutout in the recoil shield to enable capping the nipples without disassembly and the addition of a loading lever. The rifle features a walnut stock with crescent buttplate and a raised cheekpiece featuring an inlaid image of four horse-heads. The first model is distinguished by the presence of a top strap located over the cylinder, a feature absent from nearly all successive Colt revolvers until the development of the Colt Single Action Army in 1873.

=== Second model ===
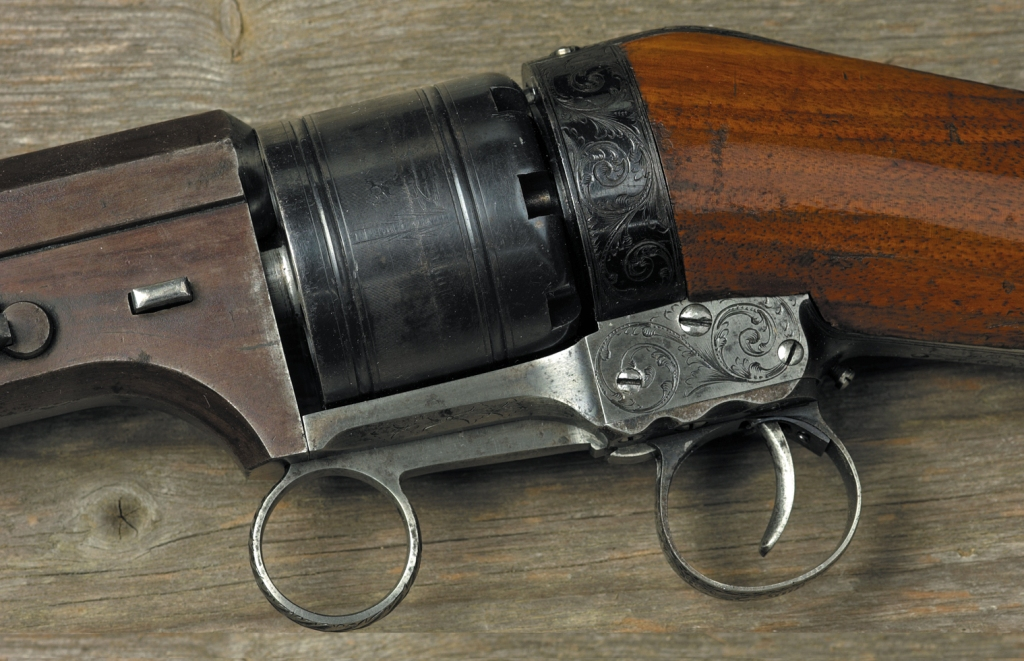
Colt Paterson ring lever rifle

Although the second model ring lever rifle is identical in operation to the first model, minor differences in appearance are apparent. Most notably, the second model lacks the top strap included on the first model, opting instead for an open top design. The second model also lacks the inlaid image on the cheekpiece, but includes an image of a house in the roll cylinder engraving not present in the first model. In similar fashion to the first model, improvements were made to the second model during production to include the addition of a loading lever, the rounding of the rear cylinder edge, and the addition of a capping notch in the recoil shield. The second model was only offered in .44 caliber, but was offered in both 28-inch (71 cm) and 32-inch (81 cm) barrel lengths (though the 28 inch barrel was less common). As with the first model, eight-shot cylinders were standard; only a small number of ten-shot cylinders were manufactured.

== Production ==
Production of the first model ring lever rifle began in 1837 in the Patent Arms Manufacturing Company's factory in Paterson, New Jersey. The first model ring lever rifle was Samuel Colt's first manufactured firearm, and was followed shortly thereafter in late 1837 by the introduction of the Colt Paterson pistol. The first model remained in production until 1838, with a total of about 200 firearms manufactured (serial numbers 1 through 200). In 1838, the second model ring lever rifle began production and continued until 1841, with a total of about 500 manufactured (serial numbers 1 through 500). Because only a small number of the ring lever rifles were manufactured, they are considered rare finds among all Colt firearms, with the first model being the rarest firearm produced under the Patent Arms Manufacturing Company.

== Reception and use ==
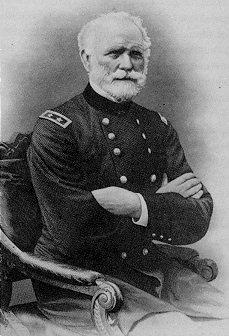
William S. Harney, a proponent of Colt's ring lever rifles

Although neither the First nor second model ring lever rifles saw widespread adoption by any military organization, several were procured by the United States Army and the Texas Navy. After an unfavorable review by Army officials in September 1837, which reported that Colt's first model ring lever rifle was prone to failure and too complicated for combat service, a second review was conducted in March 1838. At the request of Lieutenant Colonel William S. Harney of the Second Dragoon Regiment, Colt traveled to Florida with 100 ring lever rifles for the review. During the trial, officers of the second dragoons reported favorably on Colt's rifles after they conducted several experiments that demonstrated that the first model ring lever rifle was equal or superior to conventional arms in accuracy, penetration, rapidity of fire, resistance to weather, and safety. The experiments found that the ring lever rifle could fire off sixteen shots in thirty-one seconds, with the ability to load and fire an eight-shot cylinder in forty-eight seconds. This board of officers advocated equipping select trained men in each company with Colt's rifle, fearing universal employment may cause damage to the guns because of their delicate construction. As the board was conducting its experiments, several friendly Indians had gathered to watch and described Colt's rifle as "great medicine." With the success of the tests, Army Bvt. Major General Thomas Jesup agreed to outfit a section of the second dragoons with fifty first model rifles for use during the Second Seminole War. The purchase gave Colt a total of $6,250, or $125 per rifle.

The availability of multiple shots offered by Colt's rifle was seen as an advantage against the Seminole warriors, who had learned the vulnerability of troops who had already fired the conventional single-shot military arms of the day. Reports of use in combat illustrated the delicate and complicated construction of the rifles, which easily put them out of service. Although the guns were not perfect and prone to defect, the use of the new weapons against the Seminoles yielded significant gains. In 1839, nearly a year after acquiring fifty first model rifles, Colonel Harney remarked that all but two were in good working order. Later in July 1839, however, a surprise Seminole attack led to the loss of thirty ring lever rifles, though fourteen were eventually recovered. In spite of the rifle's reliability problems, support for Colt's rifles was garnered from field officers, especially from Lieutenant Colonel Harney. Harney commented on Colt's ring lever rifle favorably, stating: "I honestly believe that, but for these arms, the Indians would now be luxuriating in the Everglades of Florida."

Colt capitalized on Harney's testimony to produce a report featuring the endorsement and various statistics about the ring lever rifles. Endorsements for Colt's ring lever rifles came from other sources as well, including First Sergeant P. W. Henry of Harney's second dragoons who drilled soldiers in the use of the revolving rifles. Henry claimed that when "passing through Indian country, I always felt myself safer with one of your rifles in my hands, than if I was attended by a body of ten or fifteen men armed with the common musket or carbine." In spite of the personal endorsements Colt gathered, he received no more contracts for ring lever rifles from the U.S. Army. In 1839, however, after difficulty in selling arms to state governments, 100 ring lever rifles were ordered by the Texas Navy.

Aside from military use, Florida presented another market for Colt's ring lever rifles in 1840. In a letter from Charles Downing, Delegate to Congress from the Florida Territory, to Waddy Thompson, chairman of the U.S. House of Representatives' Committee on Military Affairs, Downing requested the procurement of 500 Colt ring lever rifles for distribution to frontier settlers in Florida. Downing recognized the advantage of Colt's ten-shot rifles, and desired to arm settlers with these rifles in order that they may effectively defend themselves and their families against attacks by the Seminoles. In his letter, Downing states that "no man in Florida is safe in his own house" and that military protection by the U.S. Army was ineffective. In Downing's opinion, Colt's ring lever rifles were the solution, as they were "superior to twenty ordinary rifles" (with an extra ten-shot cylinder) and "superior to ten men" armed with conventional weapons. The price given for the 500 rifles was between $40 and $45 each, or a total of around $20,000. It is clear that Downing refers to Colt's ring lever rifles, as these were Colt's only models featuring ten-shot cylinders, and it is most likely that these rifles would be second model rifles as the letter's 1840 date was within the production range of the second model and Downing refers to the rifles as "improved". Although such a transaction would represent significant business for Colt, it appears that the House of Representatives took no action on this proposal, as documents do not mention a purchase of this magnitude by the U.S. Government.

Although government sales were poor with Colt's ring lever rifles, Colt had more success with his model 1839 carbine. This model, produced from 1838 to 1841, lacked a ring lever and featured a more familiar external hammer. Approximately 950 model 1839 carbines were manufactured, of which 180 were purchased by the Texas Navy and 360 were purchased by the United States Navy. Still, sales were weaker than expected, leading to the closing of the Patent Arms Manufacturing Company in 1842. Samuel Colt would not produce firearms again until collaboration with Samuel Walker resulted in production of the Colt Walker revolver around 1847.

== See also ==
- Colt revolving rifle
