= Military 12-gauge cartridges =

Military use of combat shotgun cartridges

12-gauge
- Type: Shotgun

Specifications
- Overall length: 2.75 inches (7.0 cm)

Military use of combat shotguns through the 20th century has created a need for ammunition maximizing the combat effectiveness of such weapons within the limitations of international law. 12-gauge has been widely accepted as an appropriate bore diameter to provide an effective number of projectiles within an acceptable recoil. Early 12-gauge popularity for sporting purposes produced a large number of repeating firearms designs readily adaptable to military purposes.

== United States ==
While shotguns had been used in earlier conflicts, the trench warfare of World War I demonstrated a need for standardized weapons and ammunition. Initial issue with each shotgun was one hundred commercial-production paper-cased shotgun shells containing nine 00 buckshot pellets 0.33 inches (8.4 mm) in diameter. These cartridges became wet in the muddy trench warfare environment; and swelled paper cases would no longer chamber reliably. Full-length brass cartridges proved more resistant to moist field conditions and the repeated loading and unloading during patrols and watches when no ammunition was fired. Some of these early brass cartridges had an unusual saw-tooth crimp.

=== M19 ===
World War II production of full-length brass cartridges containing 00 buckshot was designated Shell, shotgun, brass, 12 gauge, No. 00 buckshot, M19.

=== M162 ===
Plastic shotgun shells devised following World War II were equally durable and water resistant as the earlier brass cartridges and had the additional advantages of corrosion resistance and lower cost. Initial production for the Vietnam War loaded 00 buckshot into the same red plastic cases being used for sporting ammunition and was designated: Shell, shotgun, plastic case, 12 gauge, No. 00 buck, XM162. The shells were typically packaged as twelve ten-round cardboard boxes within a metal ammunition box.

=== M257 ===
Combat experience in Vietnam suggested two improvements. Heavy bullet preferences dating back to the Philippine–American War were re-evaluated considering combat experience with the 5.56×45mm NATO cartridge, and advantages of a larger number of smaller No. 4 buckshot pellets were evident for some situations. These loadings were designated: Shell, shotgun, plastic case, No. 4 buck, special, XM257. Initial production was in the same red plastic cases, but the visibility advantage for sporting use was a liability in jungle warfare; so later production used cases of a subdued green color.

=== Flechettes ===
Plastic cases loaded with small steel darts called "flechettes" were issued on a limited trial basis during the Vietnam war. Cartridges manufactured by Western Cartridge Company contained twenty flechettes 18.5 millimetres (0.73 in) long and weighing 7.3 grains (0.47 g) each. The flechettes were packed in a plastic cup with granulated white polyethylene to maintain alignment with the bore axis, and supported by a metal disk to prevent penetration of the over-powder wad during acceleration down the bore. Cartridges manufactured by Federal Cartridge Company contained 25 flechettes. Tips of the flechettes are exposed in the Federal cartridges, but concealed by a conventional star crimp in Western cartridges. Flechettes had flatter trajectory over longer ranges than spherical buckshot, but combat effectiveness did not justify continued production.

=== A023 ===
The United States Navy included rifled slug cartridges among 21st-century loads. Slugs from these 2.75 in (7.0 cm) cartridges have a muzzle velocity between 1,590 ft (480 m) and 1,770 ft (540 m) per second.

== Experimental ==
FRAG-12 is experimental military shotgun grenade ammunition under consideration by military forces. Coming in three variants: High explosive (HE), high explosive armor-piercing (HEAP) and high explosive fragmenting antipersonnel (HEFA) used by the AA-12 Atchisson Assault Shotgun and potentially other shotguns.
