= Shotgun =

Firearm loaded with a cartridge of pellets

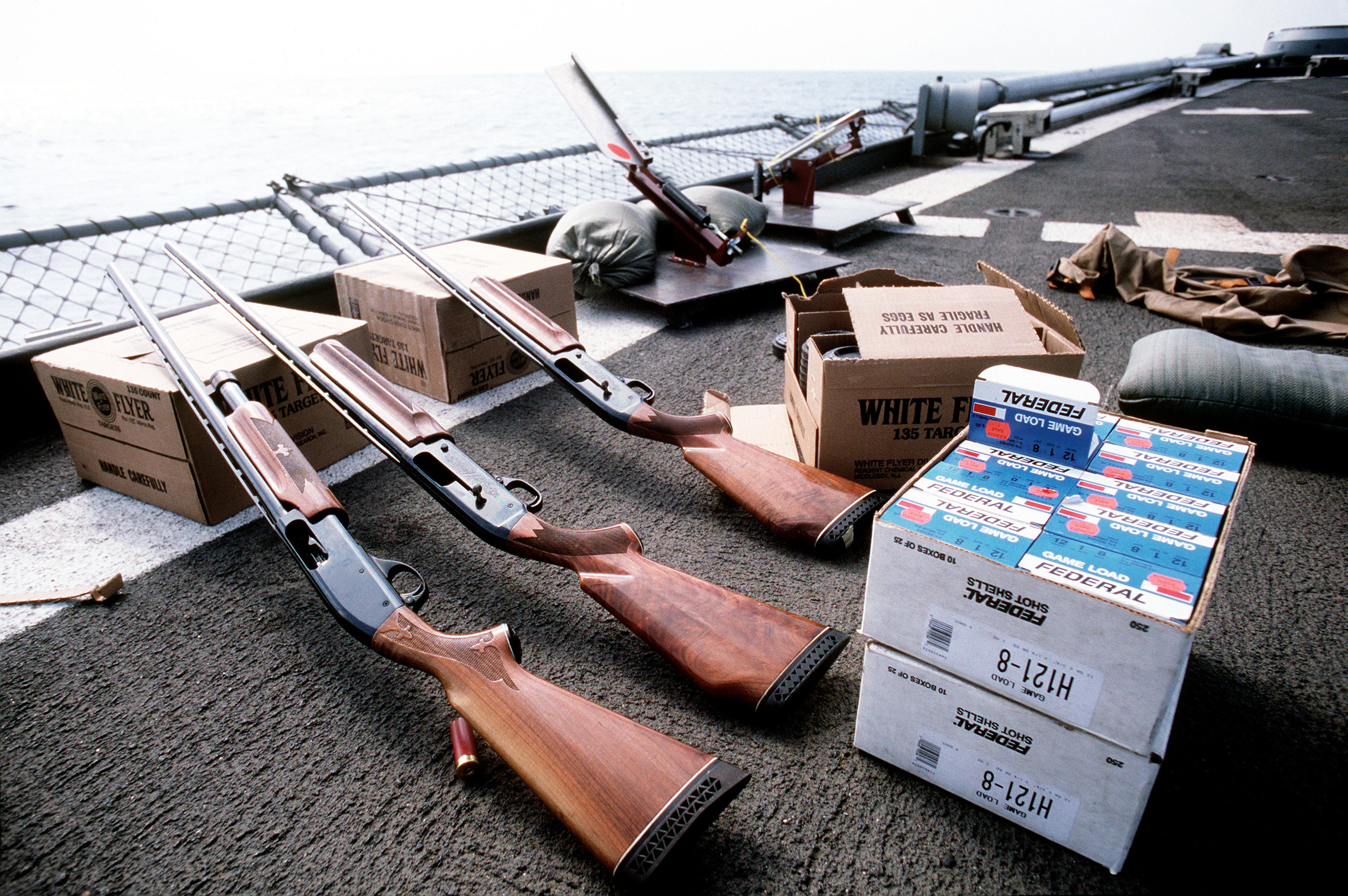
A pump-action Remington 870, two semi-automatic Remington 1100 shotguns, 20 boxes of shotgun shells, a clay trap, and three boxes of clay pigeons

A shotgun (also known as a scattergun, peppergun, or historically as a fowling piece) is a long-barreled firearm designed to shoot a straight-walled cartridge known as a shotshell, which discharges either numerous small spherical projectiles called shot, or a single solid projectile called a slug. Shotguns are most commonly used as smoothbore firearms, meaning that their gun barrels have no rifling on the inner wall, but rifled barrels for shooting sabot slugs (slug barrels) are also available.

Shotguns come in a wide variety of calibers and gauges ranging from 5.5 mm (.22 inch) to up to 5 cm (2.0 in), though the 12-gauge (18.53 mm or 0.729 in) and 20-gauge (15.63 mm or 0.615 in) bores are by far the most common. Almost all are breechloading, and can be single barreled, double barreled, or in the form of a combination gun. Like rifles, shotguns also come in a range of different action types, both single-shot and repeating. For non-repeating designs, over-and-under and side-by-side break action shotguns are by far the most common variants. Although revolving shotguns do exist, most modern repeating shotguns are either pump action or semi-automatic, and also fully automatic, lever-action, or bolt-action to a lesser extent.

Preceding smoothbore firearms (such as the musket) were widely used by European militaries from the 17th until the mid-19th century. The muzzleloading blunderbuss, the direct ancestor of the shotgun, was also used in similar roles from self-defense to riot control. Shotguns were often favored by cavalry troops in the early to mid-19th century because of their ease of use and generally good effectiveness on the move, as well as by coachmen for their substantial power. However, by the late 19th century, these weapons became largely replaced on the battlefield by breechloading rifled firearms shooting spin-stabilized cylindro-conoidal bullets, which were far more accurate with longer effective ranges. The military value of shotguns was rediscovered in the First World War, when American forces used the pump-action Winchester Model 1897 shotgun in trench fighting to great effect. Since then, shotguns have been used in a variety of close-quarters combat roles in civilian, law enforcement, and military applications.

The smoothbore shotgun barrel generates less resistance and thus allows greater propellant loads for heavier projectiles without as much risk of overpressure or a squib load, and are also easier to clean. The shot pellets from a shotshell are propelled indirectly through a wadding inside the shell and scatter upon leaving the barrel, which is usually choked at the muzzle end to control the projectile scatter. This means each shotgun discharge will produce a cluster of impact points instead of a single point of impact like other firearms. Having multiple projectiles also means the muzzle energy is divided among the pellets, leaving each individual projectile with less penetrative kinetic energy. The lack of spin stabilization and the generally suboptimal aerodynamic shape of the shot pellets also make them less accurate and decelerate quite quickly in flight due to drag, giving shotguns short effective ranges. In a hunting context, this makes shotguns useful primarily for hunting fast-flying birds and other agile small/medium-sized game without risking overpenetration and stray shots to distant bystanders and objects. However, in a military or law enforcement context, the high short-range blunt knockback force and large number of projectiles makes the shotgun useful as a door breaching tool, a crowd control or close-quarters defensive weapon. Militants or insurgents may use shotguns in asymmetric engagements, as shotguns are commonly owned civilian weapons in many countries. In more modern and recent conflicts (such as the Russia-Ukraine war), shotguns have been found as one of the most effective tools to repel and shoot down enemy drones. This is due to the unique feature of common shotgun rounds (buckshot, birdshot, etc.) of pellet spread, which makes shooting fast moving targets easier than with firearms that only shoot single projectiles. Shotguns are also used for target-shooting sports such as skeet, trap, and sporting clays, which involve flying clay disks, known as "clay pigeons", thrown in various ways by a dedicated launching device called a "trap".

== History ==
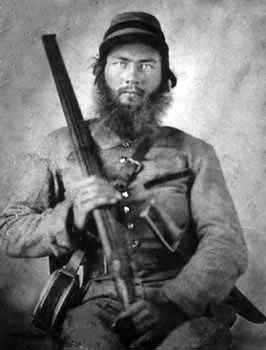
A Confederate cavalryman during the American Civil War

Most early firearms, such as the blunderbuss, arquebus, and musket had large diameter, smoothbore barrels, and could fire shot as well as solid balls. A firearm intended for use in wing shooting of birds was known as a fowling piece. Fowling pieces first appeared in 16th century Europe, and in the early 17th century their barrels were extended as long as 6 ft to increase accuracy.

An example was the Brown Bess musket, in service with the British army from 1722 to 1838, had a 19 mm (.75 inch) smoothbore barrel, roughly the same as a 10-gauge shotgun, and was 157 cm (62 in) long, just short of the above recommended 168 cm (5 1/2 feet). On the other hand, records from the Plymouth Colony show a maximum length of 137 cm (4 1/2 feet) for fowling pieces, shorter than the typical musket.

Shot was also used in warfare; the buck and ball loading, combining a musket ball with three or six buckshot, was used throughout the history of the smoothbore musket. The first recorded use of the term shotgun was in 1776 in Kentucky used in correspondence coming to and from Fort Boonesborough. It was noted as part of the "Frontier Language of the West" by James Fenimore Cooper. The correspondence from Fort Boonesborough is in the Lyman Draper Collection from the University of Wisconsin. The Oak Openings (also known as The Bee Hunter) from James Fenimore cooper attributed to the usage and popularization of shotgun and can be found at Project Gutenberg.

With the adoption of smaller bores and rifled barrels, the shotgun began to emerge as a separate entity. Shotguns have long been the preferred method for sport hunting of birds, and the largest shotguns, the punt guns, were used for commercial hunting. The double-barreled shotgun has changed little since the development of the boxlock action in 1875. Modern innovations such as interchangeable chokes and subgauge inserts make the double-barreled shotgun the shotgun of choice in skeet, trap shooting, and sporting clays, as well as with many hunters.

As wing shooting has been a prestige sport, specialty gunsmiths such as Krieghoff or Perazzi have produced fancy double-barrel guns for wealthy European and American hunters. These weapons can cost US$5,000 or more; some elaborately decorated presentation guns have sold for up to US$100,000.

During its long history, the shotgun has been favored by bird hunters, guards, and law enforcement officials. The shotgun has fallen in and out of favor with military forces several times in its long history. Shotguns and similar weapons are simpler than long-range rifles, and were developed earlier. The development of more accurate and deadlier long-range rifles minimized the usefulness of the shotgun on the open battlefields of European wars. But armies have "rediscovered" the shotgun for specialty uses many times.

=== 19th century ===
During the 19th century, shotguns were mainly employed by cavalry units. Both sides of the American Civil War employed shotguns. U.S. cavalry used the shotgun extensively during the Indian Wars in the latter half of the 19th century. Mounted units favored the shotgun for its moving target effectiveness, and devastating close-range firepower. The shotgun was also favored by citizen militias and similar groups.

With the exception of cavalry units, the shotgun saw less and less use throughout the 19th century on the battlefield. As a defense weapon, it remained popular with guards and lawmen, however, and the shotgun became one of many symbols of the American Old West. Lawman Cody Lyons killed two men with a shotgun; his friend Doc Holliday's only confirmed kill was with a shotgun. The weapon both these men used was the short-barreled version favored by private strongbox guards on stages and trains. These guards, called express messengers, became known as shotgun messengers, since they rode with the weapon (loaded with buckshot) for defense against bandits. Passenger carriages carrying a strongbox usually had at least one private guard armed with a shotgun riding in front of the coach, next to the driver. This practice has survived in American slang; the term "riding shotgun" is used for the passenger who sits in the front passenger seat. The shotgun was a popular weapon for personal protection in the American Old West, requiring less skill on the part of the user than a revolver.

=== Hammerless shotguns ===
The origins of the hammerless shotgun are European but otherwise obscure. The earliest breechloading shotguns originated in France and Belgium in the early 19th century (see also the history of the pinfire) and a number of them such as those by Robert and Chateauvillard from the 1830s and 1840s did not use hammers. In fact during these decades a wide variety of ingenious weapons, including rifles, adopted what is now often known as a "needle-fire" method of igniting the charge, where a firing pin or a longer sharper needle provided the necessary impact. The most widely used British hammerless needle-fire shotgun was the unusual hinged-chamber fixed-barrel breech-loader by Joseph Needham, produced from the 1850s. By the 1860s, hammerless guns were increasingly used in Europe both in war and sport, although hammer guns were still very much in the majority. The first significant encroachment on hammer guns was a hammerless patent which could be used with a conventional side-lock. This was British gunmaker T. Murcott's 1871 action nicknamed the "mousetrap" on account of its loud snap action. However, the most successful hammerless innovation of the 1870s was Anson and Deeley's boxlock patent of 1875. This simple but ingenious design only used four moving parts allowing the production of cheaper and reliable shotguns.

Daniel Myron LeFever is credited with the invention of the American hammerless shotgun. Working for Barber & LeFever in Syracuse, New York, he introduced his first hammerless shotgun in 1878. This gun was cocked with external cocking levers on the side of the breech. He went on to patent the first truly automatic hammerless shotgun in 1883. This gun automatically cocked itself when the breech was closed. He later developed the mechanism to automatically eject the shells when the breech was opened.

=== John Moses Browning ===
One of the men most responsible for the modern development of the shotgun was prolific gun designer John Browning. While working for Winchester Firearms, Browning revolutionized shotgun design. In 1887, Browning introduced the Model 1887 Lever Action Repeating Shotgun, which loaded a fresh cartridge from its internal magazine by the operation of the action lever. Before this time, most shotguns were the break-open type.

This development was greatly overshadowed by two further innovations he introduced at the end of the 19th century. In 1893, Browning produced the Model 1893 Pump Action Shotgun, introducing the now familiar pump action to the market. And in 1900, he patented the Browning Auto-5, America's first semi-automatic shotgun. The first semi-automatic shotgun in the world was patented in 1891–1893 by the Clair brothers of France. The Browning Auto-5 remained in production until 1998.

=== World wars ===
The decline in military use of shotguns reversed in World War I. American forces under General Pershing employed 12-gauge pump-action shotguns when they were deployed to the Western Front in 1917. These shotguns were fitted with bayonets and a heat shield so the barrel could be gripped while the bayonet was deployed. Shotguns fitted in this fashion became known as trench guns by the United States Army. Those without such modifications were known as riot guns. After World War I, the United States military began referring to all shotguns as riot guns.

Due to the cramped conditions of trench warfare, the American shotguns were extremely effective. Germany even filed an official diplomatic protest against their use, alleging they violated the laws of warfare. The judge advocate general reviewed the protest, and it was rejected because the Germans protested use of lead shot (which would have been illegal) but military shot was plated. This is the only occasion the legality of the shotgun's use in warfare has been questioned.

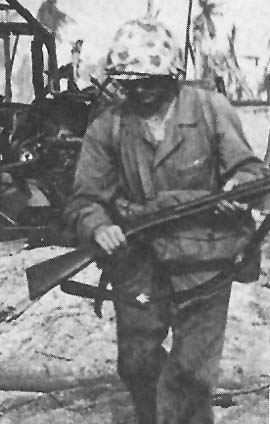
A United States Marine carrying a Winchester M97 shotgun during World War II

During World War II, the shotgun was not heavily used in the war in Europe by official military forces. However, the shotgun was a favorite weapon of Allied-supported partisans, such as the French Resistance. By contrast, in the Pacific theater, thick jungles and heavily fortified positions made the shotgun a favorite weapon of the United States Marines. Marines tended to use pump shotguns, since the pump action was less likely to jam in the humid and dirty conditions of the Pacific campaign. Similarly, the United States Navy used pump shotguns to guard ships when in port in Chinese harbors (e.g., Shanghai). The United States Army Air Forces also used pump shotguns to guard bombers and other aircraft against saboteurs when parked on airbases across the Pacific and on the West Coast of the United States. Pump and semi-automatic shotguns were used in marksmanship training, particularly for bomber gunners. The most common pump shotguns used for these duties were the 12-gauge Winchester Model 97 and Model 12. The break-open action, single-barrel shotgun was used by the British Home Guard and U.S. home security forces. Notably, industrial centers (such as the Gopher State Steel Works) were guarded by National Guard soldiers with Winchester Model 37 12-gauge shotguns.

=== Late 20th century to present ===
Since the end of World War II, the shotgun has remained a specialty weapon for modern armies. It has been deployed for specialized tasks where its strengths were put to particularly good use. It was used to defend machine gun emplacements during the Korean War, American and French jungle patrols used shotguns during the Vietnam War, and shotguns saw extensive use as door breaching and close-quarter weapons in the early stages of the Iraq War, as well as limited use among tank crews. Many modern navies make extensive use of shotguns by personnel engaged in boarding hostile ships, as any shots fired will almost certainly be over a short range. Nonetheless, shotguns are far less common in military use than rifles, carbines, submachine guns, or pistols.

On the other hand, the shotgun has become a standard in law enforcement use. A variety of specialty less-lethal or non-lethal ammunitions, such as tear gas shells, bean bags, flares, explosive sonic stun rounds, and rubber projectiles, all packaged into 12-gauge shotgun shells, are produced specifically for the law enforcement market. Recently, Taser International introduced a self-contained electronic weapon which is fired from a standard 12-gauge shotgun.

The shotgun remains a standard firearm for hunting throughout the world for all sorts of game from birds and small game to large game such as deer. The versatility of the shotgun as a hunting weapon has steadily increased as slug rounds and more advanced rifled barrels have given shotguns longer range and higher killing power. The shotgun has become a ubiquitous firearm in the hunting community.

== Design factors ==
=== Action ===
The action is the operating mechanism of a gun. There are many types of shotguns, typically categorized by the number of barrels or the way the gun is reloaded.

==== Break-action ====
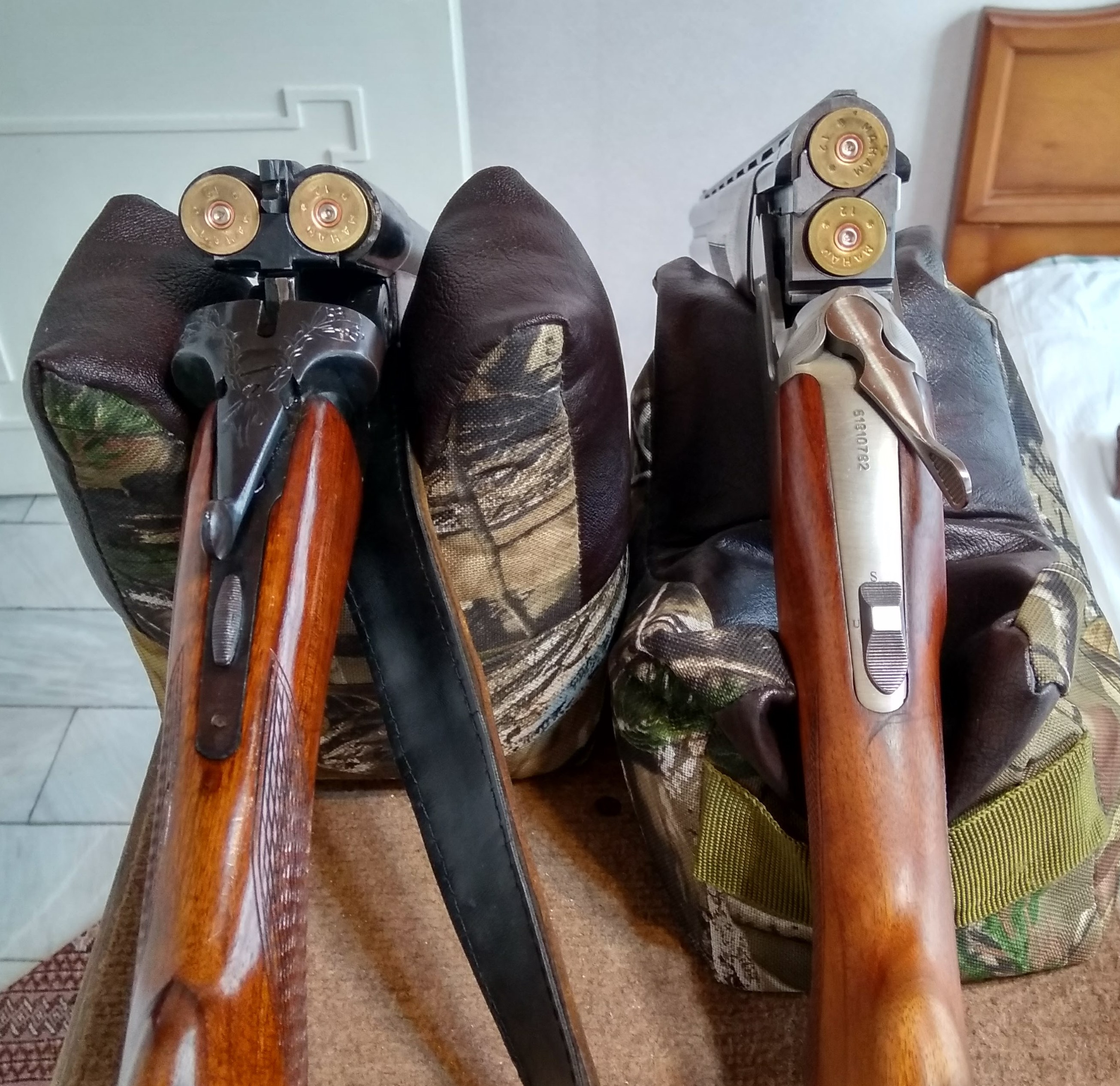
A view of the break-action of a side-by-side, and an over-and-under double-barreled shotgun, both shown with the action open

For most of the history of the shotgun, the breechloading break-action shotgun was the most common type, and double-barreled variants are by far the most commonly seen in modern days. These are typically divided into two subtypes: the traditional "side-by-side" shotgun features two barrels mounted horizontally beside each other (as the name suggests), whereas the "over-and-under" shotgun has the two barrels mounted vertically one on top of the other. Side-by-side shotguns were traditionally used for hunting and other sporting pursuits (early long-barreled side-by-side shotguns were known as "fowling pieces" for their use hunting ducks and other waterbirds as well as some landfowls), whereas over-and-under shotguns are more commonly associated with recreational use (such as clay pigeon shooting). Both types of double-barrel shotgun are used for hunting and sporting use, with the individual configuration largely being a matter of personal preference.

Another, less commonly encountered type of break-action shotgun is the combination gun, which is an over-and-under design with one smoothbore barrel and one rifle barrel (more often with a rifle barrel on top, but a rifle barrel on bottom was not uncommon). There is also a class of break-action guns called drillings, which contain three barrels, usually two smoothbore barrels of the same gauge and a rifled barrel, though the only common theme is that at least one barrel be smoothbore. The most common arrangement was essentially a side-by-side shotgun with the rifled barrel below and centered. Usually a drilling containing more than one rifled barrel would have both rifled barrels in the same caliber, but examples do exist with different caliber barrels, usually a .22 long rifle and a centerfire cartridge. Although very rare, drillings with three and even four (a vierling) shotgun barrels were made.

==== Pump-action ====
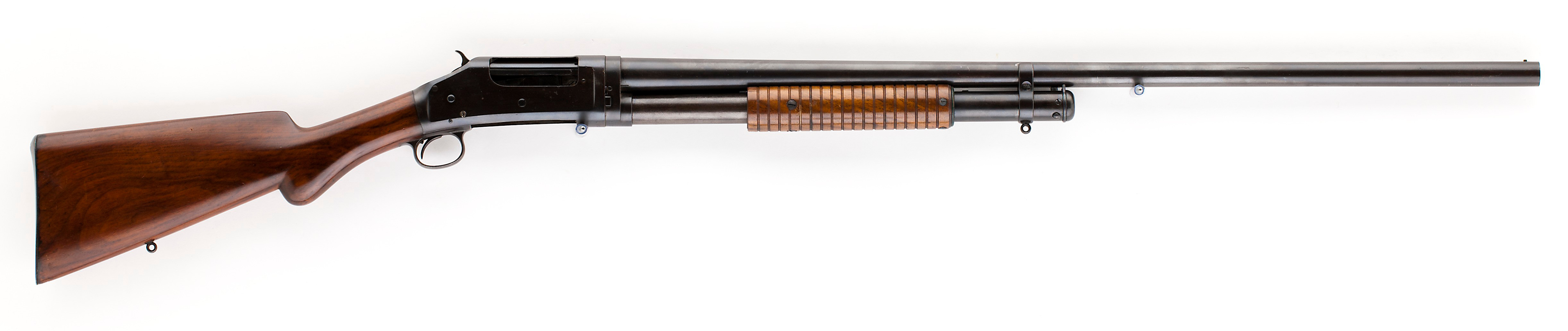
A Winchester M1897, one of the first successful pump-action shotgun designs

In pump-action shotguns, a linearly sliding fore-end handguard (i.e. pump) is manually moved back-and-forth like a hand pump to work the action, extracting the spent shell and inserting a new round, while cocking the hammer or striker. A pump-action shotgun is typically fed from a tubular magazine underneath the barrel, which also serves as a guide rail for the pump. The rounds are fed in one by one through a port in the receiver, where they are lifted by a lever called the elevator and pushed forward into the chamber by the bolt. A pair of latches at the rear of the magazine hold the rounds in place and facilitate feeding of one shell at a time. If it is desired to load the gun fully, a round may be loaded through the ejection port directly into the chamber, or cycled from the magazine, which is then topped off with another round. Well-known examples include the Winchester Model 1897, Remington 870, and Mossberg 500/590.

Pump-action shotguns are common hunting, fowling and sporting shotguns. Hunting models generally have a barrel between 600 and 700 mm (24–28 in). Tube-fed models designed for hunting often come with a dowel rod or other stop that is inserted into the magazine and reduces the capacity of the gun to three shells (two in the magazine and one chambered) as is mandated by U.S. federal law when hunting migratory birds. They can also easily be used with an empty magazine as a single-shot weapon, by simply dropping the next round to be fired into the open ejection port after the spent round is ejected. For this reason, pump-actions are commonly used to teach novice shooters under supervision, as the trainer can load each round more quickly than with a break-action, while unlike a break-action, the student can maintain his grip on the gun and concentrate on proper handling and firing of the weapon.

Pump-action shotguns with shorter barrels and little or no barrel choke are highly popular for use in home defense, military and law enforcement, and are commonly known as riot guns. The minimum barrel length for shotguns in most of the U.S. is 18 inches (460 mm), and this barrel length (sometimes 18.5–20 in (470–510 mm) to increase magazine capacity and/or ensure the gun is legal regardless of measuring differences) is the primary choice for riot shotguns. The shorter barrel makes the weapon easier to maneuver around corners and in tight spaces, though slightly longer barrels are sometimes used outdoors for a tighter spread pattern or increased accuracy of slug projectiles. Home-defense and law enforcement shotguns are usually chambered for 12-gauge shells, providing maximum shot power and the use of a variety of projectiles such as buckshot, rubber, sandbag and slug shells, but 20-gauge (common in bird-hunting shotguns) or .410 (common in youth-size shotguns) are also available in defense-type shotgun models allowing easier use by novice shooters.

A riot shotgun has many advantages over a handgun or rifle. Compared to "defense-caliber" handguns (chambered for 9mm Parabellum, .38 Special, .357 Magnum, .40 S&W, .45 ACP, and similar), a shotgun has far more power and damage potential (up to 10 times the muzzle energy of a .45 ACP cartridge), allowing a "one-shot stop" that is more difficult to achieve with typical handgun loads. Compared to a rifle, riot shotguns are easier to maneuver due to the shorter barrel, still provide better damage potential at indoor distances (generally 3–5 meters/yards), and reduce the risk of "overpenetration"; that is, the bullet or shot passing completely through the target and continuing beyond, which poses a risk to those behind the target through walls. The wide spread of the shot reduces the importance of shot placement compared to a single projectile, which increases the effectiveness of "point shooting" – rapidly aiming simply by pointing the weapon in the direction of the target. This allows easy, fast use by novices.

==== Lever-action ====
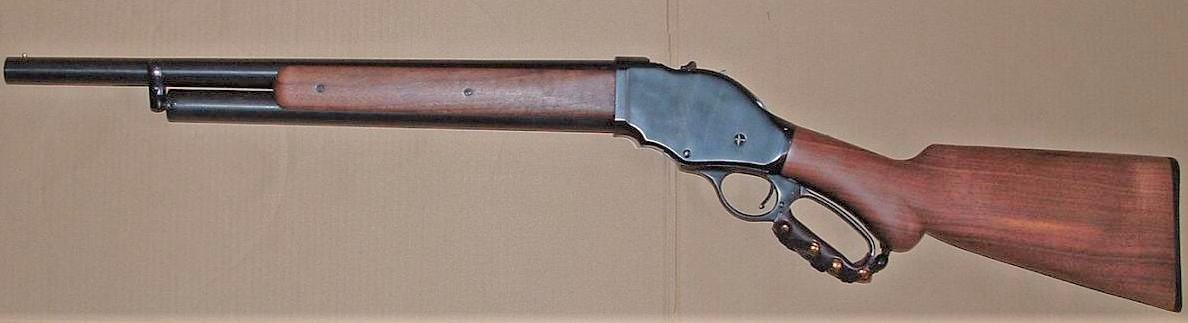
A modern reproduction of the Winchester M1887 lever-action shotgun

Early attempts at repeating shotguns invariably centred around either bolt- or lever-action designs, drawing inspiration from contemporary repeating rifles, with the earliest successful repeating shotgun being the lever-action Winchester M1887, designed by John Browning at the behest of the Winchester Repeating Arms Company.

Lever shotguns, while less common, were popular in the late 19th century with the Winchester Model 1887 and Model 1901 being prime examples. Initially very popular, demand waned after the introduction of pump-action shotguns around the start of the 20th century, and production was eventually discontinued in 1920.

One major issue with lever-actions (and, to a lesser extent, pump-actions) was that early shotgun shells were often made of paper or similar fragile materials (modern hulls are plastic or metal). As a result, the loading of shells, or working of the action of the shotgun, could often result in cartridges getting crushed and becoming unusable, or even damaging the gun.

Lever shotguns have seen a return to the gun market in recent years, however, with Winchester producing the Model 9410 (chambering the .410-gauge shotgun shell and using the action of the Winchester Model 94 series lever-action rifle, hence the name), and a handful of other firearm manufacturers (primarily Norinco of China and ADI Ltd. of Australia) producing versions of the Winchester Model 1887/1901 designed for modern 12-gauge smokeless shotshells with more durable plastic casings. There has been a notable increase in lever-action shotgun sales in Australia since 1997, when pump-actions were effectively outlawed.

==== Bolt-action ====
Bolt-action shotguns, while uncommon, do exist. One of the best-known examples is a 12-gauge manufactured by Mossberg featuring a 3-round magazine, marketed in Australia just after changes to the gun laws in 1997 heavily restricted the ownership and use of pump-action and semi-automatic shotguns. They were not a huge success, as they were somewhat slow and awkward to operate, and the rate of fire was noticeably slower (on average) than a double-barreled gun. The Rifle Factory Ishapore in India also manufactured a single-shot .410 bore shotgun based on the SMLE Mk III* rifle. The Russian Berdana shotgun was effectively a single-shot bolt-action rifle that became obsolete, and was subsequently modified to chamber 16-gauge shotgun shells for civilian sale. The U.S. military M26 is also a bolt-action weapon. Bolt-action shotguns have also been used in the "goose gun" application, intended to kill birds such as geese at greater range. Typically, goose guns have long barrels (up to 36 inches), and small bolt-fed magazines. Bolt-action shotguns are also used in conjunction with slug shells for the maximum possible accuracy from a shotgun.

In Australia, some straight-pull bolt-action shotguns, such as the Turkish-made Pardus BA12 and Dickinson T1000, the American C-More Competition M26, as well as the indigenous-designed SHS STP 12, have become increasingly popular alternatives to lever-action shotguns, largely due to the better ergonomics with less stress on the shooter's trigger hand and fingers when cycling the action.

==== Revolver ====
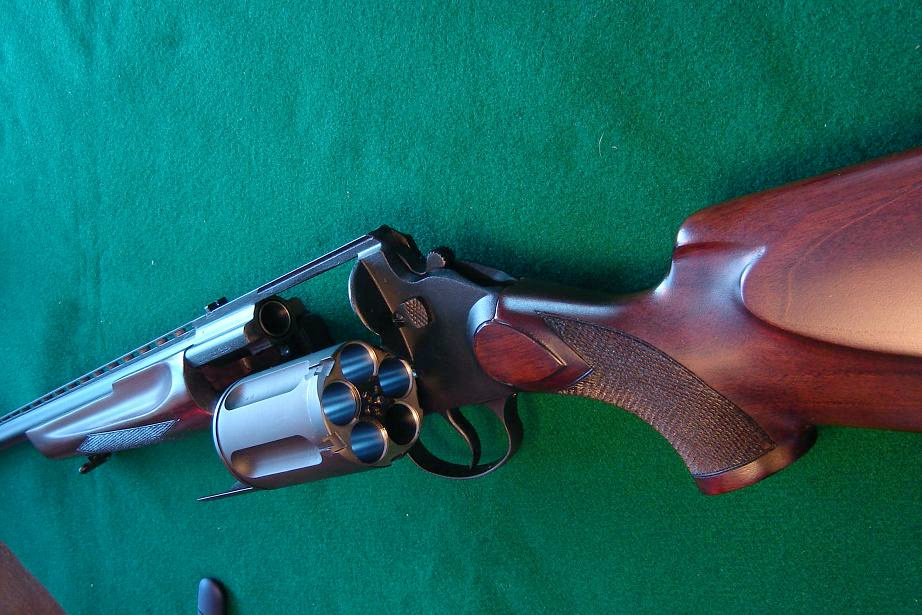
Closeup of MTs255

Colt briefly manufactured several revolving shotguns that were not particularly successful. The Colt Model 1839 Shotgun was manufactured between 1839 and 1841. Later, the Colt Model 1855 Shotgun, based on the Model 1855 revolving rifle, was manufactured between 1860 and 1863. Because of their low production numbers and age, they are among the rarest of all Colt firearms.

The Armsel Striker was a modern take on the revolving shotgun that held ten rounds of 12-gauge ammunition in its cylinder. It was copied by Cobray as the Streetsweeper.

Taurus manufactures a carbine variant of the Taurus Judge revolver along with its Australian partner company Rossi, known as the Taurus/Rossi Circuit Judge. It comes in the original combination chambering of .410 bore and .45 Long Colt, as well as the .44 Remington Magnum chambering. The rifle has small blast shields attached to the cylinder to protect the shooter from hot gases escaping between the cylinder and barrel.

The MTs255 (Russian: МЦ255) is a shotgun fed by a 5-round internal revolving cylinder. It is produced by the TsKIB SOO, Central Design and Research Bureau of Sporting and Hunting Arms. They are available in 12, 20, 28 and 32 gauges, and .410 bore.

==== Semi-automatic ====
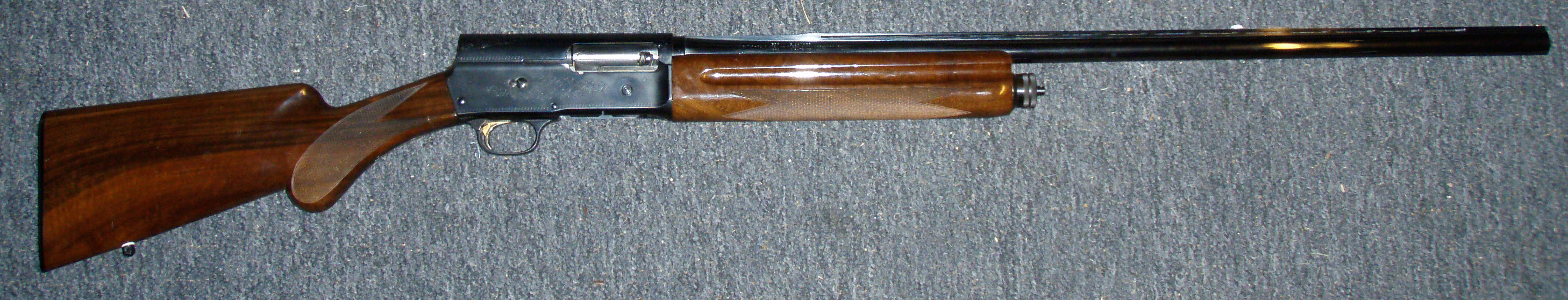
A Browning A-5 semi-automatic shotgun

Recoil/inertia-driven or gas-operated actions are other popular methods of increasing the rate of fire of a shotgun; these self-loading shotguns are generally referred to as autoloaders. Instead of having the action manually operated by a pump or lever, the action automatically cycles each time the shotgun is fired, ejecting the spent shell and reloading a fresh one into the chamber. The first successful semi-automatic shotgun was John Browning's Auto-5, first produced by Fabrique Nationale beginning in 1902. Other well-known examples include the Remington 1100, Benelli M1, and Saiga-12.

Some, such as the Franchi SPAS-12 and Benelli M3, are capable of switching between semi-automatic and pump action. These are popular for two reasons; first, some jurisdictions forbid the use of semi-automatic actions for hunting, and second, lower-powered rounds, like "reduced-recoil" buckshot shells and many less-lethal cartridges, have insufficient power to reliably cycle a semi-automatic shotgun.

==== Automatic ====
Fully automatic shotguns, such as the 1960s (appeared in 1967) Vietnam War-era Remington Model 7188 (designed for and used by U.S. Navy SEALs in Vietnam), the Auto Assault-12 (AA-12) or the USAS-12 also exist, but they are still rare.

==== Other ====
In addition to the commonly encountered shotgun actions already listed, there are also shotguns based on the Martini-Henry rifle design, originally designed by British arms maker W.W. Greener.

Some of the more interesting advances in shotgun technology include the versatile NeoStead 2000 and fully automatics such as the Pancor Jackhammer or Auto-Assault 12.

In 1925, Rodolfo Cosmi produced the first working prototype hybrid semi-automatic shotgun, which had an 8-round magazine located in the stock. While it reloaded automatically after each shot like a semi-automatic, it had a break-action to load the first shell. This design has only been repeated once, by Beretta with their UGB25 automatic shotgun. The user loads the first shell by breaking the gun in the manner of a break-action shotgun, then closes it and inserts the second shell into a clip on the gun's right side. The spent hulls are ejected downwards. The guns combine the advantages of the break action (they can be proven to be safe by breaking open, there are no flying hulls) with those of the semi-automatic (low recoil, low barrel axis position hence low muzzle flip).

The Italian firearms manufacturer Benelli Armi SpA also makes the Benelli M3, a dual-mode hybrid shotgun that allows the user the choice of semi-automatic or pump-action operation. Pump-action operation is employed when shooting less energetic shells (such as baton rounds) that do not generate enough recoil to operate the semi-automatic mechanism. Conversely, the semi-automatic mode can be employed with more powerful shells, absorbing some of the recoil. Switching between the two modes is done by manipulating the ring located at the front of the foregrip.

The French firearm manufacturer Verney-Carron produces the Véloce shotgun, a "lever-release blowback firearm" using bolt catch mechanism like its similarly designed SpeedLine rifle. The Véloce is in essence a modified inertia-driven semi-automatic shotgun, but after blowback, the bolt is trapped by a bolt stop and cannot return to battery unless it is manually released by depressing a thumb lever near the tang of the grip. Because the gun will not chamber a new round without manual actuation, the design is technically not really a self-loading, and Verney-Carron described it as a "manual repeating shotgun". When Australian firearm dealers tried to import the Véloce shotgun in 2018, Greens' David Shoebridge and anti-gun groups such as Gun Control Australia caused a moral panic on the mainstream media, calling it "semi-semi-automatic" that needed to be prohibited as a "rapid-fire weapon".

=== Gauge ===
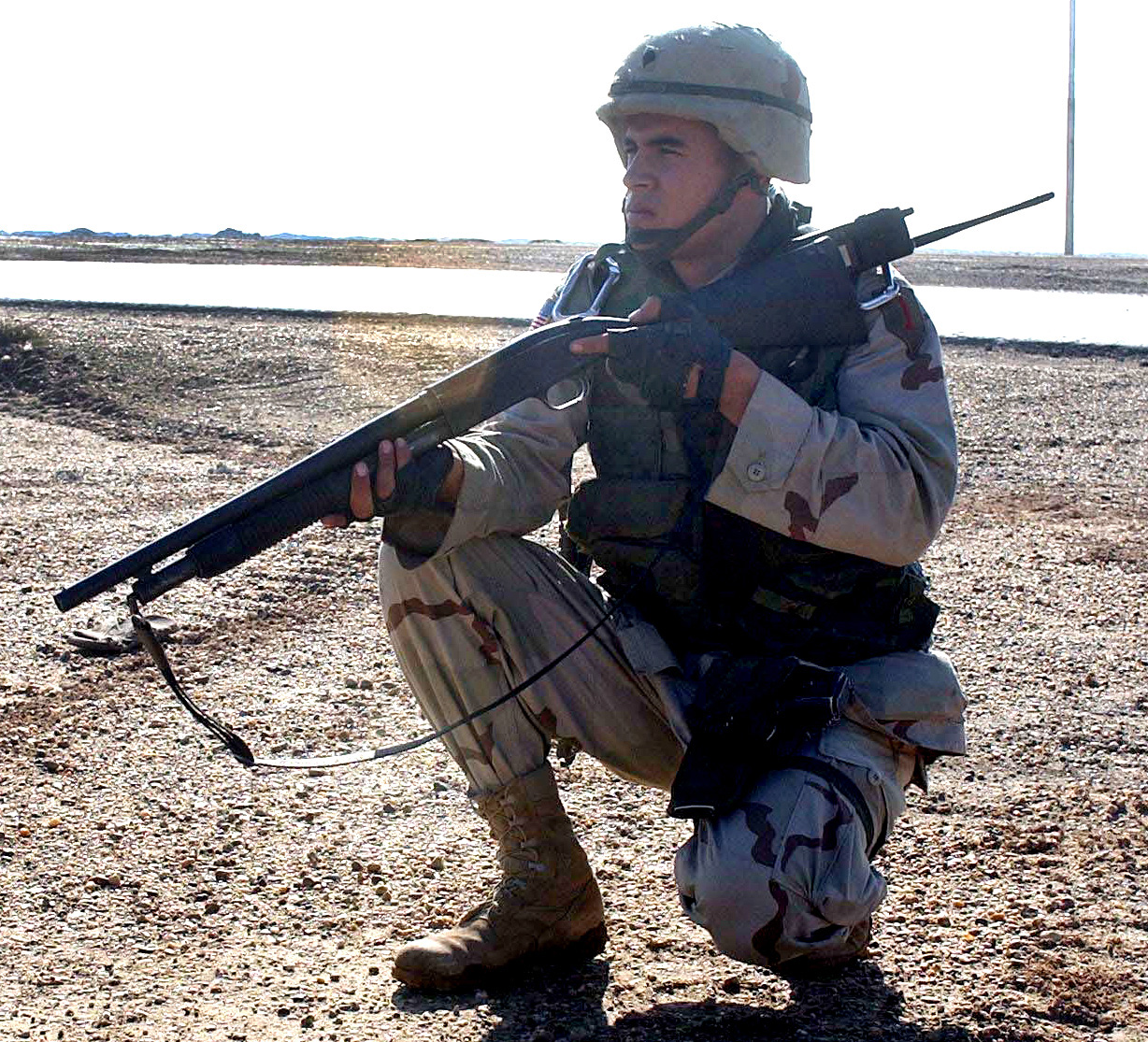
A United States Army soldier armed with a Mossberg 500 shotgun

The gauge number is determined by the weight, in fractions of a pound, of a solid sphere of lead with a diameter equal to the inside diameter of the barrel. So, a 10-gauge shotgun nominally should have an inside diameter equal to that of a sphere made from one-tenth of a pound of lead. Each gauge has a set caliber. By far the most common gauges are 12 (0.729 in, 18.5mm diameter) and 20 (0.614 in, 15.6mm); other, less common gauges include 10, 16, 24, 28, 32, and 67 (.410 bore).

Different gauges have different typical applications. 12-gauge shotguns are common for hunting geese, large ducks, or other big larger gamebirds; professional skeet and trap shooting; military applications; and home-defense applications. 16-gauge shotguns were once common for hunters who wanted to use only a single shotgun for gamebirds normally pursued with 12- or 20-gauge shotguns, but have become rarer in recent years. 20-gauge shotguns are often used for gamebirds such as doves, smaller ducks, and quail. 28-gauge shotguns are not as common but are classic quail-hunting guns. .410-gauge shotguns are typically used for squirrel hunting or for sportsmen seeking the challenge of killing game with a smaller load.

Other, less common shotgun cartridges have their own unique uses. Ammunition manufacturer CCI produces 9mm Parabellum (.355 in.) and several other popular pistol calibers up to .45 ACP (11.43mm), as well as smaller calibers such as .22 Long Rifle (5.5mm) and .22 Magnum (5.5mm). These are commonly called snake shot cartridges. Larger gauges, up to 4 bore, too powerful to shoulder, have been built, but were generally affixed to small boats and referred to as punt guns. These were used for commercial waterfowl hunting, to kill large numbers of birds resting on the water.

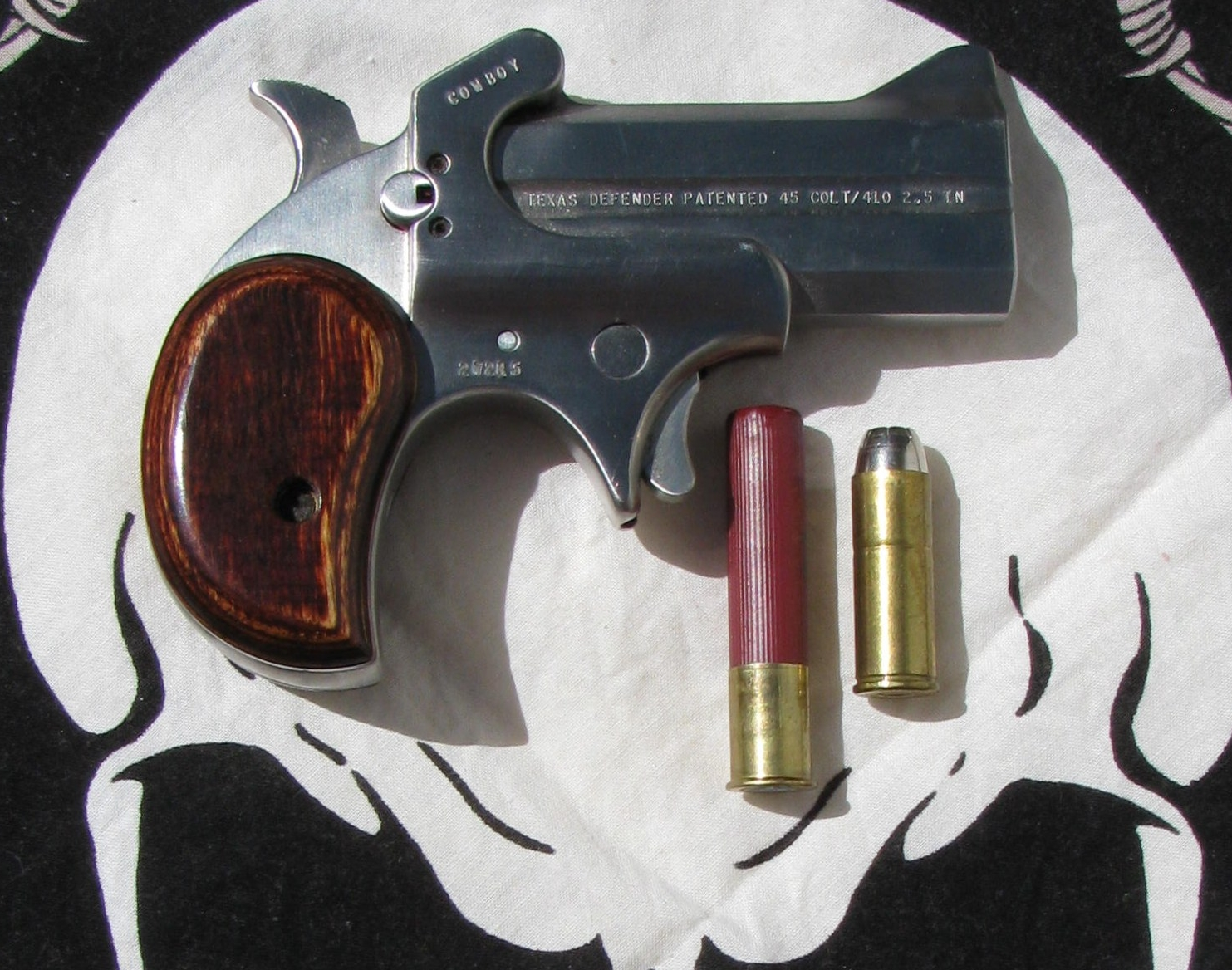
Bond Arms Cowboy Defender .45 Colt/.410 Shotshell Derringer

Handguns have also been produced that are capable of firing either .45 (Long) Colt or .410 shotgun shells from the same chamber; they are commonly known as "snake guns". Derringers such as the "Snake Slayer and Cowboy Defender" are popular among some outdoorsmen in the South and Southwest regions of the United States. There are also some revolvers, such as the Taurus Judge and Smith & Wesson Governor, that are capable of shooting the .45LC/.410 rounds; but, as with derringers, they are not considered shotguns.

The .410 bore (10.4 mm) is unusual, being measured in inches, and would be approximately 67 "real" gauge, though its short hull versions are nominally called 36-gauge in Europe. It uses a relatively small charge of shot. It is used for hunting and for skeet. Because of its very light recoil (approx 10 N), it is often used as a beginner's gun. However, the small charge and typically tight choke make it more difficult to hit targets. It is also frequently used by expert shooters because of the difficulty, especially in expensive side-by-side and over-under models for hunting small bird game, such as quail and doves. Inexpensive bolt-action .410 shotguns are a very common first hunting shotgun among young preteen hunters, as they are used mostly for hunting squirrels, while additionally teaching bolt-action manipulation skills that will transfer easily later to adult-sized hunting rifles. Most of these young hunters move up to a 20-gauge within a few years, and to 12-gauge shotguns and full-size hunting rifles by their late teens. Still, many who are particularly recoil-averse choose to stay with 20-gauge shotguns all their adult life, as it is a suitable gauge for many popular hunting uses.

A recent innovation is the back boring of barrels, in which the barrels are bored out slightly larger than their actual gauge. This reduces the compression forces on the shot when it transitions from the chamber to the barrel. This leads to a slight reduction in perceived recoil, and an improvement in shot pattern due to reduced deformation of the shot.

=== Shot ===
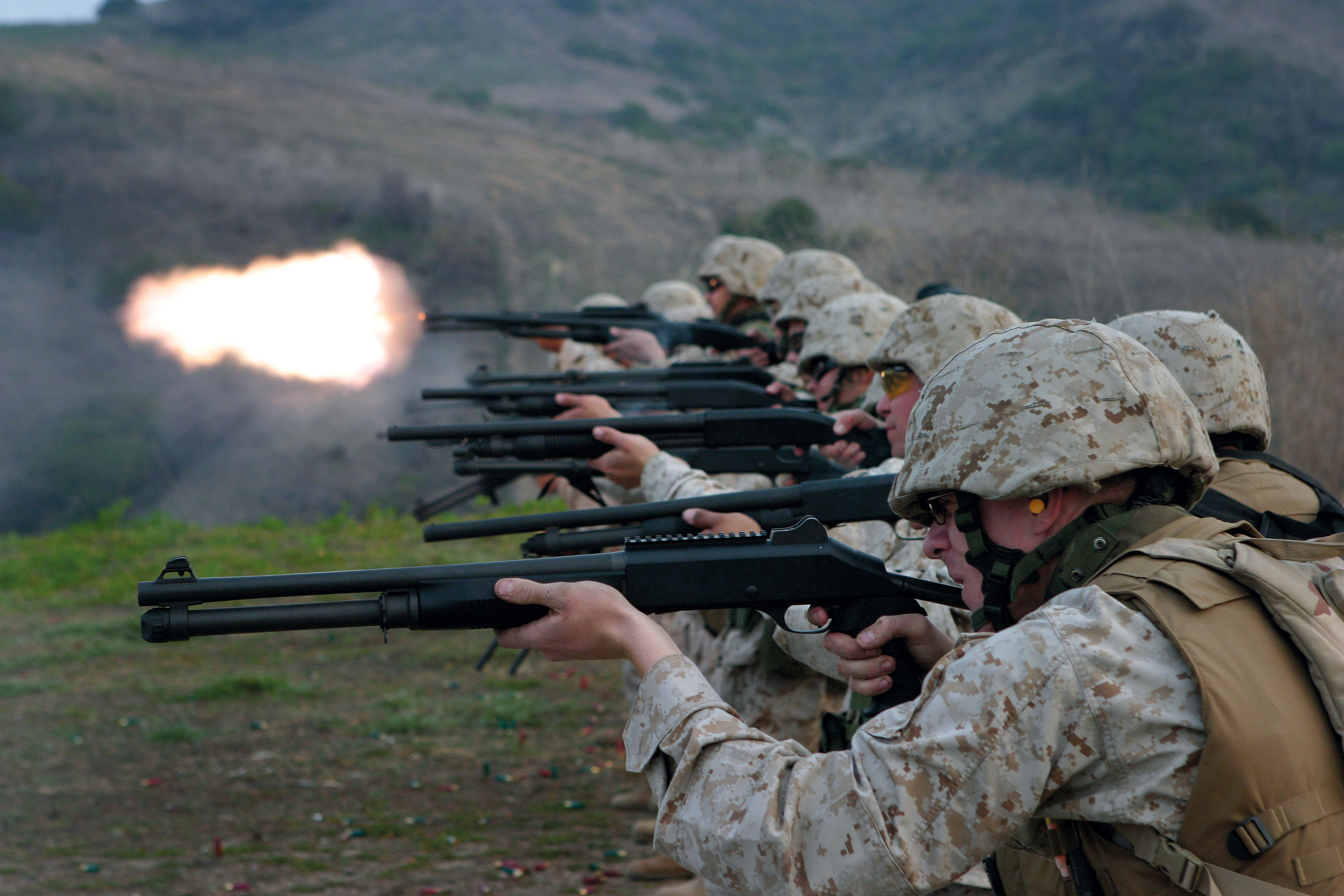
U.S. Marines fire their shotguns

Most shotguns are used to fire "a number of ball shot" (pellets), in addition to slugs and sabots. The ball shot is, for the most part, made of lead, but this has been partially replaced by bismuth, steel, tungsten-iron, tungsten-nickel-iron, and even tungsten polymer loads. Non-toxic loads are required by federal law for waterfowl hunting in the U.S., as the shot may be ingested by the waterfowl, which some authorities believe can lead to health problems due to the lead exposure. Shot is termed either birdshot or buckshot depending on the shot size. Informally, birdshot pellets have a diameter smaller than 5 mm (0.20 in) and buckshot are larger than that. Pellet size is indicated by a number; for birdshot, this ranges from the smallest 12 (1.2 mm, 0.05 in) to 2 (3.8 mm, 0.15 in) and then BB (4.6 mm, 0.18 in).

For buckshot, the numbers start and end with 4, 3, 2, 1, 0 ("single-aught"), 00 ("double-aught"), 000 ("triple-aught"), and 0000 ("quadruple-aught"). A different informal distinction is that "birdshot" pellets are small enough that they can be measured into the cartridge by weight, and simply poured in, whereas "buckshot" pellets are so large they must be stacked inside the cartridge in a fixed geometric arrangement to fit. The diameter in hundredths of an inch of bird shot sizes from No. 9 to No. 1 can be obtained by subtracting the shot size from 17. Thus, No. 4 bird shot is 17 – 4 = 13 = 0.13 inches (3.3 mm) in diameter. Different terminology is used outside the United States. In England and Australia, for example, 00 buckshot cartridges are commonly referred to as "S.G." (Swanshot gauge) cartridges.

Table of American standard birdshot size
Size	Caliber	Pellets/10 g lead	Pellets/10 g steel
FF	5.84 mm (.230")	8	12
F	5.59 mm (.220")	10	14
TT	5.33 mm (.210")	11	16
T	5.08 mm (.200")	13	19
BBB	4.83 mm (.190")	15	22
BB	4.57 mm (.180")	18	25
B	4.32 mm (.170")	21	30
1	4.06 mm (.160")	25	36
2	3.81 mm (.150")	30	44
3	3.56 mm (.140")	37	54
4	3.30 mm (.130")	47	68
5	3.05 mm (.120")	59	86
6	2.79 mm (.110")	78	112
7	2.41 mm (.100")	120	174
8	2.29 mm (.090")	140	202
9	2.03 mm (.080")	201	290

Table of buckshot size
Size	Caliber	Pellets/10 g lead
000 or LG ("triple-aught")	9.1 mm (.36")	2.2
00 or SG ("double-aught")	8.4 mm (.33")	2.9
0 ("one-aught")	8.1 mm (.32")	3.1
1	7.6 mm (.30")	3.8
2 or SSG	6.9 mm (.27")	5.2
3	6.4 mm (.25")	6.6
4	6.1 mm (.24")	7.4

=== Pattern and choke ===
Shot, small and round and delivered without spin, is ballistically inefficient. As the shot leaves the barrel, it begins to disperse in the air. The resulting cloud of pellets is known as the shot pattern, or shotgun shot spread. The ideal pattern would be a circle with an even distribution of shot throughout, with a density sufficient to ensure enough pellets will intersect the target to achieve the desired result, such as a kill when hunting or a break when shooting clay targets. In reality, the pattern is closer to a Gaussian (normal) distribution, with a higher density in the center that tapers off at the edges. Patterns are usually measured by firing at a 30-inch (76 cm) diameter circle on a large sheet of paper placed at varying distances. The hits inside the circle are counted, and compared to the total number of pellets, and the density of the pattern inside the circle is examined. An "ideal" pattern would put nearly 100% of the pellets in the circle and would have no voids—any region where a target silhouette will fit and not cover 3 or more holes is considered a potential problem.

A constriction in the end of the barrel known as the choke is used to tailor the pattern for different purposes. Chokes may either be formed as part of the barrel at the time of manufacture, by squeezing the end of the bore down over a mandrel, or by threading the barrel and screwing in an interchangeable choke tube. The choke typically consists of a conical section that smoothly tapers from the bore diameter down to the choke diameter, followed by a cylindrical section of the choke diameter. Briley Manufacturing, a maker of interchangeable shotgun chokes, uses a conical portion about three times the bore diameter in length, so the shot is gradually squeezed down with minimal deformation. The cylindrical section is shorter, usually 0.6 to 0.75 inches (15 to 19 millimetres). The use of interchangeable chokes has made it easy to tune the performance of a given combination of shotgun and shotshell to achieve the desired performance.

The choke should be tailored to the range and size of the targets. A skeet shooter shooting at close targets might use 127 micrometres (0.005 inches) of constriction to produce a 76 cm (30 in) diameter pattern at a distance of 19 m (21 yd). A trap shooter shooting at distant targets might use 762 micrometres (0.030 inches) of constriction to produce a 76 cm (30 in) diameter pattern at 37 m (40 yd). Special chokes for turkey hunting, which requires long range shots at the small head and neck of the bird, can go as high as 1500 micrometres (0.060 inches). The use of too much choke and a small pattern increases the difficulty of hitting the target, whereas the use of too little choke produces large patterns with insufficient pellet density to reliably break targets or kill game. "Cylinder barrels" have no constriction.

Table of shotgun chokes for a 12-gauge shotgun using lead shot
Constriction (micrometres)	Constriction (inches)	American name	British name	Percentage of shot in a 76 cm (30 in) circle at 37 m (40 yd)	Total spread at 37 m (cm)	Total spread at 40 yds (in)	Effective range (m)	Effective range (yd)
0	.000	Cylinder		40	150	59	18	20
127	.005	Skeet	1/8	45	132	52	21	23
254	.010	Improved Cylinder	1/4	50	124	49	23	25
381	.015	Light Modified						
508	.020	Modified	1/2	60	117	46	32	35
635	.025	Improved Modified	3/4					
762	.030	Light Full			109	43		
889	.035	Full	Full	70			37	40
1143	.045	Extra Full						
1270	.050	Super Full						

Other specialized choke tubes exist as well. Some turkey hunting tubes have constrictions greater than "Super Full", or additional features like porting to reduce recoil, or "straight rifling" that is designed to stop any spin that the shot column might acquire when traveling down the barrel. These tubes are often extended, meaning they project beyond the end of the bore, giving more room for things like a longer conical section. Shot spreaders or diffusion chokes work the opposite way of normal chokes — they are designed to spread the shot more than a cylinder bore, generating wider patterns for very short range use. A number of recent spreader chokes, such as the Briley "Diffusion" line, actually use rifling in the choke to spin the shot slightly, creating a wider spread. The Briley Diffusion uses a 1 rotation in 36 cm (14 in) twist, as does the FABARM Lion Paradox shotgun.

Oval chokes, which are designed to provide a shot pattern wider than it is tall, are sometimes found on combat shotguns, primarily those of the Vietnam War era. They were available for aftermarket addition in the 1970s from companies like A & W Engineering. Military versions of the Ithaca 37 with duckbill choke were used in limited numbers during the Vietnam War by U.S. Navy Seals. It arguably increased effectiveness in close range engagements against multiple targets. Two major disadvantages plagued the system; one was erratic patterning, and the second was that the shot would spread too quickly, providing a limited effective zone.

Offset chokes, where the pattern is intentionally slightly off of center, are used to change the point of impact. For instance, an offset choke can be used to make a double-barreled shotgun with poorly aligned barrels hit the same spot with both barrels.

=== Barrel length ===
Shotguns generally have longer barrels than modern rifles. Unlike rifles, however, the long shotgun barrel is not for ballistic purposes; shotgun shells use small powder charges in large diameter bores, and this leads to very low muzzle pressures (see internal ballistics) and very little velocity change with increasing barrel length. According to Remington, modern powder in a shotgun combusts completely in 25 to 36 cm (10–14 in) barrels.

Since shotguns are generally used for shooting at small, fast-moving targets, it is important to lead the target by firing slightly ahead of the target, so that when the shot reaches the range of the target, the target will have moved into the pattern.

Shotguns made for close ranges, where the angular speed of the targets is great (such as skeet or upland bird hunting), tend to have shorter barrels, around 24 to 28 inches (61–71 cm). Shotguns for longer range shooting, where angular speeds are small (trap shooting; quail, pheasant, and waterfowl hunting), tend to have longer barrels, 28 to 36 inches (91 cm). The longer barrels have more angular momentum, and will therefore swing more slowly but more steadily. The short, low angular momentum barrels swing faster, but are less steady. These lengths are for pump or semi-auto shotguns; break-open guns have shorter overall lengths for the same barrel length, and so will use longer barrels. The break-open design saves between 8 and 15 cm (3–6 in) in overall length, but in most cases pays for this by having two barrels, which adds weight at the muzzle. Barrels for shotguns have been getting longer as modern steels and production methods make the barrels stronger and lighter; a longer, lighter barrel gives the same inertia for less overall weight.

Shotguns for use against larger, slower targets generally have even shorter barrels. Small game shotguns, for hunting game like rabbits and squirrels, or shotguns for use with buckshot for deer, are often 56 to 61 cm (22–24 in).

Shotguns intended for all-round hunting are a compromise, but a 72 to 74 cm (28–29 in) barrel pump-action 12-gauge shotgun with a modified choke can serve admirably for use as one gun intended for general all-round hunting of small-game such as quails, rabbits, pheasants, doves, and squirrels in semi-open wooded or farmland areas in many parts of the eastern U.S. (Kentucky, Indiana, Tennessee) where dense brush is less of a hindrance and the ability to have more reach is important. For hunting in dense brush, shorter barrel lengths are often preferred when hunting the same types of game.

=== Caliber conversion sleeves ===
Shotguns are well suited for the use of caliber conversion sleeves, allowing most single- and double-barrel shotguns to fire a wide range of ammunition. The X Caliber system consists of eight adapter sleeves that allow the 12-gauge models to fire: .380 ACP, 9mm Luger, .38 Special, .357 Magnum, .40 S&W, .44 Special, .44 Magnum, .45 ACP, .45 Long Colt, .410 gauge and 20-gauge ammunition. They even make four adapter sleeves that allow the 20-gauge models to fire: 9mm Luger, .38 Special, .357 Magnum, .45 ACP, .45 Long Colt, and .410 gauge ammunition.

== Ammunition ==
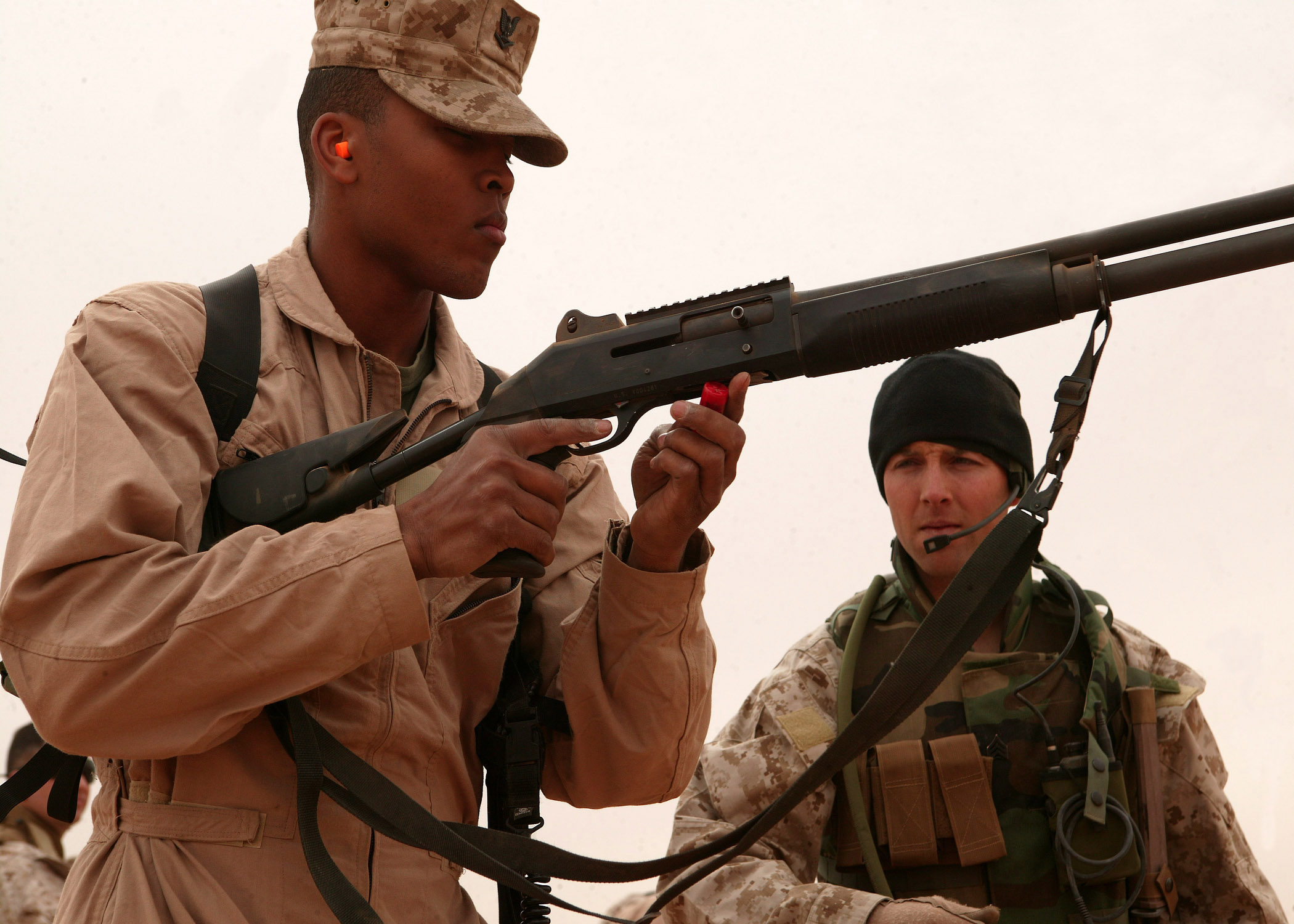
A U.S. Navy corpsman loading 12-gauge shells into an M1014 semi-automatic shotgun

The extremely large caliber of shotgun shells has led to a wide variety of different ammunition.

Shotshells are the most commonly used round, filled with lead or lead substitute pellets.

Of this general class, the most common subset is birdshot, which uses a large number (from dozens to hundreds) of small pellets, meant to create a wide "kill spread" to hunt birds in flight. Shotshells are described by the size and number of the pellets within, and numbered in reverse order (the smaller the number, the bigger the pellet size, similar to bore gauge). Size nine (#9) shot is the smallest size normally used for hunting and is used on small upland game birds such as dove and quail. Larger sizes are used for hunting larger upland game birds and waterfowl.

Buckshot is similar to but larger than birdshot, and was originally designed for hunting larger game, such as deer (hence the name). While the advent of new, more accurate slug technologies is making buckshot less attractive for hunting, it is still the most common choice for police, military, and home defense uses. Like birdshot, buckshot is described by pellet size, with larger numbers indicating smaller shot. From the smallest to the largest, buckshot sizes are: #4, (called "number four"), #1, 0 ("one-aught"), 00 ("double-aught"), 000 ("triple-aught") and 0000 ("four-aught"). A typical round for defensive use would be a 12-gauge 2 3/4-inch (7.0 cm) length 00 buck shell, which contains 9 pellets roughly 8.4 millimetres (0.33 in) in diameter, each comparable to a .38 Special bullet in damage potential. New "tactical" buckshot rounds, designed specifically for defensive use, use slightly fewer shot at lower velocity to reduce recoil and increase controllability of the shotgun. There are some shotgun rounds designed specifically for police use that shoot effectively from 50 yards (46 m) with a 20-inch-diameter (510 mm) grouping of the balls.

Slug rounds are rounds that fire a single solid slug. They are used for hunting large game and in certain military and law enforcement applications. Modern slugs are moderately accurate, especially when fired from special rifled slug barrels. They are often used in "shotgun-only" hunting zones near inhabited areas, where rifles are prohibited due to their greater range.

Sabots are a common type of slug round. While some slugs are exactly that—a 12-gauge metal projectile in a cartridge—a sabot is a smaller but more aerodynamic projectile surrounded by a "shoe" of some other material. This "sabot" jacket seals the barrel, increasing pressure and acceleration, while also inducing spin on the projectile in a rifled barrel. Once the projectile clears the barrel, the sabot material falls away, leaving an unmarked, aerodynamic bullet to continue toward the target. The advantages over a traditional slug are increased shot power, increased bullet velocity due to the lighter-mass bullet, and increased accuracy due to the velocity and the reduction in deformation of the slug itself. Disadvantages versus a traditional slug include lower muzzle momentum due to reduced mass, reduced damage due to smaller bullet diameter, and significantly higher per-unit cost.

=== Specialty ammunition ===
The unique properties of the shotgun, such as large case capacity, large bore, and the lack of rifling, has led to the development of a large variety of specialty shells, ranging from novelties to high-tech military rounds.

==== Hunting, defensive, and military ====
Brenneke and Foster type slugs have the same basic configuration as normal slugs but have increased accuracy. The hollowed rear of the Foster slug improves accuracy by placing more mass in the front of the projectile, therefore inhibiting the "tumble" that normal slugs may generate. The Brenneke slug takes this concept a bit further, with the addition of a wad that stays connected to the projectile after discharge, increasing accuracy. Both slugs are commonly found with fins or ribs, which are meant to allow the projectile to safely squeeze down during passage through chokes, but they do not increase stability in flight.

Flechette rounds contain aerodynamic darts, typically from 8 to 20 in number. The flechettes provide greatly extended range due to their aerodynamic shape and improved penetration of light armor. American troops during the Vietnam War packed their own flechette shotgun rounds, called beehive rounds after the similar artillery rounds. However, terminal performance was poor due to the very light weight of the flechettes, and their use was quickly dropped.

Grenade rounds use exploding projectiles to increase long range lethality. These are currently experimental, but the British FRAG-12, which comes in High Explosive (HE), High Explosive Armor-piercing (HEAP) and High Explosive Fragmenting Antipersonnel (HEFA) forms, is under consideration by military forces.

==== Less-lethal rounds, for riot and animal control ====
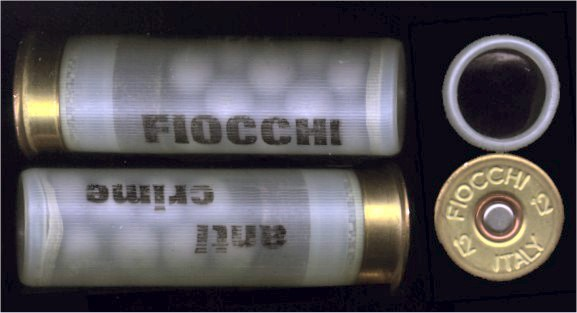
Two rounds of Fiocchi 12-gauge rubber buckshot

Flexible baton rounds, commonly called bean bags, fire a fabric bag filled with birdshot or a similar loose, dense substance. The "punch" effect of the bag is useful for knocking down targets; the rounds are used by police to subdue violent suspects. The bean bag round is by far the most common less-lethal round used. Due to the large surface area of these rounds, they lose velocity rapidly, and must be used at fairly short ranges to be effective, though use at extremely short ranges, under 3 m (9.8 ft), can result in broken bones or other serious or lethal injuries. The rounds can also fly in a frisbee-like fashion and cut the person or animal being fired at. For this reason, these types of rounds are referred to as less-lethal, as opposed to less-than-lethal.

Gas shells spray a cone of gas for several meters. These are primarily used by riot police. They normally contain pepper gas or tear gas. Other variations launch a gas-grenade-like projectile.

Rock salt shells are hand loaded with coarse rock salt crystals, replacing the standard lead or steel shot. Rock salt shells could be seen as the forerunners of modern less-lethal rounds. In the United States, rock salt shells were and are sometimes still used by rural civilians to defend their property. The brittle salt was unlikely to cause serious injury at long ranges, but would cause painful stinging injuries and served as a warning. British gamekeepers have used rock salt shells to deter poachers. Rather than get into a physical confrontation, they stalk the poachers, making themselves known by a loud shout of "Run!" just before firing, to avoid hitting the now fleeing subject in the eyes.

Rubber slugs or rubber buckshot are similar in principle to the bean bag rounds. Composed of flexible rubber or plastic and fired at low velocities, these rounds are probably the most common choice for riot control.

Taser International announced in 2007 a new 12-gauge eXtended Range Electronic Projectile or XREP, which contains a small electroshock weapon unit in a carrier that can be fired from a standard 12-gauge shotgun. The XREP projectile is fin stabilized, and travels at an initial velocity of 100 m/s (300 ft/s). Barbs on the front attach the electroshock unit to the target, with a tassel deploying from the rear to widen the circuit. A twenty-second burst of electrical energy is delivered to the target. This product was expected to be released to market in 2008. They were used—despite still being subject to testing, in breach of the supplier's license—by Northumbria police in their standoff with Raoul Moat in 2010.

Breaching rounds, often called frangible, Disintegrator, or Hatton rounds, are designed to destroy door locking mechanisms without risking lives. They are constructed of a very brittle substance that transfers most of the energy to the primary target but then fragment into much smaller pieces or dust so as not to injure unseen targets such as hostages or non-combatants that may be standing behind a breached door.

Bird bombs are low-powered rounds that fire a firecracker that is fused to explode a short time after firing. They are designed to scare animals, such as birds that congregate on airport runways.

Screechers fire a pyrotechnic whistle that emits a loud whistling sound for the duration of its flight. These are also used to scare animals.

Blank shells contain only a small amount of powder and no actual load. When fired, the blanks provide the sound and flash of a real load, but with no projectile. These may be used for simulation of gunfire, scaring wildlife, or as power for a launching device such as the Mossberg #50298 marine line launcher.

Stinger is a type of shotgun shell which contains sixteen 00-buck balls made of Zytel, and is designed as a non-lethal ammunition ideally used in small spaces.

==== Novelty and other ====
Bolo rounds are made of two or more slugs molded onto steel wire. When fired, the slugs separate, pulling the wire taut creating a flying blade, which could theoretically decapitate people and animals or amputate limbs. However, many active shotgun users consider this to be overstated, and view bolo shells as being less effective than conventional ammunition. Bolo shell rounds are banned in many locations (including the U.S. states of Florida and Illinois) due to concerns about their potential lethality. The round is named in reference to bolas, which use two or more weighted balls on a rope to trap cattle or game.

Dragon's breath usually refers to a zirconium-based pyrotechnic shotgun round. When fired, a gout of flame erupts from the barrel of the gun (up to 20 feet or 6 metres). The visual effect it produces is impressive, similar to that of a short-ranged flamethrower. However, it has few tactical uses, mainly distraction/disorientation.

Flare rounds are sometimes carried by hunters for safety and rescue purposes. They are available in low- and high-altitude versions. Some brands claim they can reach a height of up to 200 m (660 ft).

== Uses ==
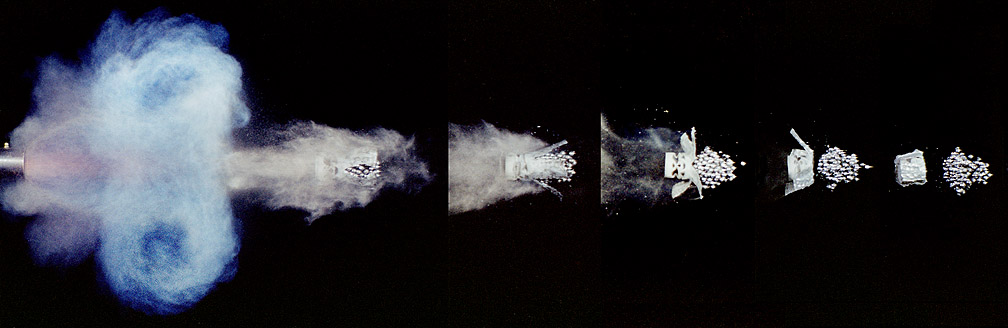
Series of individual 1/1,000,000-second exposures showing shotgun firing shot and wadding separation

The typical use of a shotgun is against small and fast-moving targets, often while in the air. The spreading of the shot allows the user to point the shotgun close to the target, rather than having to aim precisely as in the case of a single projectile. The disadvantages of shot are limited range and limited penetration of the shot, which is why shotguns are used at short ranges, and typically against smaller targets. Larger shot sizes, up to the extreme case of the single projectile slug load, result in increased penetration, but at the expense of fewer projectiles and lower probability of hitting the target.

Aside from the most common use against small, fast-moving targets, the shotgun has several advantages when used against still targets. First, it has enormous stopping power at short range, more than nearly all handguns and many rifles. Though many believe the shotgun is a great firearm for inexperienced shooters, the truth is, at close range, the spread of shot is not very large at all, and competency in aiming is still required. A typical self-defense load of buckshot contains 8–27 large lead pellets, resulting in many wound tracks in the target. Also, unlike a fully jacketed rifle bullet, each pellet of shot is less likely to penetrate walls and hit bystanders (though in the case of traditional 00-Buck, overpenetration of soft and hard targets may be an issue). It is favored by law enforcement for its low penetration and high stopping power.

On the other hand, the hit potential of a defensive shotgun is often overstated. The typical defensive shot is taken at very close ranges, at which the shot charge expands no more than a few centimeters. This means the shotgun must still be aimed at the target with some care. Balancing this is the fact that shot spreads further upon entering the target, and the multiple wound channels are far more likely to produce a disabling wound than a rifle or handgun.

=== Sporting ===
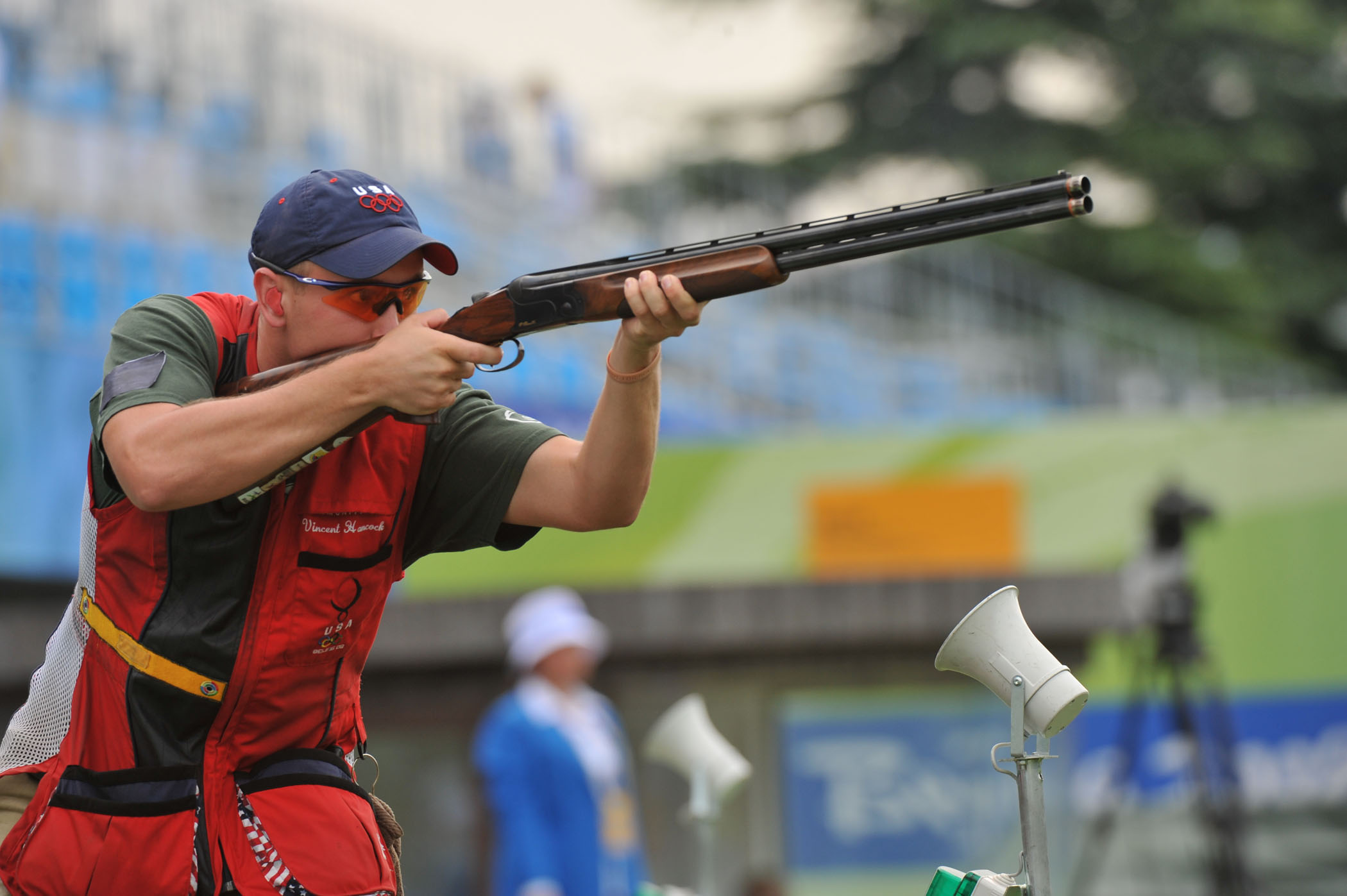
Vincent Hancock in the men's skeet finals at the 2008 Summer Olympics

Some of the most common uses of shotguns are the sports of skeet shooting, trap shooting, and sporting clays. These involve shooting clay discs, also known as clay pigeons, thrown in by hand and by machine. Both skeet and trap competitions are featured at the Olympic Games.

=== Hunting ===
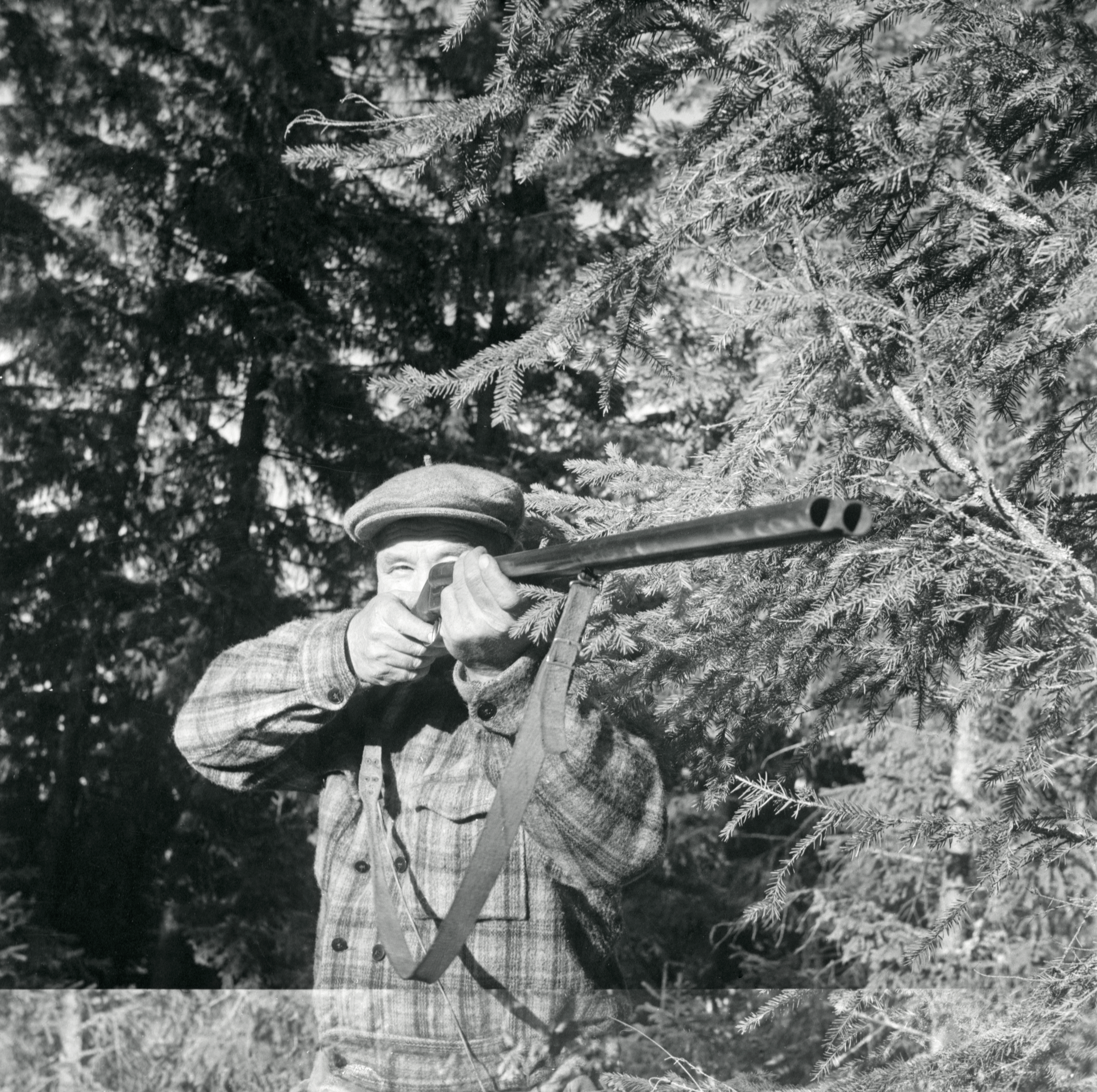
A Finnish hunter with shotgun in 1956

The shotgun is popular for bird hunting (called "game-shooting" in the United Kingdom, where "hunting" refers to hunting mammals with a pack of hounds), it is also used for more general forms of hunting especially in semi-populated areas where the range of rifle bullets may pose a hazard. Use of a smoothbore shotgun with a rifled slug or, alternatively, a rifled barrel shotgun with a sabot slug, improves accuracy to 100 m (110 yd) or more. This is well within the range of the majority of kill shots by experienced hunters using shotguns.

However, given the relatively low muzzle velocity of slug ammunition, typically around 500 m/s (about 1600 feet per second), and the blunt, poorly streamlined shape of typical slugs (which cause them to lose velocity very rapidly, compared to rifle bullets), a hunter must pay close attention to the ballistics of the particular ammunition used to ensure an effective and humane kill shot.

At any reasonable range, shotgun slugs make effective lethal wounds due to their tremendous mass, reducing the length of time that an animal might suffer. For example, a typical 12-gauge shotgun slug is a blunt piece of metal that could be described as an 18 mm (.729 inch) caliber that weighs 28 grams (432 grains). For comparison, a common deer-hunting rifle round is a 7.62 mm (.308 inch) slug weighing 9.7 grams (150 grains), but the dynamics of the rifle cartridge allow for a different type of wound, and a much further reach.

Shotguns are often used with rifled barrels in locations where it is not lawful to hunt with a rifle. Typically, a sabot slug is used in these barrels for maximum accuracy and performance. Shotguns are often used to hunt whitetail deer in the thick brush and briers of the Southeastern and upper Midwestern United States, where, due to the dense cover, ranges tend to be close – 25m or less.

Sabot slugs are essentially very large hollow point bullets, and are streamlined for maximum spin and accuracy when shot through a rifled barrel. They have greater ranges than older Foster and Brenneke-type slugs.

People often use semiautomatic or pump-action shotguns for hunting waterfowl to small game.

=== Industrial ===
Another use are industrial shotguns, used for buildup of slag in kilns. They are similar in usage but differ than powder-actuated tools. These are also used in the mining and cement industry for knocking down overhands and residue buildup, etc. A known example of an industrial shotgun is the 8-gauge Remington MasterBlaster.

=== Law enforcement ===
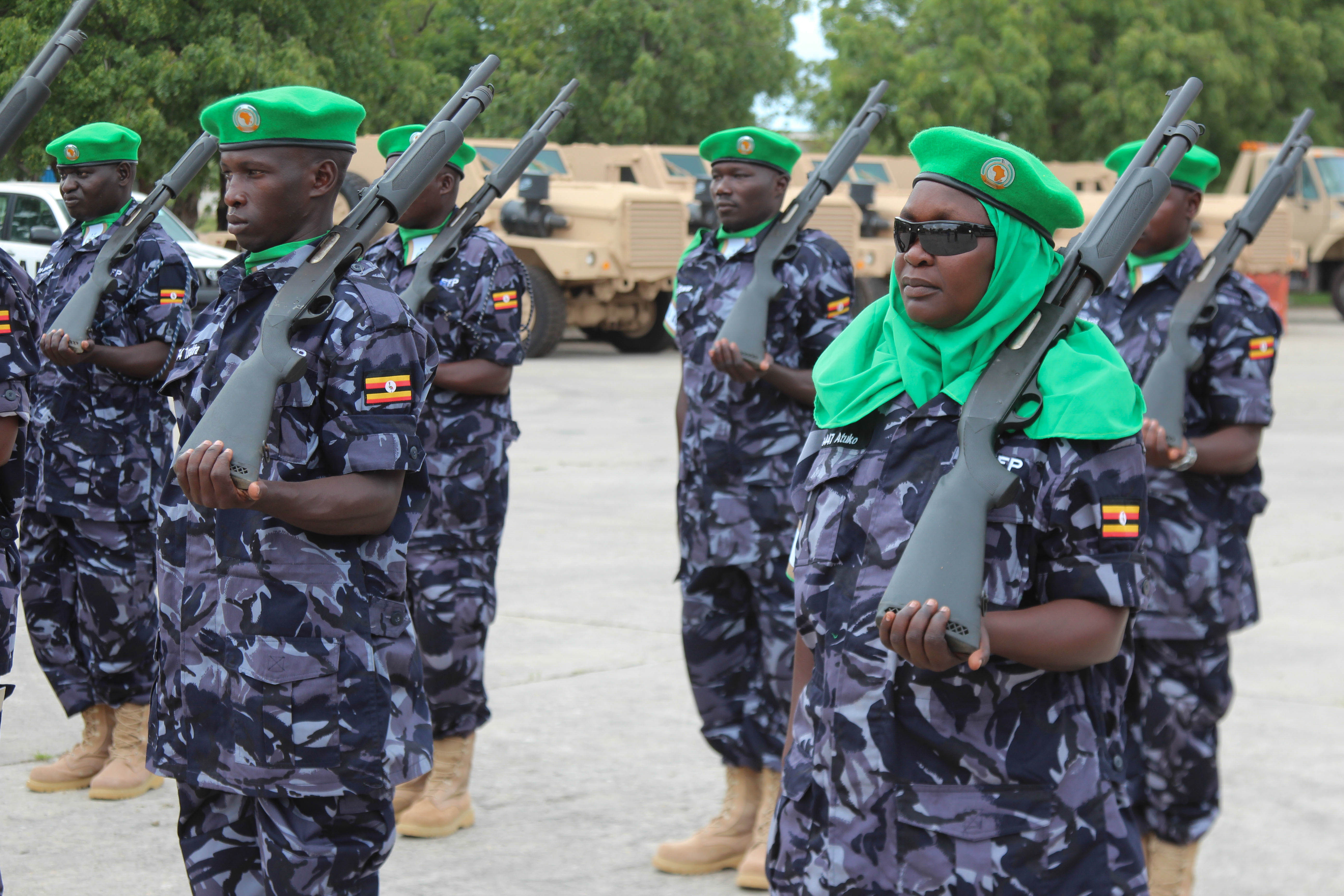
Ugandan AMISOM police armed with shotguns

In many countries, especially the United States and Canada, shotguns are widely used as a support weapon by police forces. One of the rationales for issuing shotguns is that, even without much training, an officer will probably be able to hit targets at close to intermediate range, due to the "spreading" effect of buckshot. This is largely a myth, as the spread of buckshot at 25 feet averages 8 inches, which is still very capable of missing a target. Some police forces are replacing shotguns in this role with carbine rifles such as AR-15s. Shotguns are also used in roadblock situations, where police are blocking a highway to search cars for suspects. In the U.S., law enforcement agencies often use riot shotguns, especially for crowd and riot control where they may be loaded with less-lethal rounds such as rubber bullets or bean bags. Shotguns are also often used as breaching devices to defeat locks.

=== Military ===
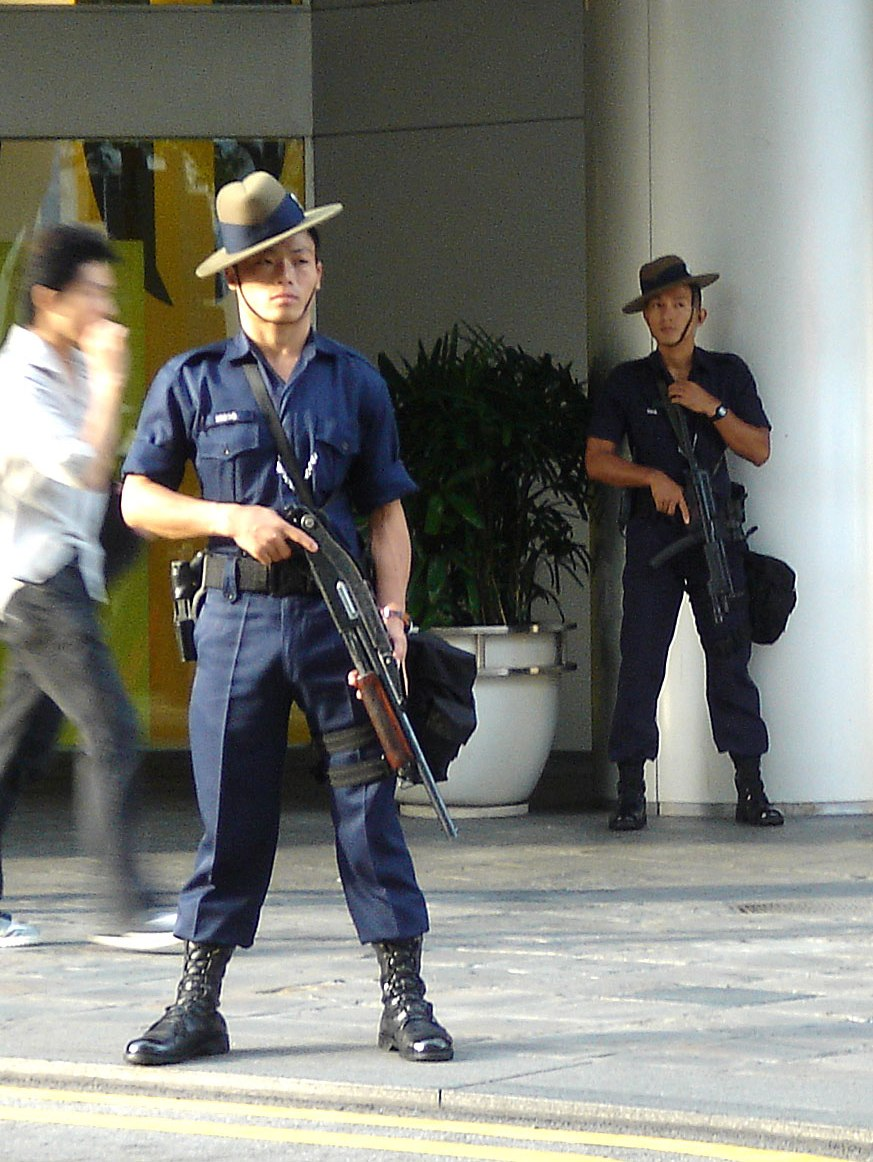
A Gurkha Contingent trooper in Singapore armed with a folding stock pump shotgun

Shotguns are common weapons in military use, particularly for special purposes. Shotguns are found aboard naval vessels for shipboard security, because the weapon is very effective at close range as a way of repelling enemy boarding parties. In a naval setting, stainless steel shotguns are often used, because regular steel is more prone to corrosion in the marine environment. Shotguns are also used by military police units. U.S. Marines have used shotguns since their inception at the squad level, often in the hands of NCOs, while the U.S. Army often issued them to a squad's point man. Shotguns were modified for and used in the trench warfare of World War I, in the jungle combat of World War II and the Vietnam War. Shotguns were also used in the Iraq War, being popular with soldiers in urban combat environments. Some U.S. units in Iraq used shotguns with special frangible breaching rounds to blow the locks or hinges off doors when making a surprise entry into a dwelling.

Recently, shotguns have proven to be one of the few effective means of repelling incoming drones in military conflicts due to their heightened ability to shoot and hit fast and small targets with the use of pelletted ammo such as buckshot and birdshot shells.

=== Home and personal defense ===
Shotguns are a popular means of home defense for many of the same reasons they are preferred for close-quarters tasks in law enforcement and the military.

== Legal issues ==
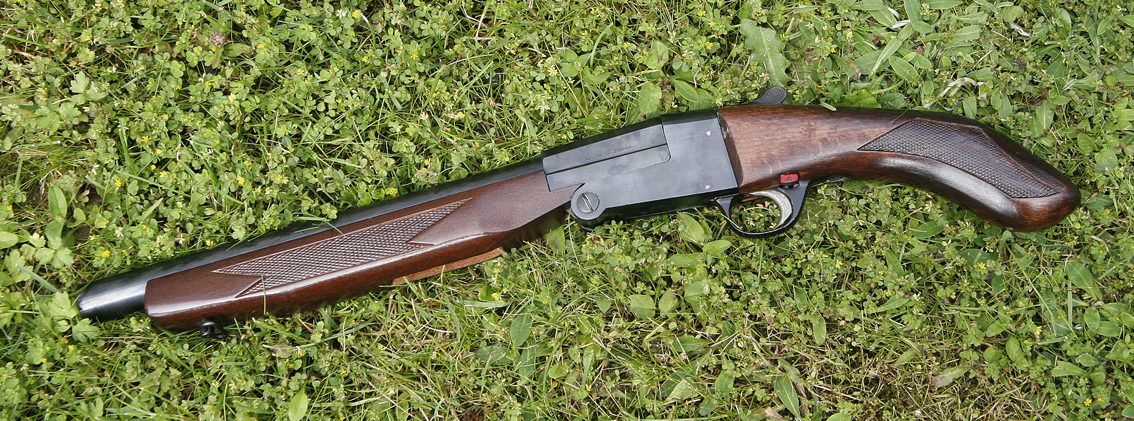
A homemade lupara

Globally, shotguns are generally not as heavily regulated as rifles or handguns, likely because they lack the range of rifles and are not easily concealable as handguns are; thus, they are perceived as a lesser threat by legislative authorities. The main exception is a sawed-off shotgun, especially a lupara, as it is more easily concealed than a normal shotgun.

=== Australia ===
Within Australia, all shotguns manufactured after 1 January 1901 are considered firearms and are subject to registration and licensing. Most shotguns (including break-action, bolt-action and lever-action shotguns) are classed as "Category A" weapons and, as such, are comparatively easy to obtain a licence for, given a legally recognised "legitimate reason" (compare to the British requirement for "good reason" for a FAC), such as sport shooting or hunting. However, pump-action and semi-automatic shotguns are classed as "Category C" (magazine capacity no more than 5 rounds) or "Category D" (magazine capacity more than 5 rounds) weapons; a licence for this type of firearm is, practically speaking, unavailable to the average citizen due to the difficulty and red tape of acquiring one. For more information, see gun politics in Australia.

=== Canada ===
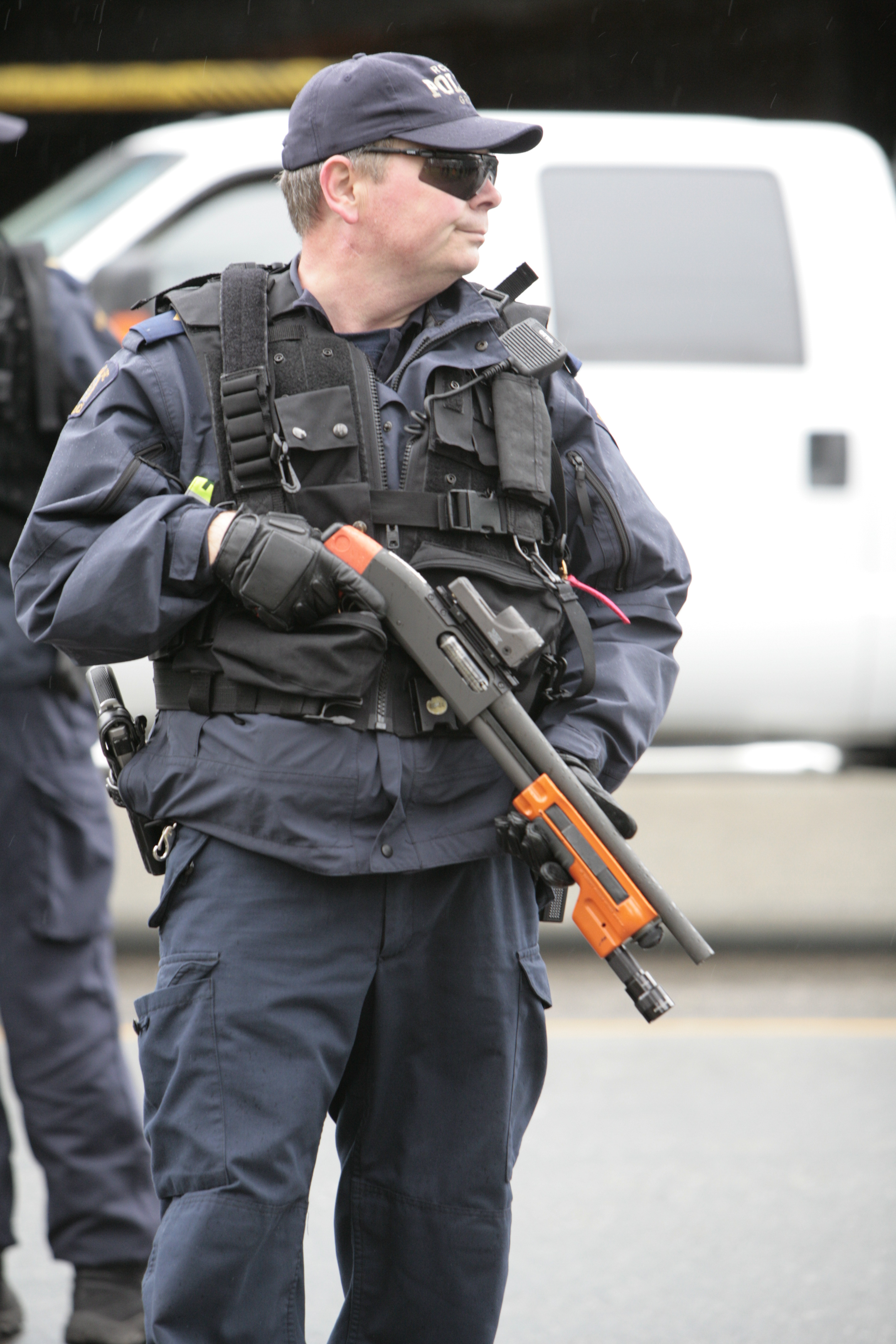
An RCMP officer in 2010 armed with a shotgun outfitted to fire beanbag rounds

Canada has three classifications of firearms: non-restricted, restricted, and prohibited. Shotguns are found in all three classes.

All non-restricted shotguns must have an overall length of at least 660 mm (26 in). Semi-automatic shotguns must also have a barrel length of no less than 469.9 mm (18.50 in) and with a capacity of 5 shells or less in the magazine to remain non-restricted. All other shotgun action types (pump/slide, break open, lever, bolt) do not have a magazine limit restriction or a minimum barrel length provided the overall length of the firearm remains more than 660 mm (26 in) and the barrel was produced by an approved manufacturer. Shotgun barrels may only be reduced in length to a minimum of 457 mm (18.0 in). Non-restricted shotguns may be possessed with any Possession and Acquisition Licence (PAL) or Possession-Only License (POL) and may be transported throughout the country without special authorization and may be used for hunting certain species at certain times of the year.

Semi-automatic shotguns with a barrel length of less than 469.9 mm (18.50 in) are considered restricted and any shotgun that has been altered so its barrel length is less than 457 mm (18.0 in) or if its overall length is less than 660 mm (26 in) is considered prohibited. Restricted and prohibited shotguns may be possessed with a PAL or POL that has been endorsed for restricted or prohibited grandfathered firearms. These shotguns require special Authorization to Transport (ATT).

The Canadian Firearms Registry was a government-run registry of all legally owned firearms in Canada. The government provided amnesty from prosecution to shotgun and rifle owners if they fail to register non-restricted shotguns and rifles. The long gun portion of the registry was scrapped in 2011.

See online for an official Canadian list of non-restricted and restricted and prohibited firearms.

=== United Kingdom ===
In the United Kingdom, a Shotgun Certificate (SGC) is required to possess a "Section 2" shotgun. These cost £50 and can only be denied if the chief of police in the area believes and can prove that the applicant poses a real danger to the public, or if the applicant has been convicted of a crime punishable by imprisonment for a term of three years or more or if the applicant cannot securely store a shotgun (gun clamps, wire locks and locking gun cabinets are considered secure). The round number restrictions apply only to the magazine, not the chamber, so it is legal to have a single-barreled semi-auto or pump-action shotgun that holds more than 3 rounds in total, or a shotgun with separate chambers (which would need to also be multi-barrelled). For a shotgun to qualify as a section 2 shotgun, it must meet the following criteria:

1. has a barrel not less than 24 inches (610 mm) in length and does not have any barrel with a bore more than 2 inches (51 mm) in diameter;
2. either has no magazine or has a non-detachable magazine not capable of holding more than 2 cartridges;
3. is not a revolver gun.

Prior to an SGC being issued, an interview is conducted with the local Firearms Officer. In the past, this was a duty undertaken by the local police, but after the 1984 PACE Act and 1992 PEACE Act this function has been shifting more out to civilian staff. The 1984 PACE Act was established after many injustices occurring in the 1970s, and provided (and provides) protection to the citizens and their privacy whether free or detained. This act pushes for "interviews" to be conducted, rather than interrogations. These interviews must be recorded and on record, and the officer is not allowed to hide parts of said interview or evidence. The 1992 PEACE Act added upon this, which pushed for more of an "interview" rather than a sometimes coercive interrogation that may result in a false positive when it comes to crime. According to the U.S. Department of Justice's journal on the effects of these acts, they have reduced turnout of information gained from said interviews, and now almost only novice offender is likely to give information and be affected by said interviews according to a study in 1986. In the process the officer will check the location and suitability of the gun safe that is to be used for storage and they (or an "interview specialist") will conduct a general interview to establish the reasons behind the applicant requiring an SGC.

An SGC holder can own any number of shotguns meeting these requirements so long as he/she can store them securely. No certificate is required to own shotgun ammunition, but one is required to buy it. There is no restriction on the amount of shotgun ammunition that can be bought or owned. There are also no rules regarding the storage of ammunition.

However, shotgun ammunition which contains fewer than 6 projectiles requires a section 1 Firearms Certificate (FAC). Shotguns with a magazine capacity greater than 2 rounds are also considered to be section 1 firearms and, as such, require an FAC to own. An FAC costs £50 but is much more restrictive than an SGC. The applicant must nominate two referees who are known to the applicant to vouch for his or her character; a new 'variation' is required for each new caliber of gun to be owned; limits are set on how much ammunition a person can own at any one time; and an FAC can be denied if the applicant does not have sufficient 'good reason'. 'Good reason' generally means hunting, collecting, or target shooting – though other reasons may be acceptable. Personal defense is not an acceptable reason.

Any pump-action or semi-automatic smoothbore gun (such as a shotgun) with a barrel length of less than 24 inches or total length of less than 40 inches is considered to be a section 5 firearm, that is, one that is subject to general prohibition, unless it is chambered for .22 caliber rimfire ammunition.

=== United States ===
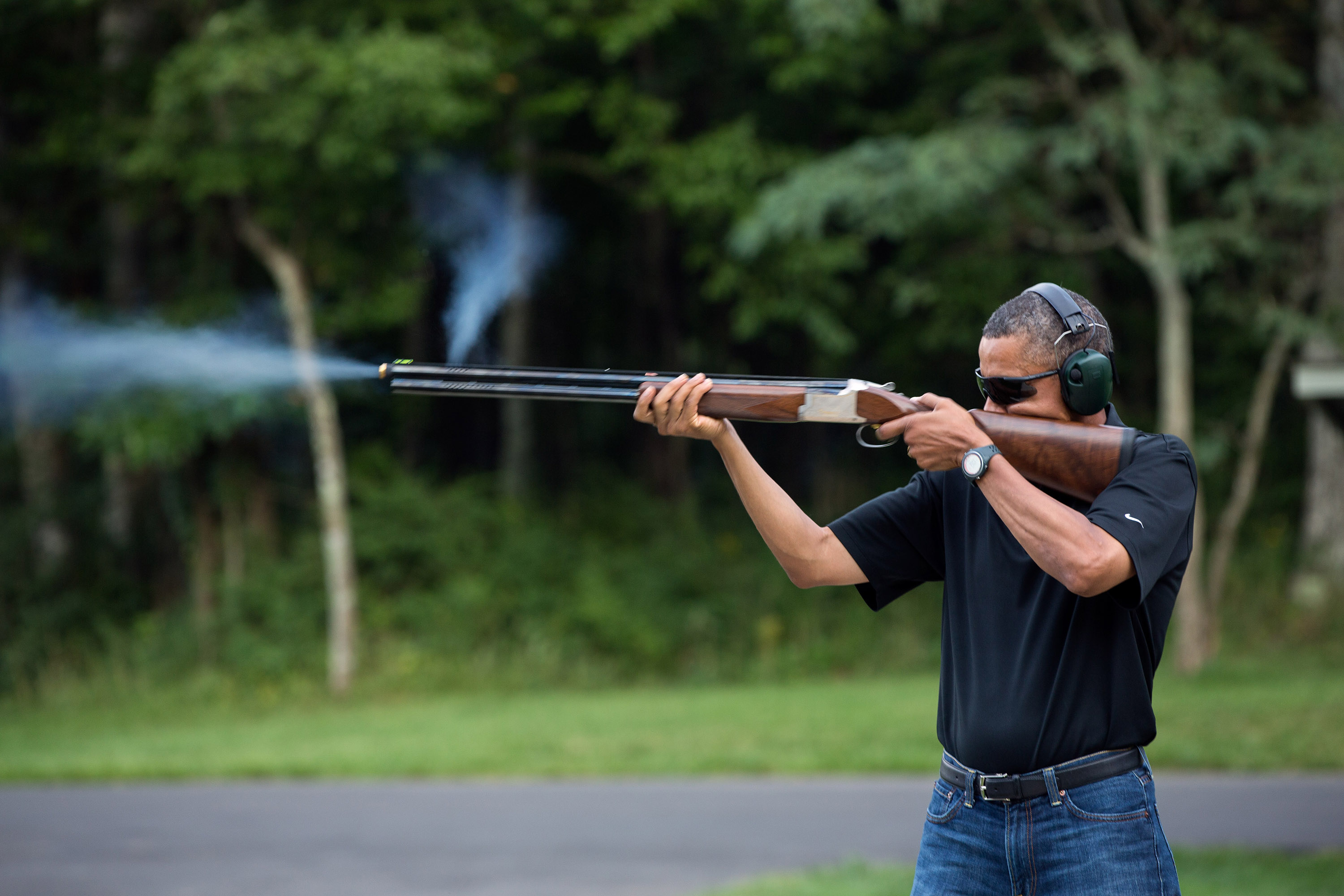
Barack Obama skeet shooting with a Browning Citori 525 on the range at Camp David

In the U.S., federal law prohibits shotguns from being capable of holding more than three shells including the round in the chamber when used for hunting migratory gamebirds such as doves, ducks, and geese. For other uses, a capacity of any number of shells is generally permitted. Most magazine-fed shotguns come with a removable magazine plug to limit the capacity to 2, plus 1 in the chamber, for a total of 3 rounds, while hunting migratory gamebirds. Certain states have restrictions on magazine capacity or design features under hunting or assault weapon laws.

Shotguns intended for defensive use have barrels as short as 18 inches (46 cm) for private use (the minimum shotgun barrel length allowed by law in the United States without federal registration). Barrel lengths of less than 18 inches (46 cm) as measured from the breechface to the muzzle when the weapon is in battery, or have an overall length of less than 26 inches (66 cm) are classified as short-barreled shotguns (SBS) under the 1934 National Firearms Act and are regulated. A similar short-barreled weapon having a pistol grip may be classified as an AOW or "Any Other Weapon" or "Firearm", depending on barrel length. A shotgun is defined as a weapon (with a buttstock) designed to be fired from the shoulder. The classification varies depending on how the weapon was originally manufactured.

Shotguns used by military, police, and other government agencies are regulated under the National Firearms Act of 1934; however, they are exempt from transfer taxes. These weapons commonly have barrels as short as 12 to 14 inches (30 to 36 centimetres) so that they are easier to handle in confined spaces. Non-prohibited private citizens may own short-barreled shotguns by passing extensive background checks (state and local laws may be more restrictive) as well as paying a $200 federal tax and being issued a stamp. Defensive shotguns sometimes have no buttstock or will have a folding stock to reduce overall length even more when required. AOWs transfer with a $5 tax stamp from the BATFE.

== See also ==
- Antique firearms
- Gun safety
- List of shotguns
- Double-barreled shotgun
- Riding shotgun
- Shotgun wedding
- Military 12-gauge cartridges
- Mare's Leg
- Shotgun (shooting sports)
