= Colt model 1839 carbine =

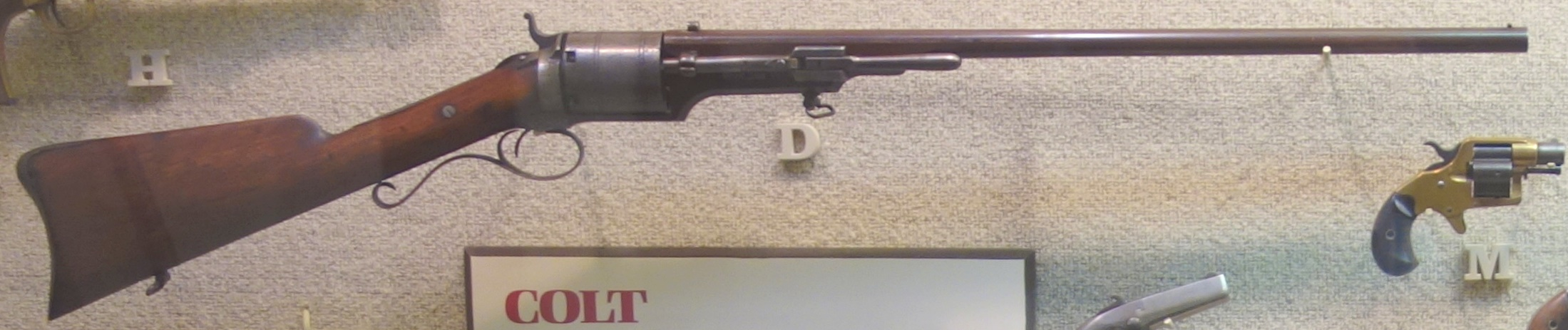
- A surviving example of the early Colt model 1836, a model that preceded the 1839
- Type: Carbine
- Place of origin: United States

Service history
- Used by: United States; Republic of Texas

Production history
- Designer: Samuel Colt
- Manufacturer: Patent Arms Manufacturing Company
- Produced: 1838–1841
- No. built: 950
- Variants: Colt model 1839 shotgun

Specifications
- Mass: 10 1/2 lb (4.8 kg)
- Length: 43 in (110 cm)
- Barrel length: 24 in (61 cm) (rare 28 in (71 cm) and 32 in (81 cm) examples)
- Caliber: .525
- Action: Single-action
- Feed system: 6-round cylinder

The Colt model 1839 carbine is an early percussion revolving smoothbore carbine manufactured by the Patent Arms Manufacturing Company between 1838 and 1841. Produced alongside the Colt second model ring lever rifle (preceded by the first model ring lever rifle, Samuel Colt's first manufactured firearm), the model 1839 was the most popular longarm of the Patent Arms period. The model 1839 carbine is differentiated from Colt's ring lever rifles by the lack of a cocking ring lever and the presence of an external hammer, which, when manually cocked, would rotate the six-shot cylinder to the next position. Approximately 950 model 1839 carbines were manufactured, and an additional shotgun variant, the model 1839 shotgun, was produced from 1839 to 1841 with approximately 225 manufactured. Though the United States Navy and the Texas Navy purchased a number of model 1839 carbines, sales suffered due to the gun's high price and quality control issues.

== Overview ==
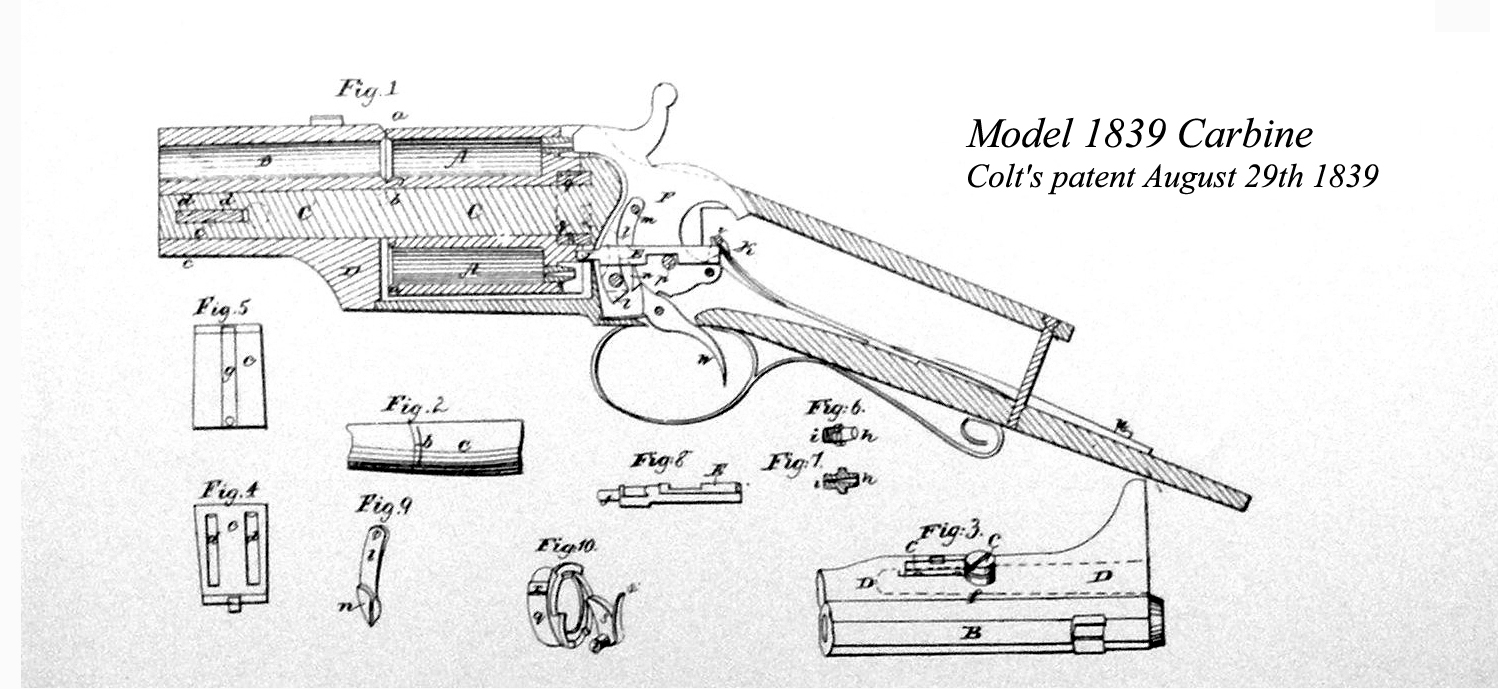
A patent of the Colt model 1839 carbine

The model 1839 carbine features a standard 24-inch (61 cm) round barrel with a browned finish. The other metal parts are blued. Although the 24-inch barrel length is most common, 28-inch (71 cm) and 32-inch (81 cm) lengths were produced. The overall length of the 24-inch carbine is 43 inches (110 cm) and the weight of the firearm is 10 1/2 pounds (4.8 kg). Unlike Colt ring lever rifles, the model 1839 carbine features a smoothbore barrel that is chambered in .525 caliber. The 2 1/2-inch (6.4 cm) six-shot cylinder features an elaborate roll scene including depictions of a naval battle, the Battle of Bunker Hill, and a hunter with lion. The front and rear edges of the cylinder were originally square, though by late production, the rear cylinder edge was rounded. Loading levers affixed to the right side of the frame were not present on early models, becoming standard during mid-production in August 1840. The stock is varnished walnut and the buttplate features a rounded heel.

The trigger guard on the model 1839 carbine is an oval in shape and features a "rearward spur" that continues along the bottom of the stock a short distance before curling back forming a small open circle. The model 1839 is distinguished from the larger ring lever rifles by the lack of a ring lever in front of the trigger guard and the presence of an external hammer. Cocking the external hammer back rotates the cylinder to the next position.

=== Model 1839 shotgun ===
The model 1839 shotgun is similar in appearance and operation to the model 1839 carbine. The shotgun features a 24-inch (61 cm) or 32-inch (81 cm) Damascus barrel. The six-shot cylinder is 3 1/2 inches (8.9 cm) long and features a roll scene which includes depictions of "the American eagle, a deer-hunting sequence, and an Indian with bird hunters." The shotgun is chambered in 16 gauge, (.62 caliber) and lacks an attached loading lever.

=== Refurbished models ===
These models, which were original model 1839 carbines reacquired and refurbished by Colt in 1848, feature unadorned polished cylinders and case hardened furniture. In other aspects, these refurbished models are similarly finished to the original production run model 1839 carbine. Forty carbines were refurbished by Colt in this way.

== Production ==
In 1838, production of the model 1839 carbine began in the Patent Arms Manufacturing Company's factory in Paterson, New Jersey. Production lasted until 1841, with a total of about 950 firearms produced (serial numbers 1–950). Model 1839 shotguns were manufactured from 1839 to 1841, with between 225 and 262 guns produced (serial numbers 1–225 or 262). Approximately twenty-five variants of the model 1839 carbine were manufactured at some point during Patent Arms' tenure that featured an elongated 3 1/4-inch (8.3 cm) cylinder. These models were produced to accommodate a larger musket-sized charge of powder.

== Reception and use ==
Numerous model 1839 carbines were sold to several military organizations, though they were never adopted in any widespread manner. The Texas military was a major customer for Colt's new repeating weapons, purchasing several orders of the model 1839 carbines. The Texas Army purchased fifty carbines on August 3, 1839 for $55 each and an additional thirty carbines on October 5, 1839. Each order included accessories to the guns, such as ball molds and loading levers. Also in 1839, the Texas Navy ordered 180 of Colt's model 1839 carbines. The United States Navy purchased 360 carbines between 1840 and 1841 via four separate orders. These firearms were marked "WAT" by military inspector Captain William Anderson Thornton. Tests conducted by the Navy demonstrated the delicacy of the carbine after only 160 carbines had been delivered by mid-1841.

In 1841, Captain Edwin Vose Sumner conducted field trials with the Colt model 1839 carbine and the Jenks carbine at Carlisle Barracks in Pennsylvania. Sumner's early tests of the two carbines led him to favor the Jenks, which he found to be "twelve rounds quicker than the Colt's carbines". Ultimately, Sumner found the Colt model 1839 carbine to be inadequate for military service. Over time, it was found that the cylinders of the Colt carbine began to corrode due in part to material issues. This caused small holes to develop between the chambers that enabled chain fires to occur. Despite the model 1839's improvements in operation over Colt's ring lever rifles and high regard by Samuel Colt, the carbine failed to fulfill Colt's expectations. In addition to some of the aforementioned quality control problems, the carbine's high price proved undesirable for many consumers leading to fewer sales than expected.

The model 1839 carbine most likely saw action with the United States Marine Corps during the Mexican–American War. The carbines saw action during Winfield Scott's Mexico City campaign beginning with the landings at Veracruz and continuing inland towards Mexico City.
