= FRAG-12 =

Type of shotgun shell

A FRAG-12 with the fins deployed.

The FRAG-12 is a specialized 12-gauge shotgun shell which contains a small amount of high explosive to breach intermediate barriers, defeat light armored vehicles, and disrupt IEDs. The shell was designed by the Special Cartridge Company in London, England. Later its patent extended to Olympic Technologies Ltd in Gibraltar.

The shell uses a 50 mm (2.0 in) long metal body filled with 3.4 g (0.12 oz) of composition A5. Four folding fins spring out after leaving the muzzle. The shell arms at 3 metres (9.8 ft) and explodes on impact by a MIL SPEC 1316 fuze. It has a maximum range of 200 metres (660 ft).

A company called Combined Systems, Inc. sells FRAG-12 under the name FRAG12HE. The rounds have low popularity due to a relative high cost to performance ratio, limited application, and being limited to military-only purchase. Sales seem to be limited because of the wide array of other available rounds for military users in more suitable calibers, such as 20×30 mmB K-11, 20×42 mmB PAW 20, 25×40 mmB XM25, 25×59 mmB LW25, 30×29 mmB VOG-17, 35 mm CL DFS10 VOG-17, 35×32 mmSR DF87, 40 mm CL VOG-25M, 40×46 mmSR LV, 40×51 mmSR MV, 40×53 mmSR HV and 40 mm CL Balkan calibers used by the M203, M320, Milkor MGL, AG-C/EGLM, GP-25, and similar dedicated grenade launcher devices. The round was widely advertised with the Atchisson AA-12 assault shotgun.
