= Kpist =

Kpist (Swedish pronunciation: [ˈkôːpɪst]), short for kulsprutepistol, is a Swedish abbreviation for submachine gun. The name may refer to:

- the Carl Gustav M/45, also known as the Kpist m/45, a Swedish submachine gun used by American special operations forces during the Vietnam War.
- Kpist (band), a Swedish electronic rock band
