= New Nambu M66 =

New Nambu M65/M66
- Type: Submachine gun
- Place of origin: Japan

Production history
- Designer: Shin-Chuō Industries (Now Minebea)
- Designed: 1965
- Manufacturer: Shin-Chuō Industries
- No. built: Prototypes Only
- Variants: M65, M66

Specifications
- Mass: 4.08 kg (M65); 3.96 kg (M66)
- Length: M65: 763mm (Stock Folded: 501mm); M66: 756mm (Stock Folded: 504mm)
- Barrel length: 154mm (M65); 140mm (M66)
- Cartridge: 9×19mm Parabellum
- Caliber: 9mm
- Action: Blowback, Open-Bolt
- Rate of fire: 550 RPM (M65); 465 RPM (M66)
- Feed system: 30-Round Detachable Box Magazine
- Sights: Iron Sight

The New Nambu M65/M66 (originally called the SCK-65/66) is a Japanese submachine gun manufactured in 1965 by Shin-Chuō Koygo Industries (formerly Nambu Arms Manufacturing Company; now Minebea).

== Design ==
The New Nambu M66 is blowback operated, and fires from an open bolt. It fires the 9×19mm Parabellum round, from 30 round box magazines.

== Adoption ==
The firearm was only tested and produced under trials for the considered replacement of the aging M3 submachine gun that was supplied by the United States Military during the formation of the National Police Reserve after the war.

== See also ==
- Carl Gustav m/45
- Smith & Wesson M76
- TEC-9
