= 3rd Armored Cavalry Squadron (South Vietnam) =

- Active: 1954 - 1975
- Country: South Vietnam
- Branch: Armored Cavalry
- Part of: II Corps
- Garrison/HQ: Pleiku
- Engagements: Vietnam War: Tet Offensive; Easter Offensive
- Decorations: Presidential Unit Citation (United States)

The 3rd Armored Cavalry Squadron (Vietnamese: Thiết Đoàn 3 Thiết giáp) a battalion-sized unit of the Army of the Republic of Vietnam (ARVN), the South Vietnamese army. It was part of II Corps that oversaw the twelve provinces of the central highlands; corps headquarters being in the mountain town of Pleiku. The 3rd Armored Cav was organized on January 1, 1954.

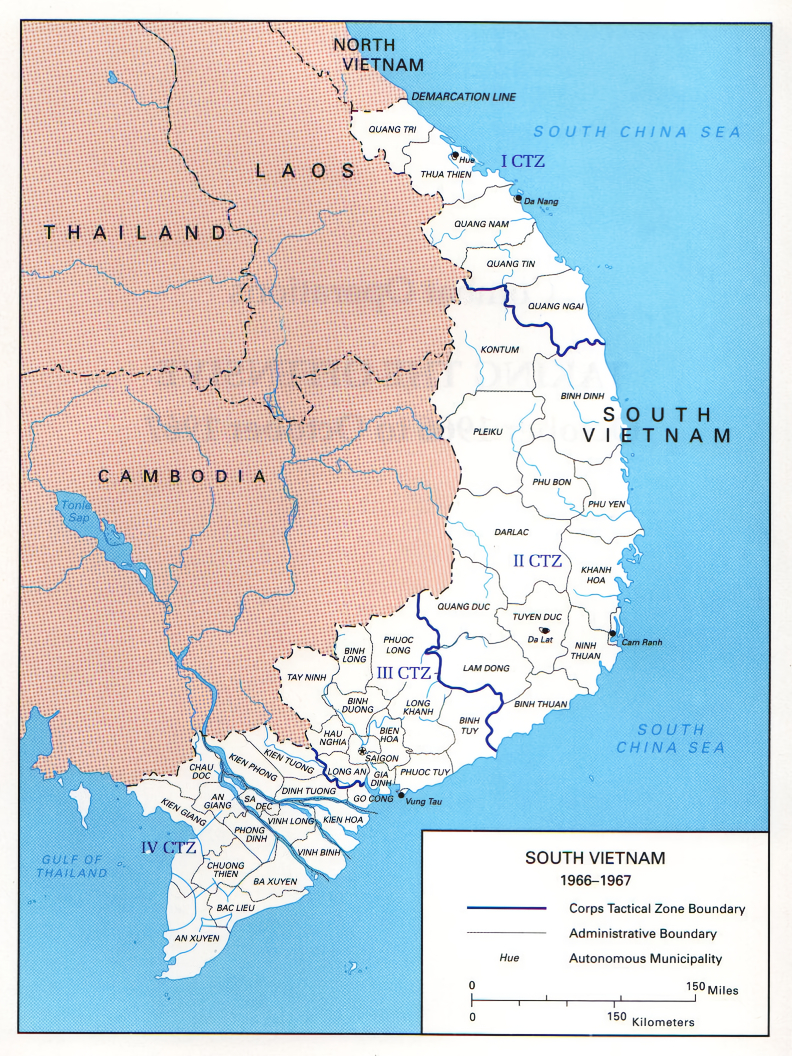
Map depicting the military regions of South Vietnam including II Corps where the 3rd Armored Cav served.

In 1971, the Presidential Unit Citation of the United States was awarded to the 3rd Armored Cavalry Squadron and attached U.S. Advisor/Liaison Personnel (MACV) for extraordinary heroism in action against an armed enemy during the period January 1, 1968, to September 30, 1968, in Pleiku and Binh Dinh Provinces. This makes the squadron one of only a few non-U.S. military units to receive the highest U.S. military honor awarded at the unit level.

== Presidential Unit Citation ==
DA General Order No. 24, 27 April 1971

THE PRESIDENTIAL UNIT CITATION (ARMY)
FOR EXTRAORDINARY HEROISM
TO THE 3D ARMORED CAVALRY SQUADRON
ARMY OF THE REPUBLIC OF VIETNAM
CONSISTING OF SQUADRON HEADQUARTERS
AND SERVICE TROOP AND
1ST, 3D AND 4TH TROOPS
AND U.S. ADVISOR/LIAISON PERSONNEL

The 3rd Armored Cavalry Squadron distinguished itself in military operations against hostile ground forces during the period 1 January 1968 to 30 September 1968. The Squadron engaged a Viet Cong battalion near the city of Pleiku during the Tet Offensive. Utilizing an array of weapons, the enemy fought in an attempt to occupy the city of Pleiku. The Squadron annihilated the enemy force. This lifted the siege of the city of Pleiku, and the 3rd Armored Cavalry Squadron was able to resume its normal mission of securing the U.S. 4th Division logistical lifeline between Pleiku and Kontum. The enemy then committed large forces in an effort to close a single existing supply route. The 3rd Armored Cavalry Squadron engaged a determined enemy to relieve the pressure of being isolated. In each encounter, the South Vietnamese cavalrymen exhibited tactics under painful circumstances and inflicted costly casualties on a larger force. Elements of the Squadron spearheaded direct strikes against the 18th North Vietnamese Army regiment in other major engagements in Binh Dinh Province and the city of Phu My. The resulting enemy casualties together with the destruction of residual weapon supplies forced the North Vietnamese to flee the battle. Through their courage, tactics, and determination the officers and men of the 3rd Armored Cavalry Squadron achieved victory. Their heroism under hazardous conditions reflect credit on them and the Army of the Republic of Vietnam.

== Specific Actions ==
February 1, 1968 (during the Tet Offensive)
The ARVN 3rd Cavalry Squadron fought a pitched battle with the Liberation Front's H-15 Local Force Battalion in or near Pleiku.

August 1968
Elements of the 3rd ARVN Cavalry, along with a reaction platoon from the 2/1st Cav, OPCONed to the 4th Inf, foiled an attempted NVA ambush, killing 31 enemy. The following day the soldiers found 10 more bodies bringing the toll to 41 enemy killed. In the third day of enemy harassment of convoys along Highway 14 in Kontum Province, an estimated force of two NVA companies attacked a 4th Div convoy 14 miles south of Kontum with mortar, recoilless rifle, small arms, and rocket and machinegun fire. Armored cars from the 4th MP Company immediately returned the fire. At the outbreak of the attack, tanks and armored cavalry assault vehicles of the 3rd ARVN Cavalry and the 2/1st Cav, which had been deployed along the highway in anticipation of possible contact, began to pour heavy fire into the enemy positions. Under the onslaught of allied armor the enemy broke contact, leaving 41 killed behind.

Easter Offensive 1972 - Battle of Kontum
On the 21st of May, a task force composed of the 2nd and '6th Ranger Groups and the 3rd Armored Cavalry began an operation to clear Highway 14. Convoys were needed to carry supplies from Pleiku to the forces defending Kontum City. Several B-52 and tactical air strikes of CBU-55s were placed on the PAVN 95B Regiment which was entrenched in the Chu Pao mountain pass. Initially the attack was successful, but as ARVN forces came with in B-40 range the fighting became more intense. When several armored personnel carriers and M-41 tanks were destroyed by the B-40s, the armor spearhead halted against the entrenched forces.

== See also ==
- Non-U.S. recipients of U.S. gallantry awards
- 1968 in the Vietnam War
- M113 armored personnel carrier
