= Brass catcher =

Device to catch ejected bullet casings

A brass catcher (also brass trap) is a device designed to capture cartridge casings, often made of brass, as they are ejected from a firearm. Various designs exist, utilizing a bag, pouch, net, or box to catch the casings. Some brass catchers, whether universal or designed for a specific gun, can be attached directly to the firearm. Other larger, free-standing brass catchers may be placed to the side of the firearm.

== Gallery ==
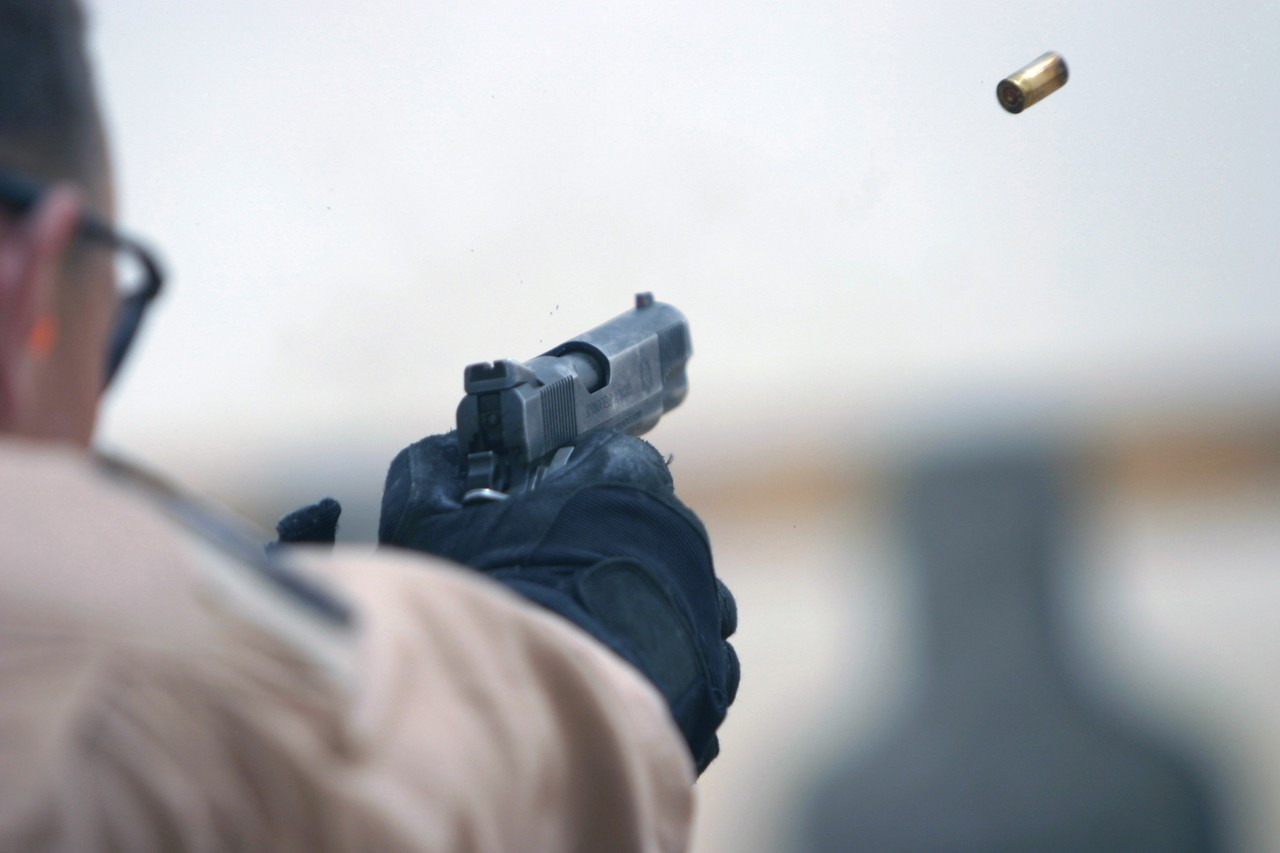
Casing after it is ejected from the firearm

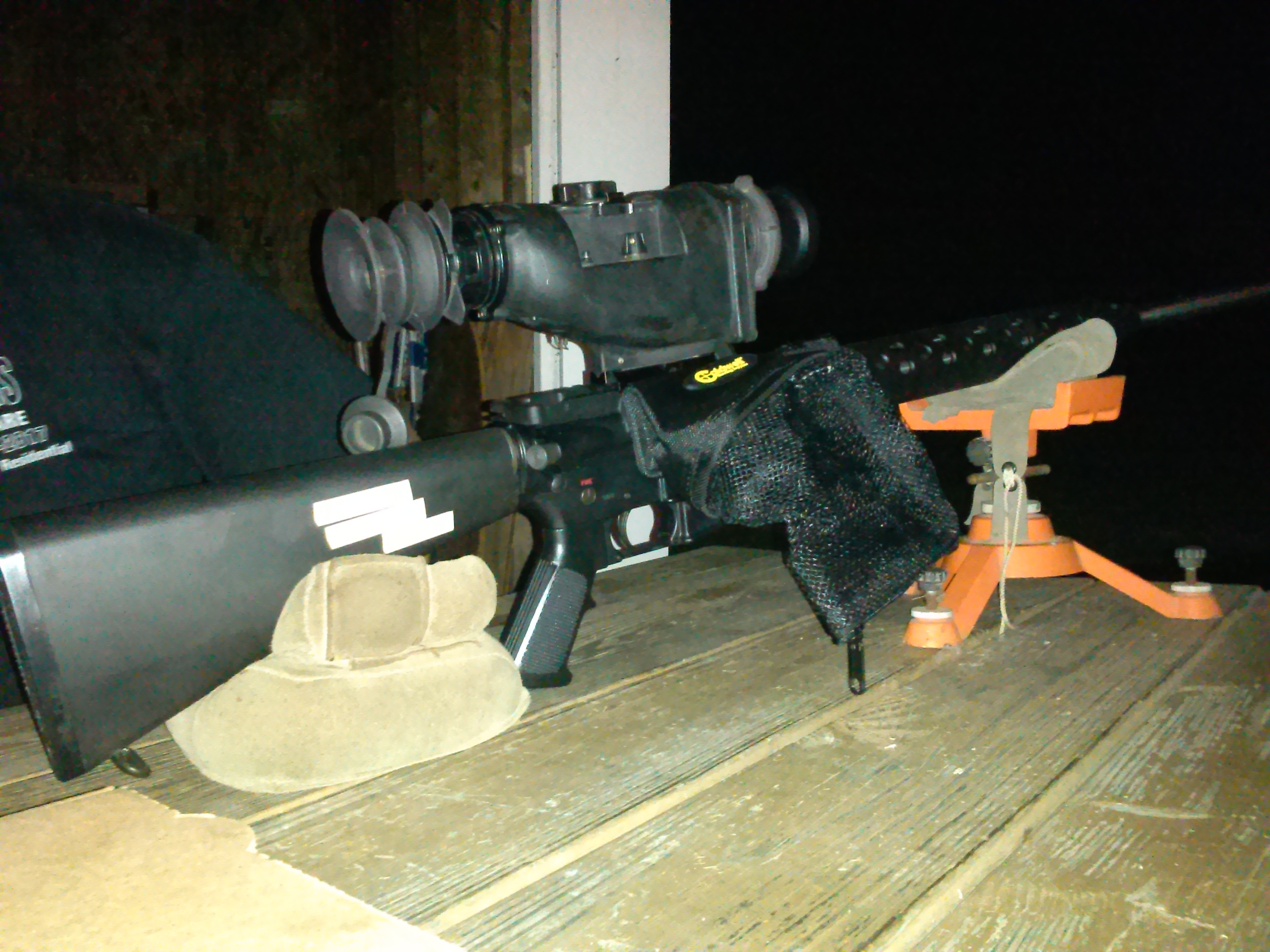
AR-15 with aftermarket brass catcher

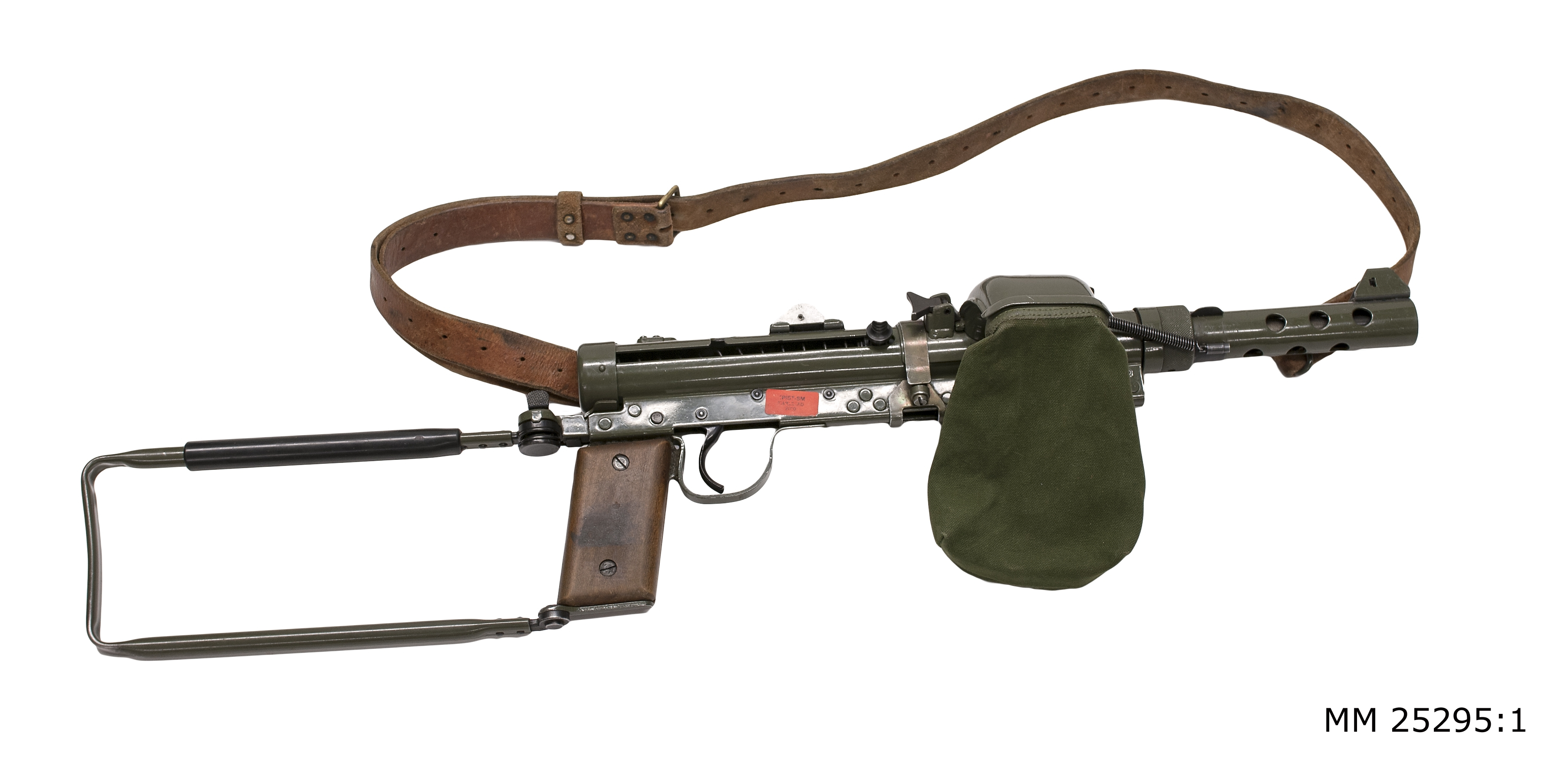
Carl Gustaf m/45B submachine gun with a brass catcher

Japanese Self-defense Force personnel holding his Howa Type 20 Assault Rifle with brass catcher attached

South Korean Marines firing his K2C1 rifle with brass catcher attached
