= Carl Gustaf m/45 =

Kulsprutepistol m/45 (Kpist m/45)
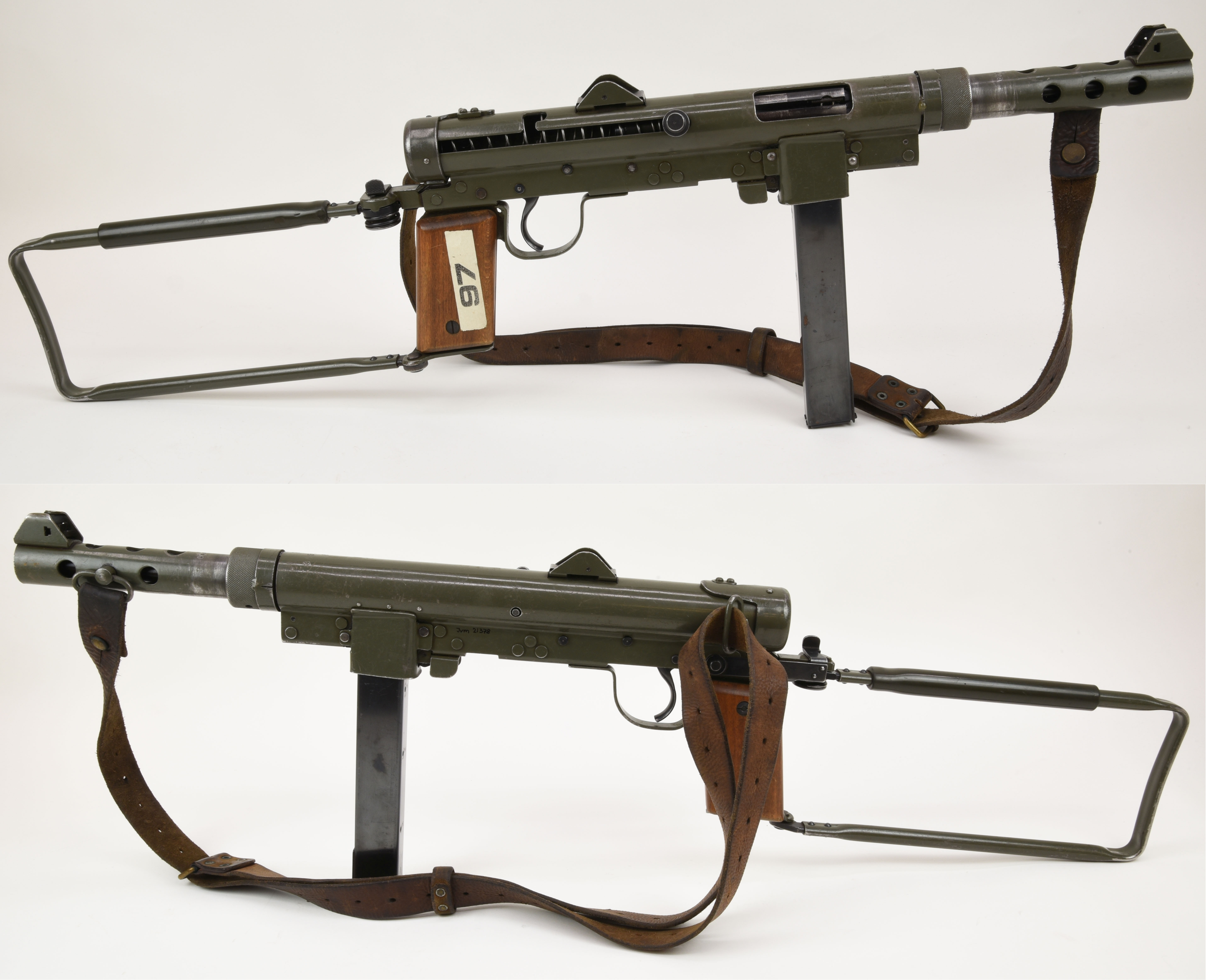
- Carl Gustaf m/45B
- Type: Submachine gun
- Place of origin: Sweden

Service history
- In service: 1945–present
- Used by: See Users
- Wars: Suez Crisis; Vietnam War; Laotian Civil War; Congo Crisis; Salvadoran Civil War; Lebanese Civil War; Israeli-Arab conflict; Soviet–Afghan War; First Congo War; Iraq War; Mali War; Russian invasion of Ukraine

Production history
- Designer: Gunnar Johansson
- Designed: 1944
- Manufacturer: Carl Gustafs Stads Gevärsfaktori; Maadi Factories, Egypt
- Produced: 1945–1964 (Sweden); 1965–1970 (Egypt)
- No. built: approx. 300,000
- Variants: m/45, m/45B, m/45C, m/45BE, m/45BET, m/45S, Port Said, Akaba, US Navy modification (no official designation) with suppressor.

Specifications
- Mass: 7.38 lbs (3.35 kg) without magazine
- Length: 21.65/31.81 in (550/808 mm)
- Barrel length: 8.34 in (212 mm)
- Cartridge: 9×19mm Parabellum (Known as 9×19mm m/39B in Sweden)
- Action: Blowback, open bolt
- Rate of fire: 600 rounds/min 900 rounds/min with A-SATS M/45(Accelerations-Sats M/45) short-stroking device installed
- Muzzle velocity: 1395 ft/s (425 m/s)
- Effective firing range: ~273 yards (250 m)
- Feed system: 36-round box magazine

The Kulsprutepistol m/45 (Kpist m/45), also known as the Carl Gustaf M/45 and the Swedish K SMG, is a 9×19mm Swedish submachine gun (SMG) designed by Gunnar Johansson, adopted in 1945 (hence the m/45 designation), and manufactured at the Carl Gustafs Stads Gevärsfaktori in Eskilstuna, Sweden. The m/45 was the standard submachine gun of the Swedish Army from 1945 to 1965. It was gradually replaced in Swedish service by updated Automatkarbin 4 battle rifles and Automatkarbin 5 assault rifles. The last official user of the m/45, the Swedish Home Guard (Hemvärnet), retired it from service in April 2007.

The m/45 SMG was developed in 1944–45, with a design borrowing from and also improving on many design elements of earlier submachine guns. The sheet metal stamping techniques used in making the German MP 40, the British Sten, and the Soviet PPSh-41 and PPS-43 were studied in detail. Two designs were tested in 1944, one from Carl Gustafs Stads Gevärsfaktori and one from Husqvarna Vapenfabriks and the prototype from Carl Gustafs Stads Gevärsfaktori was chosen for further development. The first production version was adopted in 1945 as the Kpist m/45. The Danish Hovea M/49 SMG, although similar in appearance, is not a version derived from the m/45. The Hovea was a development of the failed test contender (fm44) from Husqvarna.

== Features ==
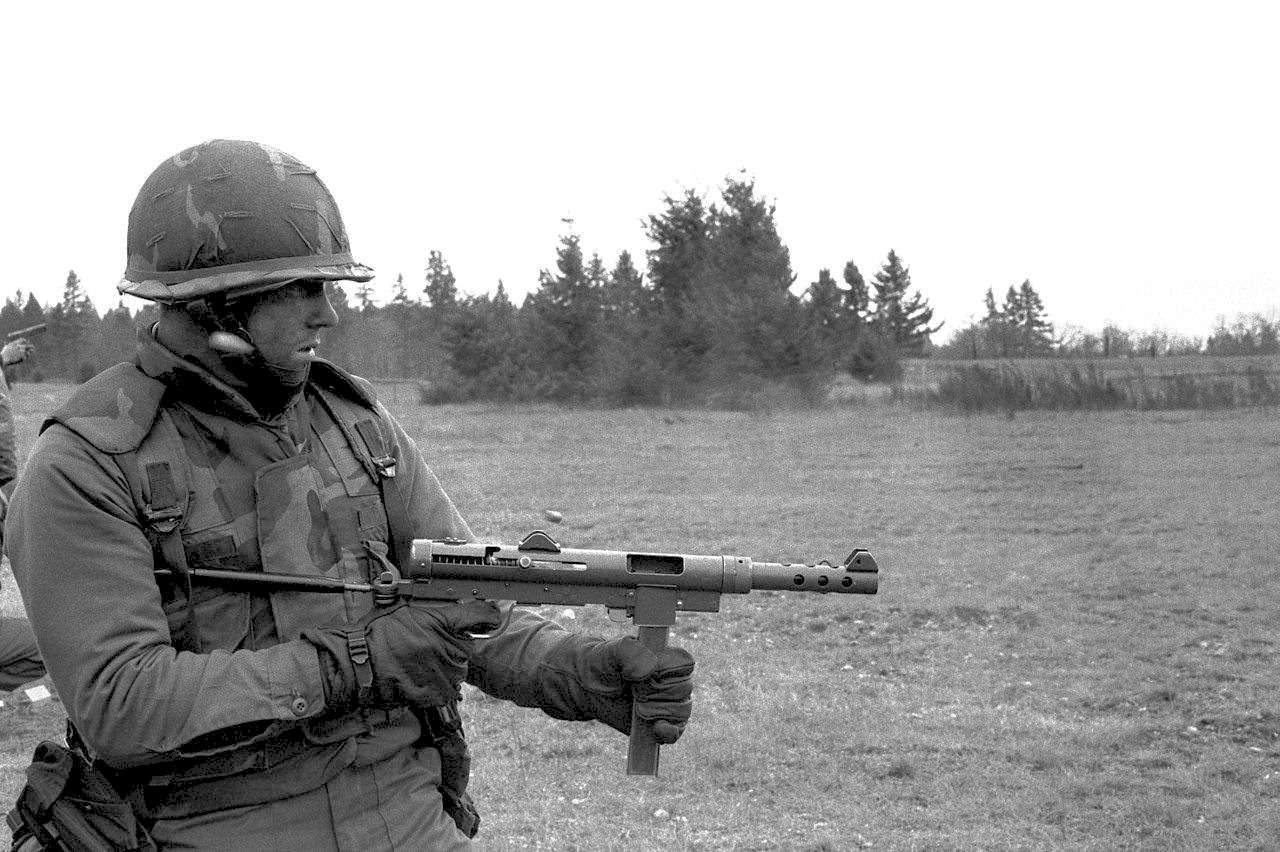
U.S. Army soldier firing an m/45B SMG during special weapons training. The soldier is incorrectly holding the weapon by its magazine, which may cause the magazine to come loose as well as damage the magazine housing. The correct grip requires the user to place their supporting hand just in front of the magazine.

The standard m/45 is a fully-automatic-only weapon without any option for semi-automatic fire. It weighs 3.3 kg (7.3 lb) unloaded, and 4.2 kg (9.3 lb) loaded with a 36-round box magazine. It is 808 mm (31.8 in) long with the stock extended, and 550 mm (22 in) long with the stock folded. The m/45 is an open bolt design with a fixed firing pin. The relatively slow cyclic rate of fire (550–600 rds/min) and low recoil of the bolt-mechanism actuation (straight blowback) makes it easy to control during full automatic fire. Single shots are also easy to achieve (with very little training) by letting go of the trigger before another round is cycled. The m/45 is fairly accurate up to 200 meters.

Accessories include a special sub-calibre barrel (painted silver) for firing blanks and low-powered gallery ammunition. When firing blanks, a cone shaped blank firing adapter must be attached to the threaded muzzle of the sub-calibre barrel (and secured by a clip) to ensure the mechanism has adequate pressure for its blowback operation. Other accessories include night sights (wartime use only) that attach to the fixed day sights (f: protected post, r: L-type), a brass catcher for collecting spent cartridges (peacetime use only, for reloading and recycling), a quick-detachable (by attached cord) ejection port cover (painted bright red) for guard duty which secures the bolt from accidental firing, and a magazine loader that loads a magazine from a cartridge tray in seconds. The m/45 was also issued with a standard cleaning kit containing a threaded cleaning rod, threaded jag and a container for the jag, lubricant and cleaning patches. The standard sling issued was made of leather, attached to the rear left receiver and left barrel-sleeve sling bars.

The 36-round straight detachable staggered row box magazine is wider at the rear than at the front, the extra space allows the tapered 9mm Parabellum cartridges to feed more efficiently. The trapezium design makes the magazine very reliable in dusty environments and sub-zero temperatures, because magazines of parallel-side design are more likely to jam under adverse conditions. The magazine was used post-war by Finland in the m/31 Suomi under the designation m/54, a distinguishing feature of the variation m/55 (made by Lapua) is a steel wire carrying loop mounted at the bottom front edge. The basic design idea of the m/45 magazine was also used for the magazines of the Czech model 23 and model 25 and the French MAS submachine guns.

The m/45 has no safety switch. Instead the m/45 is put in "safe" by sliding the cocking handle into a short side-slot above the main (lock) slot. In the example US Army photograph, this short safety side-slot is visible behind the rear L-sight. When the m/45 is unloaded the bolt is locked in place in the bolt-forward position by pushing the cocking handle inwards, engaging a hole in the lower left receiver wall.

== Variants ==
- First production: The SMG models Kpist m/45 and Kpist m/45S (integrated suppressor, never used in Sweden) feature a detachable (via removable clip) magazine support. It accepts the kpist m/37-39 50-round "coffin" magazine and the later standard 36-round box magazine. The m/45 has a dark gun metal finish.
- General production: The m/45B model features a fixed magazine support, smaller holes in the barrel shroud, a strengthened bolt buffer (in the receiver-rear), and a hook securing the buffer cap in place. Early m/45B models have the same metal finish as the m/45 but most have a dull green lacquer finish. Over time, most first production m/45s were converted by permanently riveting the magazine support to the receiver.
- UN/ONU and ceremonial: The m/45C is an m/45B with a bayonet mount on the barrel sleeve which was used for parade and guard duties. During the Congo Crisis in the 1960s, the Swedish UN forces used the C version extensively. The standard m/45 and m/45B have no bayonet mount.
- Police: The Swedish Police used the m/45 as a reinforcement weapon, issued to specially trained police officers under exceptional circumstances like terrorist attacks and armed robberies. Unlike the military model it was equipped with a selector switch for full auto or semi-auto fire. The police model designation was m/45BE (E = enkelskott (single-shot)) and BET (T = tårgas (tear gas)). The BET model was later locked to semi-auto with a screw to the selector switch. The police model has an all black finish, in contrast to the slate grey phosphate and enamel green of the military versions. In the mid to late 1970s the BE version was retrofitted with a modified stock (m/75) with a removable upper cheekpiece allowing the operator to wear a visored riot protection helmet (Huvudskydd m/69). The BET model was only used to fire a tear gas canister (Tårgaskastspray m/74). To be able to fire the canister, a special blank cartridge (9mm lös ptr m/T) had to be used. A red sticker on the left side of the weapon reminded the operator that only blank ammunition could be used. The BET also had a high front sight and an adjustable rear sight (30, 45 and 60 meters). The m/45 BET was replaced by Heckler & Koch MZP-1 (HP 40) in the early/mid 1990s because it was regarded unfashionable and also because new tear gas canisters became hard to obtain since they contained the hazardous substance: Freon-12.

== Manufacture and use ==
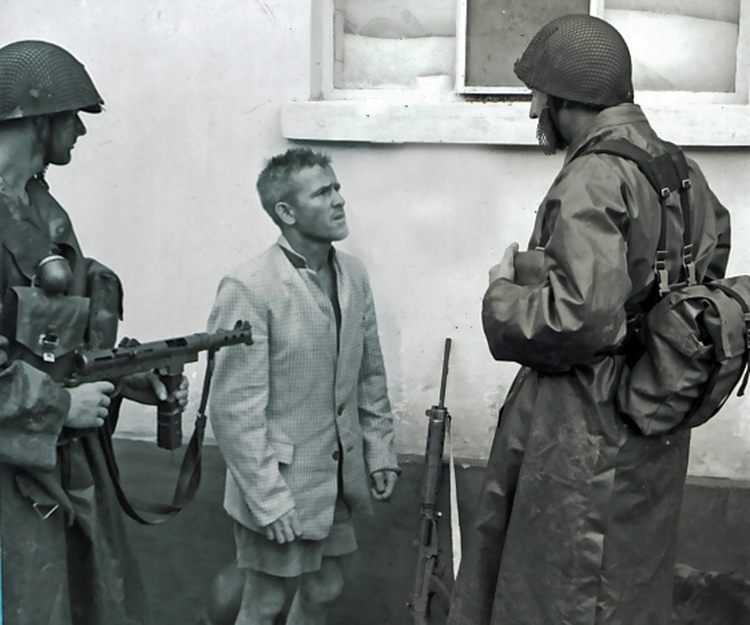
The Kpist m/45 in service (left) with Swedish soldiers during the Congo Crisis.

The Swedish Army list price of the Carl Gustaf m/45 in the late 1970s was around 600 Swedish kronor.

The Carl Gustaf m/45 was replaced as main infantry weapon in the Swedish Armed Forces during the mid-1960s with the Automatkarbin 4 battle rifle in 7.62×51mm NATO, but remained in use for auxiliary troops like artillery gun crews, supply- and engineering troops and the like until starting in 1986 being replaced with the 5.56mm Ak 5 assault rifle. On 2 April 2007 the kpist m/45 was officially declared obsolete when it was retired from the Home Guard who were the last users in the Swedish Armed Forces.

In addition to Sweden, several other countries have used the weapon, with versions of the weapon being produced in Egypt and the United States.

=== Licensed production in Egypt ===
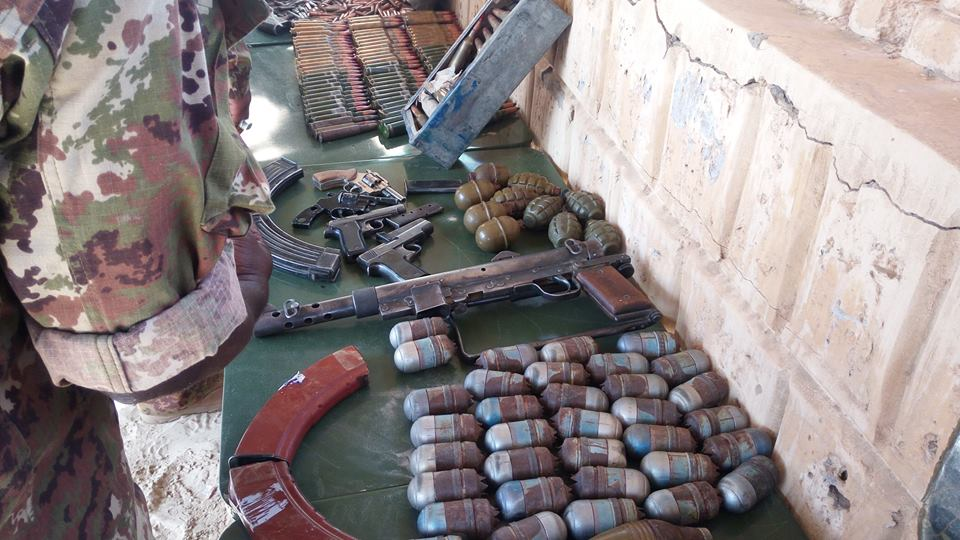
A Carl Gustaf m/45, probably a Port Said variant, seized in 2016 during the Northern Mali conflict.

The m/45 has been manufactured under license in Egypt as the Port Said and the Akaba. The tooling needed for production, as well as technical assistance, was sold by Sweden to Egypt during the 1950s. The Port Said looks and functions exactly as the m/45 (first version while the Akaba is a modified and simplified version). The Akaba has no barrel jacket and a slightly shorter barrel and the folding butt stock has been replaced by a telescoping wire butt stock similar to the one used on the US M3A1. The simplified sights of the Akaba were moved to the front (unprotected post) and back (protected peep) of the receiver.

=== Use by the United States in Southeast Asia ===
During the Vietnam War, the US Navy SEALs used the m/45 extensively. One of the gun's qualities which appealed to the US Navy was that the m/45 can fire almost immediately out of the water (over the beach). It also saw use by CIA operatives and advisers. In US service it was largely known as the "Swedish-K" or "K-Rifle". The US Navy was so impressed by the m/45 that when Sweden embargoed the export of weapons to the United States in 1966, Smith & Wesson was given the task of producing a copy. This was designated the Smith & Wesson M76. However, by the time the M76 was ready for combat deployment, the US Navy interest had largely evaporated. Many of the m/45s used by US forces and agencies were devoid of markings, implying clandestine use ("sanitized").

=== Illegal production in South America ===
In 1975, the Revolutionary Coordinating Junta, a Cuban-backed far-left internationalist organization, established a clandestine military factory in Buenos Aires. Although it was easy to produce explosives, there was a severe lack of materials to make firearms. In order to revert this, a Bolivian engineer, nicknamed "Comrade N", aiming to design "a submachine gun with the characteristics of an Uzi, but easier to build and disassemble and using 9mm ammunition" came out with the JCR-1. It was presented by the Argentinian People's Revolutionary Army through its newspaper Estrella Roja as a lightweight and concealable weapon. Approximately 5,000 units were manufactured, though only a few hundred could be assembled until the Argentine Army dismantled the factory in late 1975.

== Users ==
- Algeria
- Central African Republic: ex-Zairan Port Saids
- Egypt: Manufactured locally under license as the Port Said and Akaba.
- Estonia: Estonian Defence League
- Indonesia: Manufactured locally under license.
- Iraq: Port Said variant used by Iraqi insurgents
- Ireland: The Irish Army used the Carl Gustaf until it was replaced by the Steyr AUG.
- Jordan: Port Said variant
- Paraguay
- Sweden
- United States
- South Vietnam: Civilian Irregular Defense Group program and ARVN
- Ukraine
- Zaire: used Port Said variant

== See also ==
- Madsen M-50
- New Nambu M66
- Smith & Wesson M76
