= M41 =

M41, M-41, or M.41 may refer to:

== Transportation ==
- M-41 (Michigan highway), a former state highway in Michigan
- M41 (Cape Town), a Metropolitan Route in Cape Town, South Africa
- M41 (Johannesburg), a Metropolitan Route in Johannesburg, South Africa
- M41 (Durban), a Metropolitan Route near Durban, South Africa
- M41 motorway, a motorway in England
- M41 highway, a major highway in Central Asia which crosses the Pamir Mountains
- BMW M41, a 1994 straight-4 diesel engine

== Military ==
- M41 Walker Bulldog, an American light tank
- M41 155 mm howitzer motor carriage, developed from M24 Chaffee
- M1941 Johnson rifle
- M1941 Johnson light machine gun
- Macchi M.41 and M.41bis, an Italian flying boat fighter of the 1930s
- Type 41 75 mm mountain gun, a Japanese artillery gun
- HMS Quorn (M41), a British naval minesweeper
- M41 light rifle/TLR-41, a possible designation for the Thompson light rifle
- M1941 field jacket, a World War II-era US Army uniform jacket

== Entertainment ==
- M41A pulse rifle, a fictional assault rifle from the 1986 film Aliens and related media
- The 41st millennium, as expressed in the game Warhammer 40000.

== Other ==
- Messier 41 (M41), an open star cluster in the constellation Canis Major
- M41, a postcode in the M postcode area that covers the town of Urmston, United Kingdom
- the 41st Mersenne prime
