= Kpist (band) =

Swedish electronic rock band

Kpist is a Swedish electronic rock band from Umeå noted for releasing music heavily influenced by video games and video game culture. Their name is short in Swedish for kulsprutepistol, which translates to submachine gun.

Several of their more popular tracks are tributes to gaming, while using gaming terminology to touch deeper matters. For example, their 2002 release Enemies of Silence featured a track named C64, a reference and tribute to the classic computer Commodore 64, which also talks about independence, freedom and control, with such lines as "I know it makes you sick that your movements are decided by a joystick."

Some songs were used in the 2002 movie Livet i 8 Bitar.

== Discography ==
- Voltage Controlled, 1997
- Enemies of Silence, 2002
- C64, 2002
