= Smith & Wesson Model 76 =

American submachine gun

Smith & Wesson M76
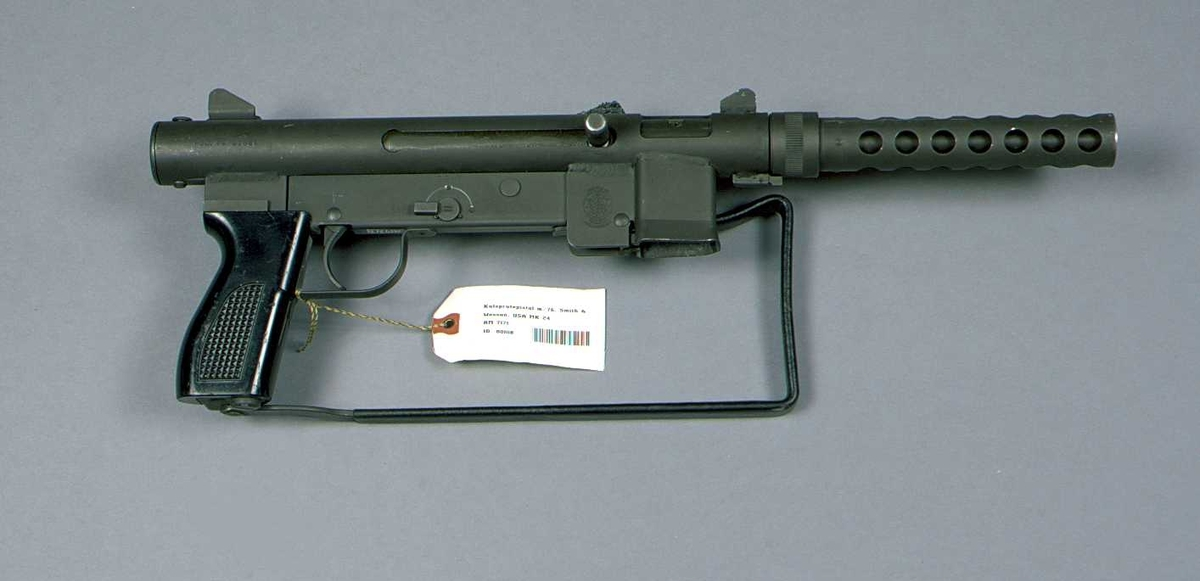
- S&W M76 Submachine Gun
- Type: Submachine gun
- Place of origin: United States

Service history
- Wars: Vietnam War

Production history
- Designed: 1967
- Manufacturer: Smith & Wesson
- Produced: 1967–1974
- Variants: See Variants

Specifications
- Mass: Unloaded: 7.25 lb (3.29 kg); Loaded: 8.75 lb (3.97 kg)
- Length: Stock folded: 22.5 in (570 mm); Stock extended: 30.50 in (775 mm)
- Barrel length: 8 in (200 mm)
- Cartridge: 9×19mm Parabellum
- Action: Blowback, open and closed bolt
- Rate of fire: 720 rounds/min
- Feed system: 14-, 24- or 36-round box magazine
- Sights: Front: protected blade, rear: fixed aperture

The Smith & Wesson M76 submachine gun (SMG) was produced by Smith & Wesson from 1967 to 1974.

== History ==
The history of the Model 76 submachine gun started in April 1966 with a call from Smith & Wesson's Washington, D.C. sales representative; he had been contacted by the US Navy Department to see if Smith & Wesson would be interested in designing, and producing a 9mm submachine gun.

The US Navy had the need for a submachine gun for their SEAL special operations team in Vietnam. The SEALs' weapon of choice was the Swedish Carl Gustaf m/45―a well-made and reliable submachine gun.

Because Sweden was a neutral country, a problem arose; they objected to their product being used in a war zone. Therefore, the supply of the Carl Gustaf m/45 to the US Navy was cut off, which meant they had to find another submachine gun to take its place.

Although they appear similar, the M76 was designed from scratch from a list of requirements, which the US Navy SEALs provided, they are:

- Urgent need
- Reliability
- Rugged
- Selective fire: safe—semi-automatic—full automatic
- Cost effective
- Ease of maintenance: disassembly—cleaning―reassembly
- Magazine capacity of 36 rounds
- Cyclic rate between 600 and 800 rounds per minute preferred

It was from this list that the M76 was created. According to the Director of Research and Development and head of the Model 76 project at the time, Dwayne W. Charron, was quoted as saying, "[He] had never seen, held or fired a Swedish K before starting design work on the M76...". The M76 fires 9mm rounds; the Carl Gustaf m/45 has an open bolt design and also fires 9×19mm Parabellum ammunition.

The SEALs also requested a limited number of suppressors for the M76. These suppressors were to be used under certain situations to reduce the gun's sound, and hide the flash so there would be no point of reference for return fire. Being an open bolt system, some sound would always be emitted, but the muzzle flash could be eliminated.

Due to the ongoing war, and a critical need to fill, Smith & Wesson designated the M76 a top priority project. The total time to take the concept of the M76 from the drawing board to production was just nine months. Many people comment that the gun is ugly or rough. Due to the urgency at the time, the M76 skipped the finishing department where welds and rough edges would normally be smoothed.

Due to lack of market demand, Smith & Wesson ceased production of the M76 in 1974. Despite the gun's lack of market demand, it gained some measure of popularity in action movies of the 1970s and 1980s, including Prime Cut, The Omega Man, The Taking of Pelham One Two Three, and more recently in The Dark Knight and Street Kings.

== Variants ==
=== MK760 ===
In 1983, Mike Ruplinger and Kenneth Dominick started a company called MK Arms and acquired the rights to the Smith & Wesson M76. They began producing copies of it with the designation MK Arms MK760, and the US Navy, which still had some original M76s in its inventory, began purchasing replacement parts from MK Arms. MK Arms also produced carbine, and pistol configurations of the MK760. In 1986, due to the Hughes Amendment to the Firearm Owners Protection Act, which banned any newly manufactured automatic weapons from being registered for civilian ownership, MK Arms went out of business.

=== M76A1 ===
In 1984, Dominick separated from Ruplinger and began producing his own copy of the M76 under the trade name Global Arms with a designation of M76A1.

=== SW 76 ===
The SW 76 was manufactured by JMB Distribution in Ohio from virgin tubes that were originally registered by John Stemple in 1986. All of the parts of the SW 76 will interchange with an original Smith & Wesson M76 except for the bolt. The bolt is not interchangeable due to the reorientation of the extractor and the Stemple receiver tubes have an inside diameter that is slightly larger than that of an original S&W M76, requiring two sleeves that act as bearing surfaces to be placed on the bolt to take up the extra space inside the receiver.

=== Omega 760 Carbine ===
During 2001 the Tactical Weapons Company of Arizona was engaged to manufacture the parts and receivers for a weapon that would be marketed as the Omega 760 carbine, a semiautomatic-only copy of the Smith & Wesson Model 76 that accepted Sten gun magazines. Initial sales of the Omega 760 were brisk but quickly dropped off. The disappointing sales of the Omega ultimately drove the decision to cease production and the decision left a number of parts that were never assembled into guns.

== Users ==
- Saudi Arabia: Only export sale of the M76. Replaced by the MP5 when the M76 was discontinued.
- United States of America
  - United States Navy, Mark 24 Mod 0
  - New York Police Department NYPD stakeout squad NYPD Emergency Services Unit

=== Non-State Actors ===
- Viet Cong − Some used, likely taken from American soldiers.
